= List of Eumolpinae genera =

This is a list of genera in the leaf beetle subfamily Eumolpinae:

== A ==
- Abiromorphus Pic, 1924
- Abirus Chapuis, 1874
- Acanthixus Lefèvre, 1876
- †Acolaspoides Moseyko, Kirejtshuk & Nel, 2010
- Acronymolpus Samuelson, 2015
- Acrothinium Marshall, 1865
- Adorea Lefèvre, 1877
- Aemnestus Jacoby, 1908
- Afroeurydemus Selman, 1965
- Agbalus Chapuis, 1874
- Agetinella Jacoby, 1908 (Note: According to a 1990 PhD thesis by Chris A.M. Reid, this genus actually belongs to the subfamily Cryptocephalinae and is a synonym of Leasia Jacoby, 1907.)
- Agetinus Lefèvre, 1885
- Agrianes Chapuis, 1874
- Agrosterna Harold, 1875
- Ajubus Aslam, 1968
- Aksakidion Flowers, 2023
- Alethaxius Lefèvre, 1885
- Alittus Chapuis, 1874
- Allocolaspis Bechyné, 1950
- Aloria Anonymous, 1940 (= Enneaoria Tan, 1981)
- Alwiunia Bechyné, 1953
- Amblynetes Weise, 1904
- Ambodiriana Bechyné, 1953
- Ambohitsitondrona Bechyné, 1964
- Anachalcoplacis B. Bechyné, 1983
- Anchieta Bechyné, 1954
- Andosia Weise, 1896
- Andrahomana Bechyné, 1956
- Androyinus Bechyné, 1964
- Anidania Reitter, 1889
- Antitypona Weise, 1921
- Aoria Baly, 1863 (= Osnaparis Fairmaire, 1889 = Pseudaoria Jacoby, 1908)
- †Aoriopsis Moseyko, Kirejtshuk & Nel, 2010
- Aphilenia Weise in Reitter, 1889
- Apolepis Baly, 1863
- Apterodina Bechyné, 1954
- Argoa Lefèvre, 1885
- Aristonoda Bechyné, 1953
- Arnobiopsis Jacoby, 1896
- Arsoa Fairmaire, 1901
- Atomyria Jacobson, 1894
- Atrichatus Sharp, 1886
- Aulacia Baly, 1867
- Aulacioides Romantsov, 2024
- Aulacolepis Baly, 1863
- Aulexis Baly, 1863
- Auranius Jacoby, 1881
- Australotymnes Flowers, 2009

== B ==
- Badenis Weise, 1909
- Balya Jacoby, 1882
- Basilepta Baly, 1860
- Bastrhembus Bechyné, 1947
- Bathseba Motschulsky, 1866 (= Tricliona Lefèvre, 1885)
- Bedelia Lefèvre, 1875
- Beltia Jacoby, 1881
- Berliozita Bechyné, 1957
- Brachymolpus Fairmaire, 1903
- Brachypnoea Gistel, 1848
- Brachypterodina Flowers, 2004
- Brevicolaspis Laporte, 1833
- Bromius Chevrolat in Dejean, 1836

== C ==
- Callicolaspis Bechyné, 1950
- Callipta Lefèvre, 1885
- Callisina Baly, 1860
- Caryonoda Bechyné, 1951
- Casmena Chapuis, 1874
- Caspiana Lopatin, 1978
- Caudatomolpus Bechyné, 1953
- Cayetunya Bechyné, 1958
- Cazeresia Jolivet, Verma & Mille, 2005
- Cellomius Lefèvre, 1888
- Chalcolema Jacoby, 1890
- Chalcophana Chevrolat in Dejean, 1836
- Chalcophyma Baly, 1865
- Chalcoplacis Chevrolat in Dejean, 1836
- Chalcosicya Blake, 1930
- Cheiridea Baly, 1878
- Cheiridella Jacoby, 1904
- Chiridisia Jacoby, 1898
- Chloropterus Morawitz, 1861
- Chrysochares Morawitz, 1861
- Chrysochus Chevrolat in Dejean, 1836
- Chrysodinopsis Bechyné, 1950
- Chrysolampra Baly, 1859
- Chrysonopa Jacoby, 1908
- Chrysopida Baly, 1861
- Cleoparida Gressitt, 1967
- Cleoporus Lefèvre, 1884
- Cleorina Lefèvre, 1885
- Cleptor Lefèvre, 1885
- Clisithera Baly, 1864
- Clypeolaria Lefèvre, 1885
- Cocotteumolpus Bechyné, 1957
- Colasita Bechyné, 1964
- Colaspedusa Medvedev, 1998
- Colaspibasa Medvedev, 1995
- Colaspidea Laporte, 1833
- Colaspina Weise, 1893
- Colaspinella Weise, 1893
- Colaspis Fabricius, 1801
- Colaspoides Laporte, 1833
- Colasposoma Laporte, 1833
- Coniomma Weise, 1922
- Corumbaea Bechyné, 1954
- Corysthea Baly, 1865
- Costalimaita Bechyné, 1954
- Coytiera Lefèvre, 1875
- Crowsonia Monrós, 1952
- Cryocolaspis Flowers, 2004
- Cubispa Barber, 1946
- Cudnellia Blackburn, 1889
- Cylindromela Weise, 1916
- Cyno Marshall, 1865

== D ==
- Daccordimolpus Zoia, 2025
- Damasus Chapuis, 1874
- Damelia Clark, 1864
- Dematochroma Baly, 1864
- Dematotrichus Gómez-Zurita, 2022
- Demotina Baly, 1863
- Deretrichia Weise, 1913
- Dermestops Jacobson, 1898
- Dermorhytis Baly, 1861
- Dermoxanthus Baly, 1859
- Deuteragbalus Bechyné, 1949
- Deuteronoda Bechyné, 1951
- Deuterotrichia Bechyné, 1957
- Diacolaspis Bechyné, 1950
- Dicolectes Lefèvre, 1886
- Diconerissus Burgeon, 1941
- Dictyneis Baly, 1865
- Didalsus Fairmaire, 1887
- Diplasiaca Weise, 1923
- Dispardentium Sublett & Cook, 2021
- Dolichenus Lefèvre, 1885
- Dorysternoides Bechyné & Bechyné, 1967
- Drakhshandus Aslam, 1968
- Dryadomolpus Bechyné & Bechyné, 1969
- Dumbea Jolivet, Verma & Mille, 2007
- Durangoita Bechyné, 1958

== E ==
- Eboo Reid, 1993
- Echtrusia Lefèvre, 1890
- Edistus Lefèvre, 1884
- Edusella Chapuis, 1874
- Edusoides Blackburn, 1889
- Eka Maulik, 1931
- Endocephalus Chevrolat in Dejean, 1836
- Endoschyrus Jacoby, 1901
- Endroedymolpus Zoia, 2001
- Ennodius Lefèvre, 1885
- Entomochirus Lefèvre, 1884
- Entreriosa Bechyné, 1953
- †Eocenocolaspis Bukejs, Moseyko & Alekseev, 2022
- †Eoeumolpinus Haupt, 1950
- Ephyraea Lefèvre, 1889
- Epinodostoma Bryant & Gressitt, 1957
- Epiphyma Baly, 1860
- Epistamena Weise, 1915
- Eprius Fairmaire, 1902
- Erotenia Lefèvre, 1884
- Erythraella Zoia, 2012
- Eryxia Baly, 1865
- Eucampylochira Bechyné, 1951
- Eucolaspinus Lea, 1916
- Eucolaspis Sharp, 1886
- Eulepton Riley, 2019
- Eulychius Jacoby, 1882
- †Eumolpites Heer, 1865
- Eumolpopsis Jacoby, 1894
- Eumolpus Weber, 1801
- Eupetale Flowers, 2021
- Euphrytus Jacoby, 1881
- Eurydemus Chapuis, 1874
- Euryope Dalman, 1824 (= Bechyneia Jolivet, 1950)
- Eurypelta Lefèvre, 1885
- Eurysarcus Lefèvre, 1885
- Eurysthenes Lefèvre, 1885
- Exochognathus Blake, 1946

== F ==
- Ferreirana Bechyné, 1958
- Fidia Motschulsky, 1861 (= Lypesthes Baly, 1863)
- Floricola Gistel, 1848 (= Eupales Lefèvre, 1885)
- Fractipes Bechyné, 1950
- Frenais Jacoby, 1903
- Freudeita Bechyné, 1950
- Freycolaspis Scherer, 1964

== G ==
- Gaberella Selman, 1965
- Geloptera Baly, 1861
- Glyptoscelis Chevrolat in Dejean, 1836
- Glyptosceloides Askevold & Flowers, 1994
- Goniopleura Westwood, 1832
- Graphops LeConte, 1884
- Gressittana Medvedev, 2009
- Gressittella Medvedev, 2009
- Guyanica Chevrolat in Dejean, 1836

== H ==
- Habrophora Erichson, 1847
- Hemigymna Weise, 1923
- Heminodes Jacoby, 1895
- Hemiplatys Baly, 1863
- Hemydacne Jacoby, 1897
- Hemyloticus Jacoby, 1892
- Hermesia Lefèvre, 1877
- Hermesilla Bechyné, 1954
- Heteraspis Chevrolat in Dejean, 1836 (= Scelodonta Westwood, 1838)
- Heterotrichus Chapuis, 1874
- Hylax Lefèvre, 1884
- Hyperaxis Harold, 1874
- Hypoderes Lefèvre, 1877

== I ==
- Iphimeis Baly, 1864
- Iphimoides Jacoby, 1883
- Iphimolpus Bechyné, 1949
- Irenes Chapuis, 1874
- Ischyrolampra Lefèvre, 1885
- Ischyrolamprina Bechyné, 1950
- Isolepronota Bechyné, 1949
- Itatiaya Bechyné, 1953
- Iviva Gressitt, 1969
- Ivongionymus Bechyné, 1946
- Ivongius Harold, 1877

== J ==
- Jansonius Baly, 1878

== K ==
- Keeta Maulik, 1931
- Kimberleya Weise, 1916
- Kumatoeides Gómez-Zurita, 2018

== L ==
- Labasa Bryant, 1925
- Lahejia Gahan, 1896
- Lamprosphaerus Baly, 1859
- Lebisiella Bechyné, 1947
- Ledesmodina Bechyné, 1951
- Lefevrea Jacoby, 1897
- Lepidocolaspis Lea, 1915
- Lepina Baly, 1863 (= Demotinella Jacoby, 1908)
- Lepinaria Medvedev, 1998 (= Pseudolepis Medvedev & Zoia, 2001)
- Leprocolaspis Bechyné, 1951
- Lepronida Baly, 1864
- Lepronota Chapuis, 1874
- Leprotoides Jacoby, 1896
- Lindinia Lefèvre, 1893
- Llanomolpus Bechyné, 1997
- Lobispa Staines, 2001
- Longeumolpus Špringlová, 1960
- Lophea Baly, 1865
- Louisdesartsia Bechyné, 1955
- Lucignolo Zoia, 2010
- Lymidus Fairmaire, 1901
- Lyraletes Bechyné, 1952

== M ==
- Macetes Chapuis, 1874
- Macrocoma Chapuis, 1874
- Mahakirya Bechyné, 1949
- Mahatsinjoa Bechyné, 1964
- Majungaeus Bechyné, 1949
- Malayocorynus Medvedev, 2004
- Malegia Lefèvre, 1883
- Mandollia Selman, 1965
- Marajoarinha B. Bechyné, 1983
- Mariamela Monrós, 1951
- Massiea Lefèvre, 1893
- Mecistes Chapuis, 1874
- Medvedemolpus Moseyko, 2010
- Megalocolaspoides Medvedev, 2005
- Megascelis Latreille, 1825
- Megasceloides Jacoby, 1898
- Melindea Lefèvre, 1884
- Melinodea Jacoby, 1900
- Meniellus Weise, 1903
- Menioporus Duvivier, 1891
- Menius Chapuis, 1874
- Meroda Baly, 1860
- Mesocolaspis Jacoby, 1908
- Metachroma Chevrolat in Dejean, 1836
- Metacolaspis Horn, 1895
- Metaparia Crotch, 1873
- Metaxyonycha Chevrolat in Dejean, 1836
- Microaletes Bechyné, 1954
- Microeurydemus Pic, 1938
- Microhermesia Jacoby, 1900
- Micromolpus Gressitt, 1969
- Microsyagrus Pic, 1952
- Mireditha Reitter, 1913
- Monardiella Pic, 1940
- Monrosiella Bechyné, 1945
- Montrouzierella Jolivet, Verma & Mille, 2007
- Mouhotina Lefèvre, 1885
- Murimolpus Bechyné, 1950
- Myochrous Erichson, 1847

== N ==
- Nakanaia Gressitt, 1969
- Neculla Baly, 1863
- Neochalcoplacis Bechyné, 1950
- Neocles Chapuis, 1874
- Neocloides Jacoby, 1898
- Neofidia Strother, 2020 (= Fidia Baly, 1863)
- Neoiphimeis Bechyné, 1954
- Neovianaeta Bechyné, 1954
- Nephrella Baly, 1863
- Nerissella Jacoby, 1904
- Nerissus Chapuis, 1874
- Nodina Motschulsky, 1858
- Nodocolaspis Bechyné, 1949
- Nodonotopsis Bechyné, 1949
- Nodostella Jacoby, 1908
- Nodostonopa Jacoby, 1901
- Noriaia Bechyné, 1954
- Nossioecus Harold, 1877
- Notoxolepra Medvedev, 2004
- Nycterodina Bechyné, 1951

== O ==
- Obelistes Lefèvre, 1885
- Ocnida Lefèvre, 1885
- Odontiomorpha Jacoby, 1900
- Odontionopa Chevrolat in Dejean, 1836
- Olorus Chapuis, 1874
- Orthaulexis Gressitt, 1945
- Otilea Lefèvre, 1877

== P ==
- Pachnephoptrus Reitter, 1892
- Pachnephorus Chevrolat in Dejean, 1836
- Pagellia Lefèvre, 1885
- Pagriella Medvedev, 1993
- Pagria Lefèvre, 1884
- †Paleomolpus Nadein, 2015
- Pallena Chapuis, 1874
- Paracrothinium Chen, 1940
- Parademotina Bryant & Gressitt, 1957
- Paraivongius Pic, 1936
- Parascela Baly, 1878
- Parheminodes Chen, 1940
- Paria LeConte, 1858
- Parnops Jacobson, 1894
- Pathius Aslam, 1968
- Pausiris Chapuis, 1874
- Peniticus Sharp, 1876
- Percolaspis Bechyné, 1957
- Periparia Bechyné, 1951
- Phaedroides Lefèvre, 1885
- Phainodina Gressitt, 1969
- Phanaeta Lefèvre, 1878
- Phascus Lefèvre, 1884
- Pheloticus Harold, 1877
- Philippimolpus Monrós, 1952
- Phytoparia Bechyné, 1957
- Phytorellus Medvedev & Moseyko, 2003
- Phytorus Jacoby, 1884
- Pilacolaspis Sharp, 1886
- Piomera Baly, 1863
- Plastonothus Lefèvre, 1884
- Platycornia Zoia, 2018
- Platycorynus Chevrolat in Dejean, 1836
- Plaumannita Bechyné, 1954
- Podocolaspis Bechyné, 1953
- Podoxenus Lefèvre, 1877
- Prionodera Chevrolat in Dejean, 1836
- Prionoderita Flowers, 2004
- †Profidia Gressitt, 1963
- Proliniscus Selman, 1965
- Promecosoma Lefèvre, 1877
- Prypnocolaspis Lea, 1915
- Psathyrocerus Blanchard, 1851
- Pseudabirus Fairmaire, 1897
- Pseudedusia Jacoby, 1898
- Pseudivongius Jacoby, 1897
- Pseudochoris Jacoby, 1890
- Pseudocolaspis Laporte, 1833
- Pseudocolaspoides Medvedev, 2005
- Pseudolpus Jacoby, 1884
- Pseudometaxis Jacoby, 1900
- Pseudostola Fairmaire, 1899
- Pseudostonopa Jacoby, 1903
- Pseudosyagrus Fairmaire, 1886
- Pseudoxanthus Zoia, 2010
- Pubicolaspis Bechyné, 1954
- Pygocolaspis Bechyné, 1950
- Pygomolpus Bechyné, 1949
- Pyropida Baly, 1862

== R ==
- Rhabdocolaspis Bechyné, 1953
- Rhabdopterus Lefèvre, 1885
- Rhembastichus Weise, 1908
- Rhembastus Harold, 1877
- Rhembivongius Bechyné, 1964
- Rhinobolus Blackburn, 1889
- Rhodopaea Gruev & Tomov, 1968
- Rhynchomolpus Gressitt, 1969
- Rhyparida Baly, 1861
- Rhyparidella Gressitt, 1969
- Rhyparidula Weise, 1910
- Rosiroia Bechyné, 1950
- Ruffoita Bechyné, 1950

== S ==
- Sahantaha Bechyné, 1947
- Samuelsonia Jolivet, Verma & Mille, 2007
- Sandrananta Bechyné, 1964
- Sarum Selman, 1965
- Scelodontina Medvedev, 1979
- Scelolanka Medvedev, 1974
- Schizonoda Bechyné, 1950
- Scotosus Fairmaire, 1901
- Sedlacekia Gressitt, 1969
- Selmania Zoia, 2019 (= Massartia Selman, 1965)
- Semmiona Fairmaire, 1885
- Sibotes Lefèvre, 1885
- Sphaeropis Lefèvre, 1876
- Sphaerostola Fairmaire, 1903
- Spintherophyta Dejean, 1836
- Stasimus Baly, 1863
- Stereonoda Bechyné, 1951
- Sterneurus Lefèvre, 1875
- Sternocolaspis Bechyné, 1950
- Stethotes Baly, 1867
- Stizomolpus Gressitt, 1969
- Stygnobia Weise, 1922
- Stylomolpus Bechyné, 1953
- Susteraia Bechyné, 1950
- Syagrus Chapuis, 1874
- Sybriacosoma Jacoby, 1895
- Sybriacus Harold, 1877
- Syricta Baly, 1865

== T ==
- Taimbezinhia Bechyné, 1954
- Talurus Lefèvre, 1889
- Tanybria Selman, 1963
- Taophila Heller, 1916
- †Taphioporus Moseyko & Kirejtshuk, 2013
- Tectaletes Bechyné, 1953
- Terillus Chapuis, 1874
- Thasycles Chapuis, 1874
- Theocolaspis Bechyné, 1953
- Therses Jacoby, 1890
- Thootes Jacoby, 1890
- Thyra Lefèvre, 1875
- Thyrasia Jacoby, 1884
- Thysanomeros Flowers, 2003
- Thysbina Weise, 1902
- Tijucana Bechyné, 1957
- Timentes Selman, 1965
- Tomecolaspis Weise, 1923
- Tricliophora Jacoby, 1904
- Trichochalcea Baly, 1878
- Trichochrysea Baly, 1861
- Trichocolaspis Medvedev, 2005
- Tricholapita Gómez-Zurita & Cardoso, 2020
- Trichospinthera Bechyné & Bechyné, 1976
- Trichostola Chapuis, 1874
- Trichotheca Baly, 1860
- Trichoxantha Medvedev, 1992
- Trypocolaspis Lea, 1915
- Tymnes Chapuis, 1874
- Typophorus Chevrolat in Dejean, 1836
- Tyrannomolpus Nadein & Leschen, 2017

== U ==
- Uhehlia Weise, 1906

== V ==
- Vadoniella Bechyné, 1947
- Vianaeta Bechyné, 1949
- Vieteumolpus Medvedev, 2004
- Vinsoneumolpus Bechyné, 1957
- Vitibia Fairmaire, 1882

== W ==
- Weiselina Reitter, 1913
- Wittmerita Bechyné, 1950

== X ==
- Xanthonia Baly, 1863
- Xanthopachys Baly, 1864
- Xanthophorus Jacoby, 1908

== Z ==
- Zavadilia Bechyné, 1946
- Zenocolaspis Bechyné, 1997
- Zohrana Aslam, 1968

== Other ==
Genera formerly placed in Eumolpinae, but are now placed in other subfamilies:

- Platycolaspis Jacoby, 1908 (now in Cryptocephalinae)
