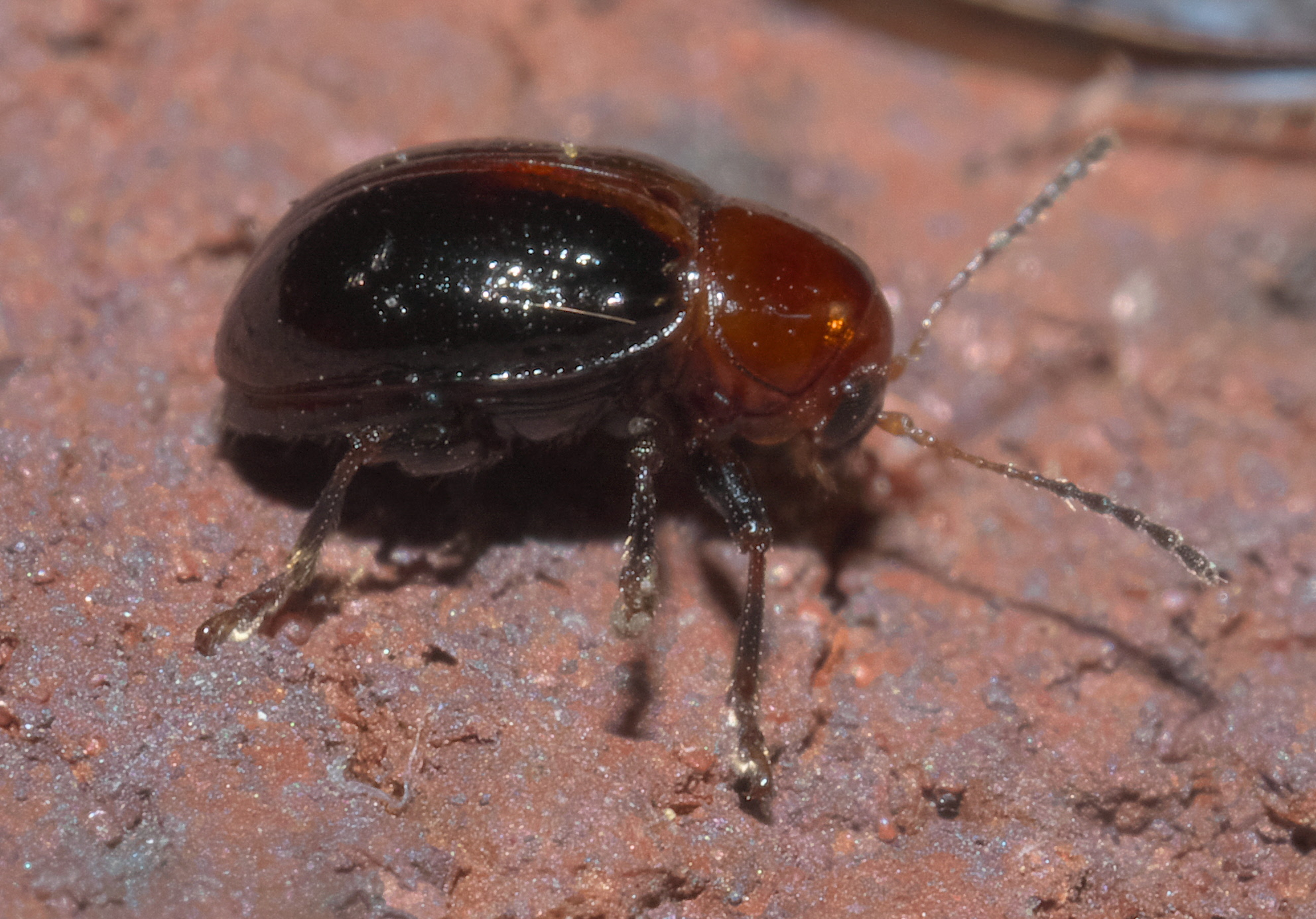
- Paria

Scientific classification
- Kingdom: Animalia
- Phylum: Arthropoda
- Clade: Pancrustacea
- Class: Insecta
- Order: Coleoptera
- Suborder: Polyphaga
- Infraorder: Cucujiformia
- Family: Chrysomelidae
- Subfamily: Eumolpinae
- Tribe: Typophorini; Baly, 1865

Synonyms
- Basileptini Chûjô, 1956; Callisini Chapuis, 1874; Cheirideini Lefèvre, 1885; Metachromini Chapuis, 1874; Nodini Selman, 1965; Nodinini Chen, 1940; Nodostomini Chapuis, 1874; Pagriini Lefèvre, 1884

= Typophorini =

Tribe of leaf beetles

Typophorini is a tribe of leaf beetles in the subfamily Eumolpinae. The tribe contains approximately 100 genera, which are found worldwide. Members of the tribe are mainly characterized by notches on the tibiae of the middle and hind legs, which are sometimes referred to as antenna cleaners. They also generally have a subglabrous body, as well as bifid pretarsal claws.

== Taxonomy ==
Following the leaf beetle classification of Seeno and Wilcox (1982), the genera of Typophorini are largely divided into five informal groups or "sections": Callisinites, Metachromites, Nodostomites, Pagriites and Typophorites, with some genera having incertae sedis placement within the tribe.

In the Catalog of the leaf beetles of America North of Mexico, published in 2003, the section Scelodontites of Bromiini was transferred to Typophorini.

== Genera ==
The following genera belong to the tribe Typophorini:

Section Nodostomites:

- Basilepta Baly, 1860
- Berliozita Bechyné, 1957
- Brachymolpus Fairmaire, 1903
- Cheiridea Baly, 1878
- Chrysonopa Jacoby, 1908
- Colaspibasa Medvedev, 1995
- Epinodostoma Bryant & Gressitt, 1957
- Mireditha Reitter, 1913
- Nodina Motschulsky, 1858
- Nodostella Jacoby, 1908
- Phaedroides Lefèvre, 1885
- Pseudolpus Jacoby, 1884
- Pseudostonopa Jacoby, 1903
- Scotosus Fairmaire, 1901
- Sedlacekia Gressitt, 1969
- Sybriacus Harold, 1877
- Weiselina Reitter, 1913
- Zavadilia Bechyné, 1946

Section Pagriites:

- Pagria Lefèvre, 1884
- Pagriella Medvedev, 1993

Section Callisinites:

- Callisina Baly, 1860
- Edistus Lefèvre, 1884

Section Metachromites:

- Ambohitsitondrona Bechyné, 1964
- Chrysopida Baly, 1861
- Clypeolaria Lefèvre, 1885
- Coniomma Weise, 1922
- Deretrichia Weise, 1913
- Ivongionymus Bechyné, 1946
- Jansonius Baly, 1878
- Keeta Maulik, 1931
- Labasa Bryant, 1925
- Lindinia Lefèvre, 1893
- Metachroma Chevrolat in Dejean, 1836
- Metacolaspis Horn, 1895
- Micromolpus Gressitt, 1969
- Nakanaia Gressitt, 1969
- Phainodina Gressitt, 1969
- Pyropida Baly, 1862
- Rhynchomolpus Gressitt, 1969
- Rhyparida Baly, 1861
- Rhyparidella Gressitt, 1969
- Sahantaha Bechyné, 1947
- Stizomolpus Gressitt, 1969
- Stygnobia Weise, 1922
- Vitibia Fairmaire, 1882

Section Typophorites:

- Afroeurydemus Selman, 1965
- Amblynetes Weise, 1904
- Ambodiriana Bechyné, 1953
- Andrahomana Bechyné, 1956
- Androyinus Bechyné, 1964
- Bastrhembus Bechyné, 1947
- Bathseba Motschulsky, 1866 (= Tricliona Lefèvre, 1885)
- Bedelia Lefèvre, 1875
- Chloropterus Morawitz, 1861
- Cleoparida Gressitt, 1967
- Cleoporus Lefèvre, 1884
- Cleorina Lefèvre, 1885
- Colasita Bechyné, 1964
- Entreriosa Bechyné, 1953
- Eulychius Jacoby, 1882
- Eurydemus Chapuis, 1874
- Gaberella Selman, 1965
- Hemigymna Weise, 1923
- Hemyloticus Jacoby, 1892
- Ivongius Harold, 1877
- Lebisiella Bechyné, 1947
- Lepidocolaspis Lea, 1915
- Mahatsinjoa Bechyné, 1964
- Majungaeus Bechyné, 1949
- Mandollia Selman, 1965
- Medvedemolpus Moseyko, 2010
- Meniellus Weise, 1903
- Menioporus Duvivier, 1891
- Menius Chapuis, 1874
- Microeurydemus Pic, 1938
- Microsyagrus Pic, 1952
- Mouhotina Lefèvre, 1885
- Nossioecus Harold, 1877
- Paraivongius Pic, 1936
- Paria LeConte, 1858
- Periparia Bechyné, 1951
- Pheloticus Harold, 1877
- Phytoparia Bechyné, 1957
- Phytorus Jacoby, 1884
- Proliniscus Selman, 1965
- Pseudivongius Jacoby, 1897
- Pseudosyagrus Fairmaire, 1886
- Rhembastichus Weise, 1908
- Rhembastus Harold, 1877
- Rhembivongius Bechyné, 1964
- Rhyparidula Weise, 1910
- Sandrananta Bechyné, 1964
- Sarum Selman, 1965
- Selmania Zoia, 2019 (= Massartia Selman, 1965)
- Stethotes Baly, 1867
- Syagrus Chapuis, 1874
- Thyrasia Jacoby, 1884
- Tijucana Bechyné, 1957
- Tricliophora Jacoby, 1904
- Trypocolaspis Lea, 1915
- Typophorus Chevrolat in Dejean, 1836
- Zohrana Aslam, 1968

incertae sedis genera:

- Iviva Gressitt, 1969
- Vadoniella Bechyné, 1947

Genera not placed in a section:

- Aphilenia Weise in Reitter, 1889
- Atomyria Jacobson, 1894
- Graphops LeConte, 1859 (formerly in Adoxini)
- Gressittana Medvedev, 2009
- Gressittella Medvedev, 2009
- Pagellia Lefèvre, 1885
- Parascela Baly, 1878
- Phytorellus Medvedev & Moseyko, 2003

== Gallery ==
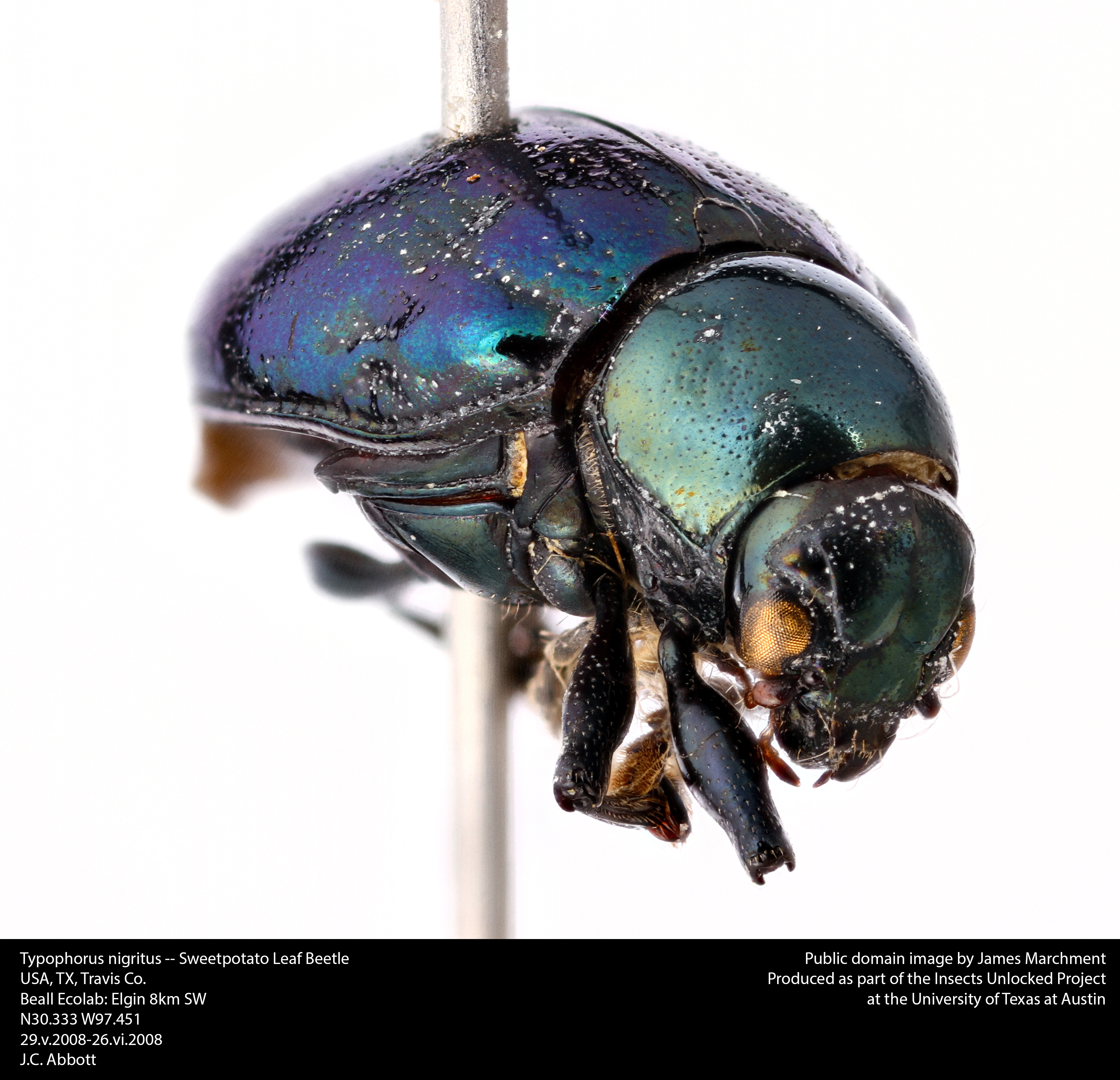
Typophorus nigritus
