= Percolaspis =

Scientific classification
- Kingdom: Animalia
- Phylum: Arthropoda
- Clade: Pancrustacea
- Class: Insecta
- Order: Coleoptera
- Suborder: Polyphaga
- Infraorder: Cucujiformia
- Family: Chrysomelidae
- Subfamily: Eumolpinae
- Tribe: Eumolpini
- Genus: Percolaspis; Bechyné, 1957

Type species
- Colaspis ornata Germar, 1824

Genus of leaf beetles

Percolaspis is a genus of leaf beetles in the subfamily Eumolpinae. It is distributed in South America and Central America, though it has also been reported from southern Florida in the United States. It is associated with the plant families Rubiaceae and Fabaceae in Central America.

In Brazil, Percolaspis ornata is an important pest of Theobroma cacao (cocoa) in Bahia and Espírito Santo. A species identified as Percolaspis cf. ornata was also recently found feeding and damaging soybean, corn and cotton crops in Mato Grosso, Brazil.

== Species ==
- Percolaspis acuticollis Bechyné & Bechyné, 1961
- Percolaspis aeraria (Lefèvre, 1885)
  - Percolaspis aeraria aeraria (Lefèvre, 1885)
  - Percolaspis aeraria uytenboogaarti (Bechyné, 1953)
- Percolaspis albicincta (Erichson, 1847)
  - Percolaspis albicincta albicincta (Erichson, 1847)
  - Percolaspis albicincta formosa (Lefèvre, 1878)
- Percolaspis atricha Bechyné & Bechyné, 1961
- Percolaspis boliviana (Bowditch, 1921)
- Percolaspis bucki (Bechyné, 1954)
- Percolaspis compta (Lefèvre, 1877)
  - Percolaspis compta compta (Lefèvre, 1877)
  - Percolaspis compta onca (Bechyné, 1950)
- Percolaspis concoloripes (Bechyné, 1950)
- Percolaspis gestroi (Jacoby, 1899)
- Percolaspis hypoxantha (Lefèvre, 1878)
- Percolaspis inquinata (Lefèvre, 1878)
  - Percolaspis inquinata acrocostata (Bechyné, 1957)
  - Percolaspis inquinata inquinata (Lefèvre, 1878)
  - Percolaspis inquinata quebracha (Bechyné, 1954)
  - Percolaspis inquinata venezulae (Jacoby, 1900)
- Percolaspis maculipes (Harold, 1875)
  - Percolaspis maculipes concupiens (Bechyné, 1951)
  - Percolaspis maculipes diminuta Bechyné, 1958
  - Percolaspis maculipes insignatior (Bechyné, 1954)
  - Percolaspis maculipes maculipes (Harold, 1875)
  - Percolaspis maculipes paraibensis Bechyné, 1958
  - Percolaspis maculipes portoalegrensis (Bechyné, 1954)
  - Percolaspis maculipes sculptissima (Bechyné, 1954)
  - Percolaspis maculipes sparsata Bechyné, 1958
- Percolaspis manca (Erichson, 1847)
- Percolaspis mapiriensis (Bechyné, 1951)
- Percolaspis microtricha Bechyné & Bechyné, 1961
- Percolaspis ornata (Germar, 1824)
  - Percolaspis ornata ornata (Germar, 1824)
  - Percolaspis ornata subtilis (Weise, 1929)
- Percolaspis pumilio (Lefèvre, 1884)
- Percolaspis retracta (Bechyné, 1951)
- Percolaspis rugosa (Germar, 1824)
  - Percolaspis rugosa godmani (Jacoby, 1881)
  - Percolaspis rugosa latipes Bechyné & Bechyné, 1965
  - Percolaspis rugosa polychroma (Bechyné, 1954)
  - Percolaspis rugosa pseudocompta (Bechyné, 1950)
  - Percolaspis rugosa pseudopulchella (Bechyné, 1950)
  - Percolaspis rugosa pulchella (Lefèvre, 1877)
  - Percolaspis rugosa rugosa (Germar, 1824)
  - Percolaspis rugosa sculpta (Jacoby, 1890)
- Percolaspis schizomorpha Bechyné & Bechyné, 1967
- Percolaspis stenopoda (Bechyné, 1951)
- Percolaspis traumatologica Bechyné & Bechyné, 1976
- Percolaspis varia (Lefèvre, 1884)
- Percolaspis zarah (Bechyné, 1954)

Synonyms:

- Colaspis pulchella insolvens (Bechyné, 1950): Synonym of Percolaspis rugosa (Germar, 1824)
