= Phytorus =

Scientific classification
- Kingdom: Animalia
- Phylum: Arthropoda
- Clade: Pancrustacea
- Class: Insecta
- Order: Coleoptera
- Suborder: Polyphaga
- Infraorder: Cucujiformia
- Family: Chrysomelidae
- Subfamily: Eumolpinae
- Tribe: Typophorini
- Genus: Phytorus; Jacoby, 1884

Type species
- Phytorus dilatatus Jacoby, 1884

Genus of leaf beetles from Southeast Asia

Phytorus is a genus of leaf beetles in the subfamily Eumolpinae. It is distributed in Southeast Asia.

== Species ==
- Phytorus antennalis Medvedev & Moseyko, 2003 – Philippines (Palawan)
- Phytorus cyclopterus Lefèvre, 1885 – Philippines (Mindanao, Basilan)
- Phytorus dilatatus Jacoby, 1884 – Singapore, Malay Peninsula, Java, Sumatra, Borneo (Kalimantan), Philippines
- Phytorus laysi Medvedev & Moseyko, 2003 – Philippines (Mindanao)
- Phytorus pinguis (Baly, 1867) – Borneo, Sumatra

Synonyms and species moved to other genera:

- Phytorus assimilis Lefèvre, 1890: moved to Rhyparida
- Phytorus fervidus Lefèvre, 1885: moved to Rhyparida
- Phytorus gibbosus Lefèvre, 1885: moved to Phytorellus
- Phytorus latus Weise, 1910: moved to Phytorellus
- Phytorus leyteanus Medvedev, 1995: moved to Rhyparida
- Phytorus lineolatus Weise, 1913: moved to Rhyparida
- Phytorus nigripes Lefèvre, 1885: moved to Rhyparida
- Phytorus pallidus Lefèvre, 1890: moved to Rhyparida
- Phytorus plebejus Lefèvre, 1885: moved to Rhyparida
- Phytorus puncticollis Lefèvre, 1885: synonym of Phytorus dilatatus Jacoby, 1884
- Phytorus simplex Lefèvre, 1885: moved to Rhyparida, synonym of Rhyparida lineolata (Weise, 1913)
- Phytorus tibiellus Weise, 1922: moved to Rhyparida
- Phytorus tonkinensis Lefèvre, 1893: moved to Tricliona
