= Endocephalus =

Scientific classification
- Kingdom: Animalia
- Phylum: Arthropoda
- Clade: Pancrustacea
- Class: Insecta
- Order: Coleoptera
- Suborder: Polyphaga
- Infraorder: Cucujiformia
- Family: Chrysomelidae
- Subfamily: Eumolpinae
- Tribe: Eumolpini
- Genus: Endocephalus; Chevrolat in Dejean, 1836

Type species
- Eumolpus bigatus (= Cryptocephalus lineatus Fabricius, 1775) Germar, 1824

Synonyms
- Biorus Lefèvre, 1875

Genus of leaf beetles from South America

Endocephalus is a genus of leaf beetles in the subfamily Eumolpinae. It is distributed in South America.

== Species ==
- Endocephalus clytroides (Lefèvre, 1875) – French Guiana
- Endocephalus fasciatus Lefèvre, 1889 – Brazil
- Endocephalus femoralis (Lefèvre, 1875) – Brazil
- Endocephalus flavipennis Guérin, 1855 – Brazil (Amazonas, Mato Grosso, Goiás, Minas Gerais, São Paulo, Espírito Santo, Bahia)
- Endocephalus freyi Bechyné, 1950 – Brazil (Amazonas)
- Endocephalus geniculatus Guérin, 1855 – Brazil (Amazonas, Minas Gerais, Espírito Santo, Rio de Janeiro, São Paulo, Paraná, Santa Catarina)
- Endocephalus lefevrei Harold, 1874 – Brazil (Bahia)
- Endocephalus lineatus (Fabricius, 1775) – Brazil (Minas Gerais, Espírito Santo, Rio de Janeiro, São Paulo, Paraná, Santa Catarina, Rio Grande do Sul), Paraguay, Argentina
- Endocephalus maronicus Bechyné, 1949 – French Guiana
- Endocephalus militaris Jacoby, 1900 – Brazil (Espírito Santo)
- Endocephalus nigripes Jacoby, 1900 – Brazil (Espírito Santo)
- Endocephalus novogranadensis Bechyné, 1950 – Colombia
- Endocephalus octopunctatus (Germar, 1824) – Brazil (Minas Gerais, Rio de Janeiro, São Paulo, Paraná, Santa Catarina)
- Endocephalus quadripunctatus Lefèvre, 1875 – Brazil
- Endocephalus spilotus Baly, 1865 – Brazil (Amazonas), Bolivia
- Endocephalus suffriani (Harold, 1874)
  - Endocephalus suffriani paraguayensis (Jacoby, 1900) – Paraguay
  - Endocephalus suffriani suffriani (Harold, 1874) – Brazil (Mato Grosso, Bahia), Bolivia, Argentina
- Endocephalus tibialis Jacoby, 1900 – Brazil

Synonyms:

- Endocephalus biguttatus Lefèvre, 1875: synonym of Endocephalus flavipennis Guérin, 1855
- Endocephalus fenestratus Harold, 1874: synonym of Endocephalus flavipennis Guérin, 1855
- Endocephalus fulvicollis Lefèvre, 1891: synonym of Endocephalus suffriani (Harold, 1874)
