= Majungaeus =

Scientific classification
- Kingdom: Animalia
- Phylum: Arthropoda
- Clade: Pancrustacea
- Class: Insecta
- Order: Coleoptera
- Suborder: Polyphaga
- Infraorder: Cucujiformia
- Family: Chrysomelidae
- Subfamily: Eumolpinae
- Tribe: Typophorini
- Genus: Majungaeus; Bechyné, 1949

Type species
- Rhembastus striatus Harold, 1877

Genus of leaf beetles

Majungaeus is a genus of leaf beetles in the subfamily Eumolpinae. It is distributed in Madagascar.

== Species ==
- Majungaeus coeruleus Bechyné, 1964 – Antsiranana
- Majungaeus fenerivensis Bechyné, 1964 – Analanjirofo region
- Majungaeus fulvitarsis (Jacoby, 1901)
  - Majungaeus fulvitarsis fulvitarsis (Jacoby, 1901) – Antsiranana
  - Majungaeus fulvitarsis laetabilis Bechyné, 1949 – Nandihizana
  - Majungaeus fulvitarsis reticulatus Bechyné, 1949 – Mandritsara; Suberbieville; Analanjirofo region
- Majungaeus lambomakandrensis Bechyné, 1964 – Lambomakandro
- Majungaeus punctatosulcatus (Fairmaire, 1886) – Nosy Be
- Majungaeus rubricollis Bechyné, 1949 – Ambovombe-Androy; Haut-Mandrare
- Majungaeus rufus (Brancsik, 1893) – Nosy Be
- Majungaeus simplex Bechyné, 1964 – Lekobe Andranohimanonga
- Majungaeus striatus (Harold, 1877) – north Madagascar
- Majungaeus suturalis (Harold, 1877) – Antananarivo; Analanjirofo region; Fianarantsoa; Nosy Boraha; Antsianaka; Fort-Dauphin; Antsiranana
- Majungaeus unicolor (Jacoby, 1897) – Mahajanga; Amboanio
- Majungaeus vittatus Bechyné, 1949 – Antsiranana
