= Bedelia =

Bedelia may refer to:

== Media ==
- Bedelia (novel), a 1945 novel by Vera Caspary
- Bedelia (film), a 1946 film adaptation of the novel
- "Bedelia" (song), a hit song in 1903 by William Jerome and Jean Schwartz

=== Characters ===
- Amelia Bedelia, the protagonist and title character of a series of American children's books written by Peggy Parish
- Bedelia Du Maurier, a fictional character in the TV series Hannibal
- Bedelia (Saturday Night Live), a character in three Saturday Night Live episodes

== Other uses ==
- Bédélia, the archetype of the French cyclecars
- Bonnie Bedelia (born 1948), American actress
- Bedelia (beetle), a genus of leaf beetles
