= Zavadilia =

Scientific classification
- Kingdom: Animalia
- Phylum: Arthropoda
- Clade: Pancrustacea
- Class: Insecta
- Order: Coleoptera
- Suborder: Polyphaga
- Infraorder: Cucujiformia
- Family: Chrysomelidae
- Subfamily: Eumolpinae
- Tribe: Typophorini
- Genus: Zavadilia; Bechyné, 1946

Type species
- Nodostoma magnificum Baly, 1877

Genus of leaf beetles from Madagascar

Zavadilia is a genus of leaf beetles in the subfamily Eumolpinae. It is known from two described species endemic to Madagascar. The genus was named in honor of hymenopterist Vilém Zavadil on the occasion of his 70th birthday.

== Species ==
- Zavadilia magnifica (Baly, 1877) – Mahatsinjo near Antananarivo; Antsianaka; Toamasina; Bealanana
- Zavadilia major Bechyné, 1946 – "Madagascar"
