= Chrysolampra =

Scientific classification
- Kingdom: Animalia
- Phylum: Arthropoda
- Clade: Pancrustacea
- Class: Insecta
- Order: Coleoptera
- Suborder: Polyphaga
- Infraorder: Cucujiformia
- Family: Chrysomelidae
- Subfamily: Eumolpinae
- Tribe: Eumolpini
- Genus: Chrysolampra; Baly, 1859

Type species
- Chrysolampra splendens Baly, 1859

Genus of leaf beetles

Chrysolampra is a genus of leaf beetles in the subfamily Eumolpinae. It is distributed in South Asia, Southeast Asia, Southern China and northeastern Australia. It is very closely related to Colaspoides, and is possibly a subgenus of it according to L. N. Medvedev (2004).

== Species ==
- Chrysolampra angustula Weise, 1923 – Australia (Queensland)
- Chrysolampra bicolorata Jacoby, 1908 – Myanmar
- Chrysolampra burmanica Jacoby, 1908 – Myanmar
- Chrysolampra cuprithorax Chen, 1935 – Vietnam
- Chrysolampra curvipes Jacoby, 1889 – Myanmar
- Chrysolampra cyanea Lefèvre, 1884 – South China
- Chrysolampra dentipes Medvedev, 2006 – Vietnam
- Chrysolampra fedorenkoi Medvedev, 2006 – Vietnam
- Chrysolampra flavipes Jacoby, 1899 – Northeast India (Meghalaya, Tripura)
- Chrysolampra hirta Tan, 1982 – Southwest China (Yunnan)
- Chrysolampra imbecilla Weise, 1923 – Australia (Queensland)
- Chrysolampra indica Jacoby, 1908 – Northeast India (Meghalaya), Myanmar
- Chrysolampra kimotoi Medvedev, 2006 – Thailand
- Chrysolampra laosensis Kimoto & Gressitt, 1982 – Laos
- Chrysolampra longitarsis Tan, 1982 – Southwest China (Yunnan)
- Chrysolampra malayana Medvedev, 2016 – Peninsular Malaysia
- Chrysolampra manipurensis Jacoby, 1908 – Northeast India (Manipur)
- Chrysolampra medvedevi Moseyko & Sprecher-Uebersax, 2010 – Afghanistan
- Chrysolampra minuta Jacoby, 1892 – Myanmar
- Chrysolampra mjoebergi Weise, 1923 – Australia (Queensland)
- Chrysolampra modesta Weise, 1923 – Australia (Queensland)
- Chrysolampra monstrosa Tan, 1988 – Southwest China (Xizang)
- Chrysolampra mouhoti Baly, 1864 – Thailand, Laos, Vietnam
- Chrysolampra nathani Medvedev, 2000
- Chrysolampra purpurea Medvedev, 2010 – Vietnam
- Chrysolampra rufimembris Pic, 1926 – Vietnam
- Chrysolampra rugosa Tan, 1982 – Southwest China (Yunnan)
- Chrysolampra smaragdula (Boheman, 1859) – South China (Hong Kong)
- Chrysolampra splendens Baly, 1859 – Cambodia, Laos, Vietnam, South China
- Chrysolampra subaenea Jacoby, 1908 – Myanmar
- Chrysolampra thailandica Medvedev, 2006 – Thailand
- Chrysolampra thoracica Jacoby, 1899 – Northeast India (Meghalaya), Bangladesh (Sylhet)
- Chrysolampra varicolor Jacoby, 1892 – Myanmar
- Chrysolampra viridicollis Jacoby, 1908 – Myanmar
- Chrysolampra viridis Weise, 1923 – Australia (Queensland)
- Chrysolampra weigeli Medvedev, 2018 – Vietnam

Synonyms:

- Chrysolampra minuta Kimoto & Gressitt, 1982 nec Jacoby, 1892: renamed to Chrysolampra kimotoi Medvedev, 2006
- Chrysolampra tuberculata Medvedev, 2005 nec Pic, 1926: renamed to Chrysolampra medvedevi Moseyko & Sprecher-Uebersax, 2010
