= Eulychius =

Scientific classification
- Kingdom: Animalia
- Phylum: Arthropoda
- Clade: Pancrustacea
- Class: Insecta
- Order: Coleoptera
- Suborder: Polyphaga
- Infraorder: Cucujiformia
- Family: Chrysomelidae
- Subfamily: Eumolpinae
- Tribe: Typophorini
- Genus: Eulychius; Jacoby, 1882

Type species
- Eulychius madagascariensis Jacoby, 1882

Genus of leaf beetles from Madagascar

Eulychius is a genus of leaf beetles in the subfamily Eumolpinae. It is found in Madagascar.

== Species ==
Subgenus Eulychius Jacoby, 1882

- Eulychius madagascariensis Jacoby, 1882 – Mahatsinjo; Ikongo; Ambositra; Mandraka; Antananarivo; Maromandia; Rogez; Ankarampotsy; Toamasina; Analanjirofo; Antsianaka; Tanala forest
- Eulychius subviolaceus Weise, 1910 – Mahatsinjo; Ambohitsitondrona; Nandihizana

Subgenus Eulychioides Bechyné, 1947 (type species: Eulychius nigritarsis Jacoby, 1892)

- Eulychius dentipes Bechyné, 1947 – Ambohitsitondrona
- Eulychius nigritarsis Jacoby, 1892 – "Madagascar"
- Eulychius sulcatus Bechyné, 1947 – "Madagascar"
