= Pseudostola =

Scientific classification
- Kingdom: Animalia
- Phylum: Arthropoda
- Clade: Pancrustacea
- Class: Insecta
- Order: Coleoptera
- Suborder: Polyphaga
- Infraorder: Cucujiformia
- Family: Chrysomelidae
- Subfamily: Eumolpinae
- Tribe: Bromiini
- Genus: Pseudostola; Fairmaire, 1899

Genus of leaf beetles from Madagascar

Pseudostola is a genus of leaf beetles in the subfamily Eumolpinae. It is endemic to Madagascar.

== Species ==
Species include:

- Pseudostola amoena Bechyné, 1949 – Mahajanga
- Pseudostola fulvida Fairmaire, 1902 – Suberbieville
- Pseudostola grandis (Fairmaire, 1901) – Suberbieville
- Pseudostola ornata Zoia, 2019 – Andasibe
- Pseudostola perrieri Fairmaire, 1899 – Suberbieville
- Pseudostola tuberculicollis Bechyné, 1946 – Vohemar

Synonyms:

- Pseudostola grandis Fairmaire, 1902: synonym of Pseudostola grandis (Fairmaire, 1901)
