= Meniellus maculicollis =

Scientific classification
- Kingdom: Animalia
- Phylum: Arthropoda
- Clade: Pancrustacea
- Class: Insecta
- Order: Coleoptera
- Suborder: Polyphaga
- Infraorder: Cucujiformia
- Family: Chrysomelidae
- Genus: Meniellus
- Species: M. maculicollis

Binomial name
- Meniellus maculicollis (Jacoby, 1897)

Synonyms
- Rhembastus maculicollis Jacoby, 1897

Species of beetle

Meniellus maculicollis is a species of leaf beetle. It is distributed in eastern Nigeria, the Democratic Republic of the Congo, Sudan and Ivory Coast. It was described by Martin Jacoby in 1897.
