= Taphioporus =

Taphioporus Temporal range: Upper Eocene

Scientific classification
- Kingdom: Animalia
- Phylum: Arthropoda
- Clade: Pancrustacea
- Class: Insecta
- Order: Coleoptera
- Suborder: Polyphaga
- Infraorder: Cucujiformia
- Family: Chrysomelidae
- Subfamily: Eumolpinae
- Tribe: Euryopini
- Genus: †Taphioporus; Moseyko & Kirejtshuk, 2013

Type species
- Taphioporus balticus Moseyko & Kirejtshuk, 2013

Extinct genus of leaf beetles

Taphioporus is an extinct genus of leaf beetles in the subfamily Eumolpinae. It is known from Baltic and Rovno amber from the upper Eocene.

The generic name is a combination of the generic names Taphius (the old name for Pathius) and Cleoporus.

== Species ==
- †Taphioporus balticus Moseyko & Kirejtshuk, 2013
- †Taphioporus carsteni Bukejs & Moseyko, 2015
- †Taphioporus hanseaticus Bukejs, Moseyko & Alekseev, 2024
- †Taphioporus rovnoi Moseyko & Perkovsky, 2015
- †Taphioporus rufous Bukejs & Moseyko, 2015
