= Proliniscus =

Scientific classification
- Kingdom: Animalia
- Phylum: Arthropoda
- Clade: Pancrustacea
- Class: Insecta
- Order: Coleoptera
- Suborder: Polyphaga
- Infraorder: Cucujiformia
- Family: Chrysomelidae
- Subfamily: Eumolpinae
- Tribe: Typophorini
- Genus: Proliniscus; Selman, 1965

Type species
- Liniscus natalensis Lefèvre, 1891

Genus of leaf beetles from Africa

Proliniscus is a genus of leaf beetles in the subfamily Eumolpinae, found in Africa. Most of its species were originally placed in Liniscus (now known as Zohranus) or Syagrus.

== Species ==
- Proliniscus antennatus (Jacoby, 1900) – South Africa
- Proliniscus cylindriformis (Jacoby, 1897) – Zimbabwe
- Proliniscus dombeyae (Bryant, 1941) – South Africa
- Proliniscus garambaensis Selman, 1972 – DR Congo
- Proliniscus minutus (Jacoby, 1895) – Togo
- Proliniscus natalensis (Lefèvre, 1891) – South Africa, Tanzania
- Proliniscus parvulus (Jacoby, 1899) – Ethiopia, Somalia
- Proliniscus puncticollis (Jacoby, 1900) – Mozambique
- Proliniscus viridis Selman, 1973 – Ivory Coast
