= Cayetunya =

Scientific classification
- Kingdom: Animalia
- Phylum: Arthropoda
- Clade: Pancrustacea
- Class: Insecta
- Order: Coleoptera
- Suborder: Polyphaga
- Infraorder: Cucujiformia
- Family: Chrysomelidae
- Subfamily: Eumolpinae
- Tribe: Eumolpini
- Genus: Cayetunya; Bechyné, 1958

Type species
- Cayetunya breesei Bechyné, 1958

Genus of leaf beetles from Central and South America

Cayetunya is a genus of leaf beetles in the subfamily Eumolpinae. It is known from Central and South America. It was first described by the Czech entomologist Jan Bechyné in 1958.

Most species in this genus are known to display strong sexual dimorphism, such that males and females could be mistaken for separate genera. The female of C. clarki is unknown.

== Species ==
- Cayetunya breesei Bechyné, 1958 – Trinidad, Venezuela
- Cayetunya clarki Flowers, 1997 – Venezuela
- Cayetunya colombiana Flowers, 1997 – Colombia
- Cayetunya consanguinea (Blake, 1976) – Panama
- Cayetunya tifferae Flowers, 1997 (incorrectly formed as C. tifferi) – Costa Rica to Honduras
