= Cleoporus =

Scientific classification
- Kingdom: Animalia
- Phylum: Arthropoda
- Clade: Pancrustacea
- Class: Insecta
- Order: Coleoptera
- Suborder: Polyphaga
- Infraorder: Cucujiformia
- Family: Chrysomelidae
- Subfamily: Eumolpinae
- Tribe: Typophorini
- Genus: Cleoporus; Lefèvre, 1884

Type species
- Cleoporus cruciatus (= Typophorus quadripustulatus Baly, 1859) Lefèvre, 1884

Genus of leaf beetles from Asia

Cleoporus is a genus of leaf beetles in the subfamily Eumolpinae. It is distributed in South, East and Southeast Asia.

== Species ==
- Cleoporus aedilis (Weise, 1922) – Philippines (Luzon)
- Cleoporus aeneipennis Chen, 1935 – Vietnam
- Cleoporus aenescens (Jacoby, 1908) – Myanmar
- Cleoporus badius Lefèvre, 1889 – Thailand, Cambodia, Laos, Vietnam, China (Guangdong, Guangxi, Hainan, Hong Kong, Hunan)
- Cleoporus costatus Chûjô, 1956 – Taiwan
- Cleoporus cuprescens (Baly, 1878) (doubtful assignment) – Pakistan, India
- Cleoporus dalatensis Medvedev, 1998 – Vietnam
- Cleoporus harmandi Lefèvre, 1893 – Vietnam
- Cleoporus inornatus Jacoby, 1908 – India, Sri Lanka
- Cleoporus laevifrons (Jacoby, 1908) – Myanmar
- Cleoporus lateralis (Motschulsky, 1866) – India, Myanmar
- Cleoporus lefevrei Duvivier, 1892 – Bengal
- Cleoporus lineatus Medvedev & Sprecher-Uebersax, 1999 – Nepal
- Cleoporus maculicollis Jacoby, 1904 – India (Khandesh)
- Cleoporus pallidipes (Fairmaire, 1888) – China (Jiangxi)
- Cleoporus plagiatus Jacoby, 1892 – Myanmar
- Cleoporus quadripustulatus (Baly, 1859) – Philippines (Mindanao)
- Cleoporus recticollis (Pic, 1929) – North Vietnam
- Cleoporus robustus (Baly, 1874) – East and South China, South Korea, Japan
- Cleoporus similis Medvedev & Eroshkina, 1985 – Vietnam
- Cleoporus sumbaensis Jacoby, 1899 – Sumba
- Cleoporus suturalis Chen, 1935 – China (Guangdong, Hainan), Vietnam
- Cleoporus taynguensis Medvedev & Eroshkina, 1985 – Vietnam
- Cleoporus tibialis (Lefèvre, 1885) – Vietnam
- Cleoporus timorensis Jacoby, 1894 – Timor
- Cleoporus trimaculatus Kimoto & Gressitt, 1982 – Thailand
- Cleoporus udovichenkoi Medvedev & Romantsov, 2013 – South Vietnam
- Cleoporus variabilis (Baly, 1874) – Russia (southern Far East), North-Eastern China, Taiwan, North Korea, Japan
- Cleoporus vietnamensis Medvedev & Eroshkina, 1985 – Vietnam

The following are synonyms of other species:

- Cleoporus birmanicus Jacoby, 1892: synonym of Cleoporus lateralis (Motschulsky, 1866)
- Cleoporus cruciatus Lefèvre, 1884: synonym of Cleoporus quadripustulatus (Baly, 1859)
- Cleoporus jacobyi Medvedev & Eroshkina, 1985 (replacement name for Cleoporus lefevrei Jacoby, 1895 nec Duvivier, 1892): synonym of Cleoporus inornatus Jacoby, 1908
- Cleoporus lefevrei Jacoby, 1895 nec Duvivier, 1892: synonym of Cleoporus inornatus Jacoby, 1908
- Cleoporus variegatus Jacoby, 1904: transferred to Bathseba
