= Nodina =

Scientific classification
- Kingdom: Animalia
- Phylum: Arthropoda
- Clade: Pancrustacea
- Class: Insecta
- Order: Coleoptera
- Suborder: Polyphaga
- Infraorder: Cucujiformia
- Family: Chrysomelidae
- Subfamily: Eumolpinae
- Tribe: Typophorini
- Genus: Nodina; Motschulsky, 1858

Type species
- Nodina pusilla Motschulsky, 1858

Genus of leaf beetles

Kimoto, S. 1985. Check-list of Chrysomelidae of South East Asia, South of Thailand and West of Irian-Jaya of Indonesia, IV. Eumolpinae, 2. Kurume University Journal 34(2): 153–177. Nodina is a genus of leaf beetles in the subfamily Eumolpinae. It is distributed in South, East and Southeast Asia.

== Species ==
- Nodina aeneicollis Jacoby, 1895 – Southern India, Nepal
- Nodina alpicola Weise, 1889 – Southwest China (Sichuan)
- Nodina apicipes Jacoby, 1896 – Mentawai Islands
- Nodina baliana Medvedev & Takizawa, 2011 – Bali
- Nodina balyi Jacoby, 1896 – Sumatra
- Nodina belgaumensis Jacoby, 1908 – Southern India (Belgaum)
- Nodina bicoloripes Medvedev, 2015 – Southwest China (Yunnan)
- Nodina birmanica Jacoby, 1892 – Myanmar
- Nodina brevicostata Jacoby, 1896 – Sumatra
- Nodina celebensis Jacoby, 1885 – Sulawesi
- Nodina ceramensis Baly, 1867 – Seram
- Nodina ceylonensis Jacoby, 1908 – Sri Lanka
- Nodina chalcosoma Baly, 1874 – Japan, Ryukyu Islands, Taiwan, Southern China
- Nodina chinensis Weise, 1922 – China
- Nodina cibulskisi Medvedev, 2013 – Sumatra
- Nodina clypeata Kimoto & Gressitt, 1982 – Thailand, Laos
- Nodina coerulea Chen, 1940 – Thailand, Laos, Vietnam, Southwest China (Yunnan)
- Nodina cyanea Chen, 1940 – East China (Zhejiang)
- Nodina dhadinga Medvedev, 1992 – Nepal
- Nodina fulvipes Baly, 1867 – Borneo
- Nodina fulvitarsis Jacoby, 1896 – Bali, Sumatra
- Nodina gigas Baly, 1867 – Borneo
- Nodina hongshana Gressitt & Kimoto, 1961 – Southern China (Jiangxi)
- Nodina hirta Jacoby, 1908 – Southern India (Nilgiris)
- Nodina issikii Chûjô, 1956 – Taiwan, Ryukyu Islands
- Nodina kraussi Kimoto & Gressitt, 1966 – Ryukyu Islands
- Nodina laevicollis Motschulsky, 1858 – India
- Nodina laotica Medvedev, 2000 – Laos
- Nodina liui Gressitt & Kimoto, 1961 – Southwest China (Yunnan)
- Nodina luzonica Weise, 1922 – Philippines
- Nodina malayana Bryant, 1941 – Peninsular Malaysia
- Nodina malayana Medvedev, 2016 (homonym) – Peninsular Malaysia
- Nodina mandibularis Medvedev, 2015 – North Vietnam
- Nodina martensi Medvedev, 1992 – Nepal
- Nodina mengi Medvedev, 2015 – Southwest China (Yunnan)
- Nodina meridiosinica Gressitt & Kimoto, 1961 – Southern China (Guangdong, Jiangxi, Hainan)
- Nodina minuta Baly, 1867 – Philippines
- Nodina minutissima Kimoto & Gressitt, 1982 – Vietnam
- Nodina morimotoi Kimoto & Gressitt, 1966 – Ryukyu Islands
- Nodina nepalensis Takizawa, 1987 – Nepal, India
- Nodina nigrilabrum Jacoby, 1908 – Southern India
- Nodina nigripes Jacoby, 1896 – Sumatra
- Nodina obliquocostata Medvedev, 2011 – Nepal
- Nodina parva Gressitt & Kimoto, 1961 – Southern China (Hainan)
- Nodina parvula Jacoby, 1892 – Myanmar, Nepal
- Nodina philippina Medvedev, 1995 – Philippines
- Nodina pilifrons Chen, 1940 – Southern China
- Nodina polilovi Medvedev, 2010 – South Vietnam
- Nodina punctostriolata (Fairmaire, 1888) – Southern China, Thailand, Laos, Vietnam
- Nodina pusilla Motschulsky, 1858 – India, Thailand, Vietnam
- Nodina robusta Jacoby, 1892 – India, Nepal, Myanmar
- Nodina rufipes Jacoby, 1908 – Myanmar
- Nodina santula Weise, 1922 – Philippines
- Nodina sauteri Chûjô, 1956 – Taiwan
- Nodina separata Baly, 1867 – Borneo (Sarawak)
- Nodina similis Kimoto & Gressitt, 1982 – Thailand
- Nodina sphaerica Chen, 1940 – Vietnam
- Nodina striopunctata Tan, 1988 – China (Xizang)
- Nodina subcostata Jacoby, 1908 – India (Manipur)
- Nodina subdiliata Motschulsky, 1858 – India
- Nodina sumatrana Jacoby, 1896 – Sumatra
- Nodina taliana Chen, 1940 – Southwest China (Yunnan)
- Nodina tarsalis Duvivier, 1892 – Bengal, Malabar
- Nodina thaiensis Chûjô, 1960 – Thailand
- Nodina tibialis Chen, 1940 – Southern China
- Nodina tricarinata Gressitt & Kimoto, 1961 – Southern China (Guangdong, Jiangxi, Hainan)
- Nodina tricostata Jacoby, 1894 – Sulawesi
- Nodina tricostata Takizawa, 2017 (homonym) – Borneo (Sabah)

Synonyms:

- Nodina chinensis Bryant, 1924 (preoccupied by N. chinensis Weise, 1922): synonym of Nodina punctostriolata (Fairmaire, 1888)
- Nodina crassipes Jacoby, 1908: synonym of Nodina robusta Jacoby, 1892
- Nodina fulvicollis Jacoby, 1899: moved to Aulacia
- Nodina indica Jacoby, 1895: synonym of Nodina robusta Jacoby, 1892
- Nodina major Kimoto & Gressitt, 1982: synonym of Nodina robusta Jacoby, 1892
- Nodina metallica Bryant, 1937: synonym of Nodina punctostriolata (Fairmaire, 1888)
- Nodina rotundata Motschulsky, 1858: synonym of Nodina subdiliata Motschulsky, 1858
