= Phainodina =

Scientific classification
- Kingdom: Animalia
- Phylum: Arthropoda
- Clade: Pancrustacea
- Class: Insecta
- Order: Coleoptera
- Suborder: Polyphaga
- Infraorder: Cucujiformia
- Family: Chrysomelidae
- Subfamily: Eumolpinae
- Tribe: Typophorini
- Genus: Phainodina; Gressitt, 1969

Type species
- Rhyparida picta Baly, 1867

Genus of leaf beetles

Phainodina is a genus of leaf beetles in the subfamily Eumolpinae, that is distributed in New Guinea. It resembles the genera Rhyparida and Rhyparidella, but differs from the former by its lack of a "Y"-shaped suture on the frontoclypeus (a combined frons and clypeus, making up part of the face), and from the latter by having a larger tooth on the underside of each femur on the legs, having a more swollen prothorax that generally lacks punctures, and being generally quite convex and evenly rounded at the sides. The name of the genus refers to the beetles being shiny and Nodina-shaped.

== Species ==
- Phainodina alphiniae Gressitt, 1969 – Western New Guinea: West Papua (Fakfak)
- Phainodina alticola Gressitt, 1969 – Papua New Guinea (Enga)
- Phainodina antennalis Medvedev, 2009 – Western New Guinea: West Papua (Arfak Mountains)
- Phainodina brandtella Gressitt, 1969 – Papua New Guinea (Western)
- Phainodina femorata Medvedev, 2009 – Papua New Guinea (Sandaun), Western New Guinea: Highland Papua (Jayawijaya)
- Phainodina guineensis (Bryant, 1950) – Biak, Yapen
- Phainodina ornata Gressitt, 1969 – Papua New Guinea (Western Highlands, Chimbu, Southern Highlands), Star Mountains, Western New Guinea: Central Papua (Paniai), West Papua (Fakfak)
- Phainodina picta (Baly, 1867) – Western New Guinea: West Papua (Manokwari, Bomberai Peninsula)
- Phainodina riedeli Medvedev, 2009 – Western New Guinea: West Papua (Manokwari, Arfak Mountains)
- Phainodina strigicollis Medvedev, 2017 – Western New Guinea (Bird's Head Peninsula)
- Phainodina stygica Gressitt, 1969 – Western New Guinea: Papua (Jayapura), Biak
- Phainodina subcorrugata Gressitt, 1969 – Western New Guinea: Central Papua (Paniai, Dogiyai)
- Phainodina thoracica Medvedev, 2017 – Western New Guinea (Bird's Head Peninsula)
