= Dermorhytis =

Scientific classification
- Kingdom: Animalia
- Phylum: Arthropoda
- Clade: Pancrustacea
- Class: Insecta
- Order: Coleoptera
- Suborder: Polyphaga
- Infraorder: Cucujiformia
- Family: Chrysomelidae
- Subfamily: Eumolpinae
- Tribe: Eumolpini
- Genus: Dermorhytis; Baly, 1861

Type species
- Dermorhytis igneofasciata Baly, 1861

Synonyms
- Dermorrhytis Clavareau, 1914

Genus of leaf beetles from Asia

Dermorhytis is a genus of leaf beetles in the subfamily Eumolpinae. It is found in south Asia, southeast Asia and southwest China.

== Species ==
The following species are placed in the genus:

- Dermorhytis andrewesi Jacoby, 1895 – Southern India (Kanara)
- Dermorhytis atkinsoni Jacoby, 1908 – Bangladesh (Kulaura)
- Dermorhytis biangulata Jacoby, 1908 – Southern India (Nilgiris)
- Dermorhytis ceylonensis Jacoby, 1887 – Sri Lanka
- Dermorhytis costata Jacoby, 1908 – Myanmar (Karen Hills)
- Dermorhytis cuprea Jacoby, 1887 – Sri Lanka
- Dermorhytis foveata Tan, 1982 – Southwestern China (Yunnan)
- Dermorhytis fulvipes Jacoby, 1903 – Southern India (Pondicherry, Nilgiris)
- Dermorhytis igneofasciata Baly, 1861 – Sri Lanka
- Dermorhytis imitans Jacoby, 1908 – Southern India (Nilgiris)
- Dermorhytis kandyensis Jacoby, 1908 – Sri Lanka
- Dermorhytis lewisi Jacoby, 1887 – Sri Lanka
- Dermorhytis martini Allard, 1895 – Madura
- Dermorhytis ornatissima Baly, 1864 – Sri Lanka
- Dermorhytis punctatissima (Jacoby, 1887) – Sri Lanka
- Dermorhytis rugosa Jacoby, 1908 – Sri Lanka
- Dermorhytis speciosa Jacoby, 1895 – Southern India (Kanara)
- Dermorhytis variabilis Jacoby, 1887 – Sri Lanka
- Dermorhytis violacea Jacoby, 1908 – Sri Lanka
- Dermorhytis viridinitens Jacoby, 1908 – Southern India (Travancore)
- Dermorhytis viridis Jacoby, 1884 – Sulawesi
- Dermorhytis yunnanensis Tan & Wang, 1984 – Southwestern China (Yunnan)

Synonyms:

- Dermorhytis fortunei Baly, 1861: moved to Abirus
- Dermorhytis hirsuta (Jacoby, 1900): synonym of Lophea melancholica Baly, 1865
- Dermorhytis longipes Jacoby, 1894: moved to Chrysonopa
