= Ambohitsitondrona (beetle) =

Scientific classification
- Kingdom: Animalia
- Phylum: Arthropoda
- Clade: Pancrustacea
- Class: Insecta
- Order: Coleoptera
- Suborder: Polyphaga
- Infraorder: Cucujiformia
- Family: Chrysomelidae
- Subfamily: Eumolpinae
- Tribe: Typophorini
- Genus: Ambohitsitondrona; Bechyné, 1964

Type species
- Ambohitsitondrona paradoxa Bechyné, 1964

Genus of leaf beetles from Madagascar

Ambohitsitondrona is a genus of leaf beetles in the subfamily Eumolpinae. It was described by the Czech entomologist Jan Bechyné in 1964. It contains three species, all of which are found in Madagascar. It is related to the genus Sahantaha.

== Species ==
The genus Ambohitsitondrona includes three species:

- Ambohitsitondrona micheli Bechyné, 1964 – type locality: Ambohitsitondrona
- Ambohitsitondrona paradoxa Bechyné, 1964 – type locality: Andrangoloaka, 1600 m, west-southwest of Tananarive
- Ambohitsitondrona tenuepunctata Bechyné, 1964 – type locality: Ankarampotsy, Tantamala, 1000–1100 m
