= Deuteronoda =

Scientific classification
- Kingdom: Animalia
- Phylum: Arthropoda
- Clade: Pancrustacea
- Class: Insecta
- Order: Coleoptera
- Suborder: Polyphaga
- Infraorder: Cucujiformia
- Family: Chrysomelidae
- Subfamily: Eumolpinae
- Tribe: Eumolpini
- Genus: Deuteronoda; Bechyné, 1951

Type species
- Colaspis suturalis Lefèvre, 1878

Genus of leaf beetles from Central and South America

Deuteronoda is a genus of leaf beetles in the subfamily Eumolpinae. It is known from Central America and South America.

== Species ==
- Deuteronoda brunneovittata Bechyné, 1958 – Peru
- Deuteronoda clavipes (Bechyné, 1950)
  - Deuteronoda clavipes brasiliensis Bechyné, 1954 – Brazil, Paraguay, Argentina
  - Deuteronoda clavipes clavipes (Bechyné, 1950) – Argentina
  - Deuteronoda clavipes metallescens Bechyné, 1951 – Bolivia
- Deuteronoda foveolata (Lefèvre, 1884) – Argentina
- Deuteronoda physipyga Bechyné, 1953 – Brazil
- Deuteronoda racenisi Bechyné, 1958 – Venezuela
- Deuteronoda suturalis (Lefèvre, 1878)
  - Deuteronoda suturalis borbensis Bechyné, 1951 – Brazil
  - Deuteronoda suturalis carmellita Bechyné, 1951 – Bolivia, Brazil
  - Deuteronoda suturalis suturalis (Lefèvre, 1878) – Colombia, Panama, Costa Rica, Nicaragua, Mexico
