= Ambodiriana pimelioides =

Scientific classification
- Kingdom: Animalia
- Phylum: Arthropoda
- Clade: Pancrustacea
- Class: Insecta
- Order: Coleoptera
- Suborder: Polyphaga
- Infraorder: Cucujiformia
- Family: Chrysomelidae
- Subfamily: Eumolpinae
- Tribe: Typophorini
- Genus: Ambodiriana; Bechyné, 1953
- Species: A. pimelioides

Binomial name
- Ambodiriana pimelioides Bechyné, 1953

Species of leaf beetle from Madagascar

Ambodiriana pimelioides is a species of leaf beetle endemic to Madagascar. It is the only member of the genus Ambodiriana, and belongs to the subfamily Eumolpinae, tribe Typophorini. It was first described by the Czech entomologist Jan Bechyné in 1953, from specimens collected from Tamatave. It is apterous, and its general appearance resembles that of the darkling beetle genus Pimelia.
