= Jansonius =

Scientific classification
- Kingdom: Animalia
- Phylum: Arthropoda
- Clade: Pancrustacea
- Class: Insecta
- Order: Coleoptera
- Suborder: Polyphaga
- Infraorder: Cucujiformia
- Family: Chrysomelidae
- Subfamily: Eumolpinae
- Tribe: Typophorini
- Genus: Jansonius; Baly, 1878

Type species
- Jansonius alternatus (= Haltica aenea Blanchard, 1851) Baly, 1878

Synonyms
- Halticops Brèthes, 1928; Paraulacia Brèthes, 1928

Genus of leaf beetles

Jansonius is a genus of leaf beetles in the subfamily Eumolpinae. It is found in Chile and Argentina. It was formerly placed in the tribe Adoxini, section Myochroites, but is now placed in Nodinini, section Metachromites.

== Species ==
The genus contains at least one valid species:

- Jansonius aeneus (Blanchard, 1851) (Synonyms: Eumolpus? valdivianus Philippi & Philippi, 1864; Chaetocnema blanchardi Baly, 1877; Jansonius alternatus Baly, 1878)

Dia patagonica Boheman, 1858, also from Chile, was placed in the genus by Jan Bechyné in 1953, but as the type is apparently lost or destroyed, this species is considered incertae sedis in Eumolpinae by Askevold & LeSage (1990).

Several additional species were described in or assigned to the genus by Jan Bechyné from other countries in South America, though these may not belong to the genus according to Askevold & LeSage (1990):

- Jansonius boggianii (Jacoby, 1899) – Paraguay, Argentina
- Jansonius pubescens Bechyné, 1955 – Paraguay
- Jansonius scolytinus Bechyné & Bechyné, 1961 – Brazil
- Jansonius vigiensis Bechyné & Bechyné, 1961 – Brazil
