= Brachypterodina =

Scientific classification
- Kingdom: Animalia
- Phylum: Arthropoda
- Clade: Pancrustacea
- Class: Insecta
- Order: Coleoptera
- Suborder: Polyphaga
- Infraorder: Cucujiformia
- Family: Chrysomelidae
- Subfamily: Eumolpinae
- Genus: Brachypterodina; Flowers, 2004

Type species
- Brachypterodina morae Flowers, 2004

Genus of leaf beetles from Costa Rica

Brachypterodina is a genus of leaf beetles in the subfamily Eumolpinae. It is found in Costa Rica. The generic name is said to be derived from the Greek brachy (meaning "short") and ptero (meaning "wing"), referring to the reduced or absent hind wings of species in the genus. The proper word for "wing" in ancient Greek is however pteron (πτερόν). It is similar in appearance to Apterodina.

== Species ==
- Brachypterodina gonzalezi Flowers, 2004
- Brachypterodina morae Flowers, 2004
