= Atomyria =

Scientific classification
- Kingdom: Animalia
- Phylum: Arthropoda
- Clade: Pancrustacea
- Class: Insecta
- Order: Coleoptera
- Suborder: Polyphaga
- Infraorder: Cucujiformia
- Family: Chrysomelidae
- Subfamily: Eumolpinae
- Tribe: Typophorini
- Genus: Atomyria; Jacobson, 1894

Type species
- Nodostoma sarafschanica Solsky, 1881

Genus of leaf beetles

Atomyria is a genus of leaf beetles in the subfamily Eumolpinae. It is distributed in Central Asia and Iran. In 2012, the genus was moved from the tribe Bromiini to the tribe Nodinini (now known as Typophorini). In 2020, the genus was revised by A. G. Moseyko, who described a new species and transferred two species to Chloropterus, leaving only two valid species remaining within Atomyria.

Members of the genus inhabit tugai forests. The known distribution of Atomyria also corresponds very closely with the distribution of the desert shrub genus Tamarix.

== Species ==
Atomyria includes only two valid species:

- Atomyria kermanshahica Moseyko, 2020 – Iran (Kermanshah Province)
- Atomyria sarafschanica (Solsky, 1881) – Kazakhstan, Kyrgyzstan, Tajikistan, Turkmenistan, Uzbekistan

The following species were formerly included, but have since been transferred to the genus Chloropterus.

- Atomyria mateui Selman, 1969 – Algeria
- Atomyria persica (Baly, 1878) – Iran
