= Bathseba (beetle) =

Scientific classification
- Kingdom: Animalia
- Phylum: Arthropoda
- Clade: Pancrustacea
- Class: Insecta
- Order: Coleoptera
- Suborder: Polyphaga
- Infraorder: Cucujiformia
- Family: Chrysomelidae
- Subfamily: Eumolpinae
- Tribe: Typophorini
- Genus: Bathseba; Motschulsky, 1866

Type species
- Bathseba ferruginosa Motschulsky, 1866

Synonyms
- Tricliona Lefèvre, 1885

Genus of leaf beetles

Bathseba (formerly Tricliona) is a genus of leaf beetles in the subfamily Eumolpinae. It contains at least 43 species, and is distributed from India and Southern China to the Philippines.

In 2023, Tricliona was proposed as a synonym of Bathseba Motschulsky, 1866, while Tricliona foveipennis Bryant, 1950 (the only species described from New Guinea), was transferred to the genus Gressittella.

== Species ==
The following species are placed in the genus:

- Bathseba armata (Jacoby, 1889) – Sumatra
- Bathseba bakeri (Moseyko, 2011) – Palawan
- Bathseba bicolor (Jacoby, 1895) – south India
- Bathseba bifasciata (Jacoby, 1895) – India, Nepal, Bhutan
- Bathseba ceylonensis (Jacoby, 1908) – Sri Lanka
- Bathseba consobrina (Chen, 1935) – North Vietnam
- Bathseba costipennis (Chen, 1935) – North Vietnam
- Bathseba episternalis (Weise, 1922) – Palawan
- Bathseba fasciata (Lefèvre, 1885) – Sumatra
- Bathseba ferruginea (Weise, 1922) – Palawan
- Bathseba ferruginosa Motschulsky, 1866 – Sri Lanka
- Bathseba fulvifrons (Jacoby, 1899) – Sumatra
- Bathseba kashmirica Deviatkina & Moseyko, 2024 – Jammu and Kashmir
- Bathseba inconspicua (Jacoby, 1908) – south India
- Bathseba indica (Jacoby, 1900) – India (West Bengal)
- Bathseba laevicollis (Jacoby, 1887) – Sri Lanka
- Bathseba lakshmi (Takizawa, 1984) – south India
- Bathseba laotica (Medvedev, 2000) – Laos
- Bathseba longicornis (Jacoby, 1908) – Sri Lanka
- Bathseba marginata (Jacoby, 1908) – south India
- Bathseba melanura (Lefèvre, 1890) – Cambodia, Laos, Vietnam, Thailand
- Bathseba microdentata (Medvedev & Sprecher-Uebersax, 1999) – Nepal
- Bathseba minuta (Medvedev, 2000) – Laos
- Bathseba nepalica Deviatkina & Moseyko, 2024 – Nepal
- Bathseba nigra (Jacoby, 1908) – south India
- Bathseba nigrofasciata (Jacoby, 1896) – Sumatra
- Bathseba nigromaculata (Lefèvre, 1885) – Sumatra
- Bathseba oculata (Medvedev & Takizawa, 2011) – Bali
- Bathseba paksensis (Kimoto & Gressitt, 1982) – Laos, Vietnam
- Bathseba philippina (Moseyko, 2011) – Mindanao
- Bathseba picea (Jacoby, 1895) – south India
- Bathseba puncticeps (Duvivier, 1891) – India, Nepal
- Bathseba quinquemaculata (Jacoby, 1887) – Sri Lanka
- Bathseba raapi (Jacoby, 1889) – Nias
- Bathseba sandakana (Moseyko, 2011) – Borneo
- Bathseba semivittata (Baly, 1864) – south India
- Bathseba suratthanica (Romantsov & Moseyko, 2016) – Thailand
- Bathseba suturalis (Kimoto & Gressitt, 1982) – Thailand
- Bathseba syzygium Kumari, Moseyko & Prathapan, 2023 – India (Kerala)
- Bathseba tonkinensis (Lefèvre, 1893) – North Vietnam
- Bathseba trangica (Romantsov & Moseyko, 2016) – Thailand
- Bathseba trimaculata (Romantsov & Moseyko, 2016) – Peninsular Malaysia
- Bathseba tristis (Medvedev, 2001) – Thailand
- Bathseba variabilis (Jacoby, 1895) – south India
- Bathseba variegata (Jacoby, 1904) – south India

Synonyms:

- Tricliona bengalensis (Jacoby, 1908): synonym of Bathseba indica (Jacoby, 1900)
- Tricliona apicata Jacoby, 1895: synonym of Bathseba puncticeps (Duvivier, 1891)
- Tricliona foveipennis Bryant, 1950: moved to Gressittella
- Tricliona glabricollis Jacoby, 1908 (replacement name for Tricliona laevicollis Jacoby, 1900): synonym of Colaspoides sublaevicollis Duvivier, 1892
- Tricliona laevicollis Jacoby, 1900 (preoccupied name): synonym of Colaspoides sublaevicollis Duvivier, 1892
- Tricliona oblonga (Motschulsky, 1866): moved to Basilepta
- Tricliona subdepressa Jacoby, 1908: synonym of Bathseba variegata (Jacoby, 1904)
- Tricliona sulcatipennis Jacoby, 1896: moved to Rhyparida
- Tricliona sulcipennis Jacoby, 1904: moved to Rhyparida
