= Sedlacekia =

Scientific classification
- Kingdom: Animalia
- Phylum: Arthropoda
- Clade: Pancrustacea
- Class: Insecta
- Order: Coleoptera
- Suborder: Polyphaga
- Infraorder: Cucujiformia
- Family: Chrysomelidae
- Subfamily: Eumolpinae
- Tribe: Typophorini
- Genus: Sedlacekia; Gressitt, 1969
- Species: S. pandani

Binomial name
- Sedlacekia pandani Gressitt, 1969

Genus of leaf beetles from New Guinea

Sedlacekia is a genus of leaf beetles in the subfamily Eumolpinae, distributed in New Guinea. It contains only one species, Sedlacekia pandani, which was described from several specimens collected from the Southern Highlands and Enga provinces in Papua New Guinea. It resembles the genus Pseudolpus, but differs from it by being less globose, having very small eyes, a transversely oblong prothorax, and strongly ridged elytra that are strongly narrowed towards the back and subvertical at the sides. The genus is named after Josef and Marie Sedlacek, who collected part of the type material.
