= Cheiridea =

Scientific classification
- Kingdom: Animalia
- Phylum: Arthropoda
- Clade: Pancrustacea
- Class: Insecta
- Order: Coleoptera
- Suborder: Polyphaga
- Infraorder: Cucujiformia
- Family: Chrysomelidae
- Subfamily: Eumolpinae
- Tribe: Typophorini
- Genus: Cheiridea; Baly, 1878
- Species: C. chapuisi

Binomial name
- Cheiridea chapuisi Baly, 1878

Synonyms
- Genus: Chiridea; Species: Chiridea chapuisi

Genus of leaf beetles from Africa

Cheiridea is a genus of leaf beetles in the subfamily Eumolpinae. It contains only one species, Cheiridea chapuisi, found in Sierra Leone. It was first described by Joseph Sugar Baly in 1878.

"Chiridea" is an alternative spelling of the genus name sometimes used; it is a Latinized version of the name "Cheiridea" created by Kuntzen in 1912, who considered the original name to be not Latinized.
