= Parascela =

Scientific classification
- Kingdom: Animalia
- Phylum: Arthropoda
- Clade: Pancrustacea
- Class: Insecta
- Order: Coleoptera
- Suborder: Polyphaga
- Infraorder: Cucujiformia
- Family: Chrysomelidae
- Subfamily: Eumolpinae
- Tribe: Typophorini
- Genus: Parascela; Baly, 1878

Type species
- Pseudocolaspis cribrata Schaufuss, 1871

Synonyms
- Pseudoparascela Pic, 1935

Genus of leaf beetles from Asia

Parascela is a genus of leaf beetles in the subfamily Eumolpinae. It is distributed in South, East and Southeast Asia. The genus was originally placed in the tribe Adoxini, but is now placed close to Basilepta in the tribe Typophorini. Parascela differs from Basilepta by having a densely punctured pronotum with weak lateral carinae, and elytra that are covered with setae or rugose, though Parascela can probably even be considered a species group within Basilepta.

== Species ==
- Parascela cribrata (Schaufuss, 1871) – Vietnam, China (Fujian, Guangdong, Hong Kong, Jiangxi, Sichuan, Yunnan, Zhejiang), Taiwan, Ryukyu Islands (Iriomote)
- Parascela filimonovi Romantsov & Moseyko, 2019 – Northern Vietnam, Southern China (Yunnan)
- Parascela hirsuta (Jacoby, 1908) – Northeast India (Assam), Southern China (Yunnan)
- Parascela rugipennis (Tan, 1988) – Southern China (Yunnan)
- Parascela tuberosa (Jacoby, 1887) – Sri Lanka

Synonyms:

- Parascela tuberosa Tan & Wang, 1983 (preoccupied by P. tuberosa (Jacoby, 1887)): synonym of Parascela rugipennis (Tan, 1988)
