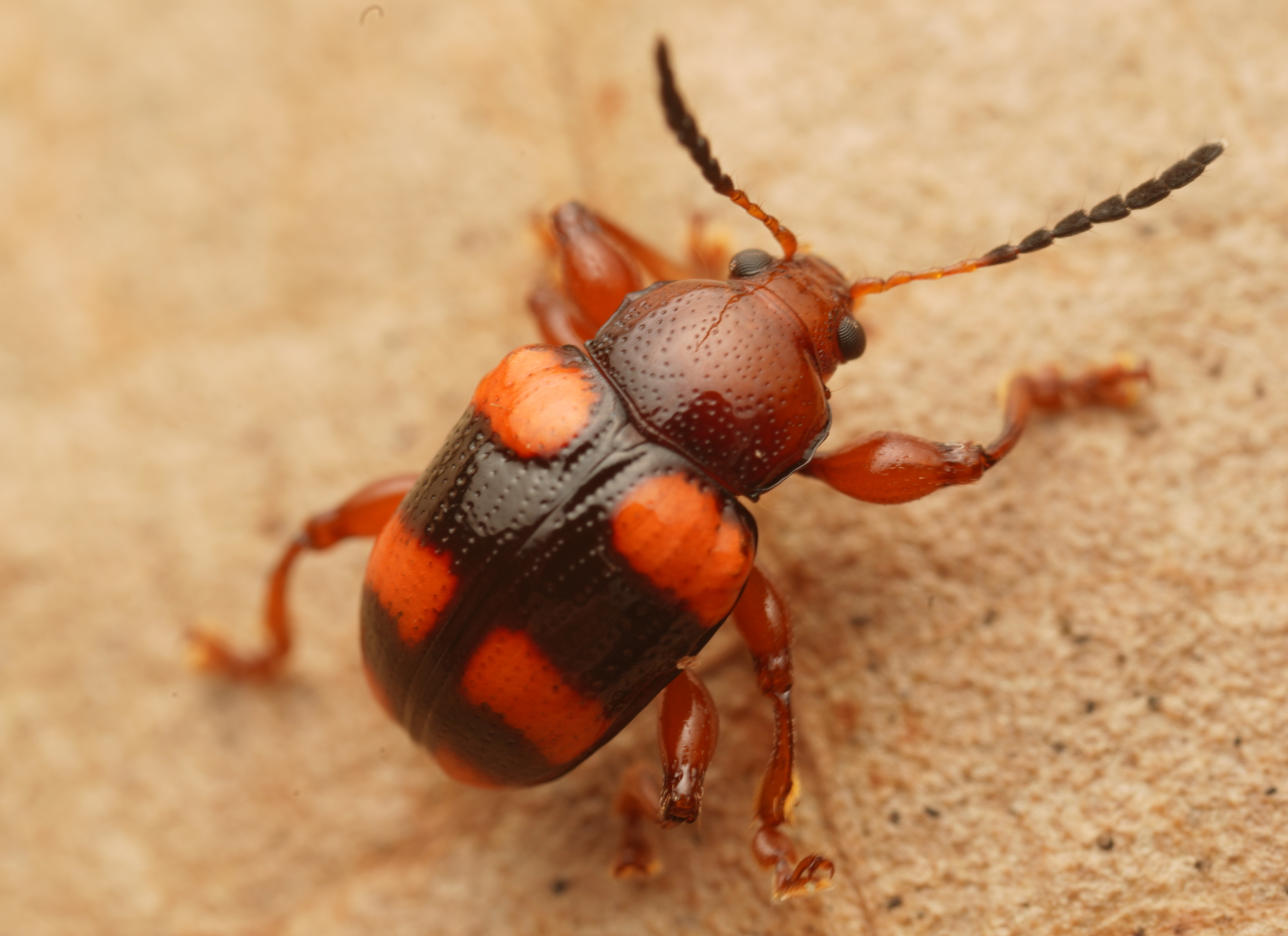
- Callisina fasciata, Singapore

Scientific classification
- Kingdom: Animalia
- Phylum: Arthropoda
- Clade: Pancrustacea
- Class: Insecta
- Order: Coleoptera
- Suborder: Polyphaga
- Infraorder: Cucujiformia
- Family: Chrysomelidae
- Subfamily: Eumolpinae
- Tribe: Typophorini
- Genus: Callisina; Baly, 1860

Type species
- Callisina fasciata Baly, 1860

= Callisina =

Genus of leaf beetles

Callisina is a genus of leaf beetles in the subfamily Eumolpinae. It is distributed in South, East and Southeast Asia.

== Species ==
- Callisina assamensis Jacoby, 1908 – India (Assam)
- Callisina balyi Jacoby, 1895 – Southern India (Belgaum, Kanara)
- Callisina brunnea Jacoby, 1908 – India (Sikkim, Darjeeling District)
- Callisina burmanica Jacoby, 1895 – Myanmar
- Callisina fasicata Baly, 1860
  - Callisina fasciata baliana Medvedev & Takizawa, 2011 – Bali
  - Callisina fasciata fasciata Baly, 1860 – Thailand, Peninsular Malaysia, Borneo
  - Callisina fasciata javana Medvedev & Takizawa, 2011 – Java
- Callisina fulva Medvedev, 2004 – Laos
- Callisina integricollis Jacoby, 1884 – Sumatra
- Callisina prominula Jacoby, 1908, Southern India (Belgaum)
- Callisina quadripustulata Baly, 1864 – Southwest China (Yunnan), India, Thailand, Laos, Cambodia, Vietnam, Java
- Callisina rufa Tan, 1992 – Southern China (Hong Kong, Macau, Yunnan)
- Callisina rufipes Pic, 1928 – Southwest China (Yunnan)
- Callisina trigibbosa Pic, 1928 – Vietnam

Synonyms:

- Callisina indica Baly, 1881: synonym of Cleoporus quadripustulatus (Baly, 1859)
