= Trypocolaspis =

Scientific classification
- Kingdom: Animalia
- Phylum: Arthropoda
- Clade: Pancrustacea
- Class: Insecta
- Order: Coleoptera
- Suborder: Polyphaga
- Infraorder: Cucujiformia
- Family: Chrysomelidae
- Subfamily: Eumolpinae
- Tribe: Typophorini
- Genus: Trypocolaspis; Lea, 1915

Type species
- Trypocolaspis biimpressa Lea, 1915

Genus of leaf beetles

Trypocolaspis is a genus of Australian leaf beetles in the subfamily Eumolpinae first described by Arthur Mills Lea in 1915.

== Species ==
Species include:

- Trypocolaspis biimpressa Lea, 1915 – Queensland (Cairns Region)
- Trypocolaspis multicarinata Lea, 1915 – Queensland (Mount Tamborine), New South Wales (Dorrigo, Coramba, Blue Mountains)
- Trypocolaspis multiseriata Lea, 1915 – Queensland (Coen River)
- Trypocolaspis obscuripes Lea, 1915 – Queensland (Cairns Region)
- Trypocolaspis punctatostriata Lea, 1915 – Queensland (Cairns Region, Mossman River, Kuranda)
- Trypocolaspis sinuata Lea, 1915 – Queensland (Cairns Region)
- Trypocolaspis ventralis Lea, 1915 – Queensland (Coen River)
