= Iviva =

Scientific classification
- Kingdom: Animalia
- Phylum: Arthropoda
- Clade: Pancrustacea
- Class: Insecta
- Order: Coleoptera
- Suborder: Polyphaga
- Infraorder: Cucujiformia
- Family: Chrysomelidae
- Subfamily: Eumolpinae
- Tribe: Typophorini
- Genus: Iviva; Gressitt, 1969

Type species
- Iviva coccinelloides Gressitt, 1969

Genus of leaf beetles

Iviva is a genus of leaf beetles in the subfamily Eumolpinae, distributed in New Guinea. It differs from most genera in the subfamily by its elytra, the sides of which are strongly expanded sideways and extend far beyond the elytral margins except near the apex. Because of the shape and the rigid appearance of the elytra as well as their reduced humeri (shoulders of elytra), it is likely flightless. The genus is named after the type locality of the type species, Lake Iviva (Sirunki), in the Enga province of Papua New Guinea.

== Species ==
- Iviva antennata Medvedev, 2009 – Papua New Guinea (Morobe)
- Iviva coccinelloides Gressitt, 1969 – Papua New Guinea (Enga, South Highlands)
- Iviva diversipunctata Medvedev, 2009 – Western New Guinea: Highland Papua (Jayawijaya)
- Iviva striata Medvedev, 2009 – Western New Guinea: Highland Papua (Jayawijaya)
