= Cleoparida =

Scientific classification
- Kingdom: Animalia
- Phylum: Arthropoda
- Clade: Pancrustacea
- Class: Insecta
- Order: Coleoptera
- Suborder: Polyphaga
- Infraorder: Cucujiformia
- Family: Chrysomelidae
- Subfamily: Eumolpinae
- Tribe: Typophorini
- Genus: Cleoparida; Gressitt, 1967

Type species
- Cleoporus ribbei Jacoby, 1898

Genus of leaf beetles from Solomon Islands

Cleoparida is a genus of leaf beetles in the subfamily Eumolpinae. It is distributed in the Solomon Islands.

== Species ==
- Cleoparida freycinetiae Gressitt, 1967 – New Georgia Islands (Rendova)
- Cleoparida obrieni Gressitt, 1967 – Santa Isabel, Bougainville
- Cleoparida ribbei (Jacoby, 1898) – Bougainville, Treasury Islands, Shortland Islands
- Cleoparida salomonensis (Bryant, 1937) – Guadalcanal, Bougainville
- Cleoparida speciosa Gressitt, 1967 – Bougainville
