= Apterodina =

Scientific classification
- Kingdom: Animalia
- Phylum: Arthropoda
- Clade: Pancrustacea
- Class: Insecta
- Order: Coleoptera
- Suborder: Polyphaga
- Infraorder: Cucujiformia
- Family: Chrysomelidae
- Subfamily: Eumolpinae
- Tribe: Eumolpini
- Genus: Apterodina; Bechyné, 1954

Type species
- Apterodina bucki Bechyné, 1954

Genus of leaf beetles from South America

Apterodina is a genus of leaf beetles in the subfamily Eumolpinae. It is known from Brazil, Colombia and Ecuador. It was first described by the Czech entomologist, Jan Bechyné in 1954. All species of the genus have greatly reduced hind wings.

== Species ==
- Apterodina achuparia Flowers, 2009 – Ecuador
- Apterodina bechynei Flowers, 2004 – Colombia
- Apterodina bucki Bechyné, 1954 – southeast Brazil
- Apterodina granulifera Bechyné & Bechyné, 1964 – southeast Brazil
- Apterodina ruminyahui Flowers, 2004 – Ecuador
