= Gressittana =

Scientific classification
- Kingdom: Animalia
- Phylum: Arthropoda
- Clade: Pancrustacea
- Class: Insecta
- Order: Coleoptera
- Suborder: Polyphaga
- Infraorder: Cucujiformia
- Family: Chrysomelidae
- Subfamily: Eumolpinae
- Tribe: Typophorini
- Genus: Gressittana; Medvedev, 2009
- Species: G. sculpturata

Binomial name
- Gressittana sculpturata (Gressitt, 1967)

Synonyms
- Rhyparida sculpturata Gressitt, 1967

Genus of leaf beetles endemic to New Guinea

Gressittana is a genus of leaf beetles in the subfamily Eumolpinae. It contains only one species, Gressittana sculpturata, which was originally placed in Rhyparida. The genus is endemic to New Guinea, and is named after Judson Linsley Gressitt.
