= Deretrichia =

Scientific classification
- Kingdom: Animalia
- Phylum: Arthropoda
- Clade: Pancrustacea
- Class: Insecta
- Order: Coleoptera
- Suborder: Polyphaga
- Infraorder: Cucujiformia
- Family: Chrysomelidae
- Subfamily: Eumolpinae
- Tribe: Typophorini
- Genus: Deretrichia; Weise, 1913

Type species
- Rhyparida tibialis Baly, 1867

Genus of leaf beetles

Deretrichia is a genus of leaf beetles in the subfamily Eumolpinae. It is known from Australia, New Guinea and associated islands in the Australasian realm, east of Wallace's Line, with the exception of one doubtful record from Borneo. It was first erected by the German entomologist Julius Weise in 1913 for six species transferred from Rhyparida. In 1963, the genus was revised by Brian J. Selman, who described many new species from unique specimens and transferred some more species from Rhyparida.

The described species are considered to be rare, and some are possibly already extinct. In almost every location that Deretrichia has been found, very few specimens were collected, and they were rarely collected again in the same locations, possibly because of deforestation in those areas. Selman (1963) wrote that "recently Deretrichia specimens have been collected only in regions, e.g. New Guinea, where large areas of the coastal forest belt had survived".

Deretrichia can be distinguished from Rhyparida by the location of setae on the front of the prothorax. In Rhyparida, a single seta is found on each front corner of the pronotum. In Deretrichia, these setae are instead found lower down on the sides of the prothorax, at the point where the corners of the episternum and the lateral arms of the prosternum meet.

== Species ==
- Deretrichia alternata (Baly, 1864) – Bacan, Halmahera
- Deretrichia amboinensis Selman, 1963 – Ambon
- Deretrichia andannensis (Jacoby, 1894) (andaiensis?) – Western New Guinea (Andai, Manokwari)
- Deretrichia approximata (Baly, 1867) – Misool
- Deretrichia australis Selman, 1963 – Australia: Queensland (Cairns)
- Deretrichia batchianica Selman, 1963 – Bacan
- Deretrichia bipustulata (Baly, 1867) – Waigeo
- Deretrichia brunnea (Baly, 1867) – Bacan
- Deretrichia bryanti Selman, 1963 – Halmahera
- Deretrichia cyclopensis Selman, 1963 – Western New Guinea (Cyclops Mountains)
- Deretrichia doryensis Selman, 1963 – Western New Guinea (Manokwari)
- Deretrichia flebilis Selman, 1963 – Ternate
- Deretrichia frontalis (Baly, 1867) – Western New Guinea (Manokwari)
- Deretrichia giloloensis Selman, 1963 – Halmahera
- Deretrichia guadalcanalensis Selman, 1963 – Solomon Islands (Guadalcanal)
- Deretrichia hincksi Selman, 1963 – Western New Guinea (Manokwari)
- Deretrichia inornata (Jacoby, 1894) – Tanimbar
- Deretrichia intermedia (Baly, 1867) – Waigeo
- Deretrichia laevifrons (Jacoby, 1884) – Western New Guinea (Sorong)
- Deretrichia laticollis (Baly, 1867) – Borneo (doubtful)
- Deretrichia livida Selman, 1963 – Western New Guinea (Cyclops Mountains)
- Deretrichia minuta Selman, 1963 – Tasmania
- Deretrichia morokensis Selman, 1963 – Papua New Guinea (Moroka)
- Deretrichia nigra Selman, 1963 – Halmahera
- Deretrichia nigronotata Selman, 1963 – New Guinea ("Munika Bay")
- Deretrichia pallidocaudata Selman, 1963 – Seram
- Deretrichia papuensis Selman, 1963 – Papua New Guinea (Mafulu)
- Deretrichia paumomuensis Selman, 1963 – Papua New Guinea (Angabanga River)
- Deretrichia pinguis Selman, 1963 – Papua New Guinea (Mafulu)
- Deretrichia plebeja (Jacoby, 1894) – Western New Guinea (Yos Sudarso Bay, Cyclops Mountains)
- Deretrichia rothschildi (Jacoby, 1894) – Halmahera
- Deretrichia ruginotum Selman, 1963 – Bacan, Halmahera
- Deretrichia semipunctata (Baly, 1867) – Bacan
- Deretrichia separata (Baly, 1867) – Bacan
- Deretrichia sordida (Baly, 1864) – Bacan, Ternate
- Deretrichia sulcicollis (Baly, 1867) – Sula Islands
- Deretrichia szentivani Selman, 1963 – New Britain, Feni Islands
- Deretrichia tibialis (Baly, 1867) – Misool
- Deretrichia tibialis Medvedev, 2013 (homonym?) – Western New Guinea (Kaimana)
- Deretrichia timorensis (Jacoby, 1894) – Timor
- Deretrichia variabilis (Baly, 1867) – Western New Guinea (Manokwari)
- Deretrichia viridis Selman, 1963 – Papua New Guinea (Mafulu)
- Deretrichia wallacei Selman, 1963 – Misool
