= Nakanaia =

Scientific classification
- Kingdom: Animalia
- Phylum: Arthropoda
- Clade: Pancrustacea
- Class: Insecta
- Order: Coleoptera
- Suborder: Polyphaga
- Infraorder: Cucujiformia
- Family: Chrysomelidae
- Subfamily: Eumolpinae
- Tribe: Typophorini
- Genus: Nakanaia; Gressitt, 1969
- Species: N. depressicollis

Binomial name
- Nakanaia depressicollis Gressitt, 1969

Genus of leaf beetles from New Guinea

Nakanaia is a genus of leaf beetles in the subfamily Eumolpinae. It contains only one species, Nakanaia depressicollis. It was described from a single female specimen collected from Gisiluve, a locality in the Nakanai Mountains in east central New Britain. It resembles the genera Rhyparida and Rhyparidella, but differs from the former by its lack of a "Y"-shaped suture on the frontoclypeus (a combined frons and clypeus, making up part of the face), and from the latter by its pronotum being traversely depressed in the middle, and lacking a tooth on the underside of each femur of the legs. The genus is named after the type locality of the type species, the Nakanai Mountains.
