= Medvedemolpus =

Scientific classification
- Kingdom: Animalia
- Phylum: Arthropoda
- Clade: Pancrustacea
- Class: Insecta
- Order: Coleoptera
- Suborder: Polyphaga
- Infraorder: Cucujiformia
- Family: Chrysomelidae
- Subfamily: Eumolpinae
- Tribe: Typophorini
- Genus: Medvedemolpus; Moseyko, 2010

Type species
- Medvedemolpus bakeri Moseyko, 2010

Genus of leaf beetles from the Philippines

Medvedemolpus is a genus of leaf beetles in the subfamily Eumolpinae, known from the Philippines. It is named after the Chrysomelidae specialist Dr. Lev N. Medvedev, who had turned 75 at the time the genus was first described; the name is a combination of parts of both his surname and the name Eumolpus, indicating the subfamily placement of the genus.

== Species ==
- Medvedemolpus bakeri Moseyko, 2010 – Mindanao (Surigao del Norte)
- Medvedemolpus basilianus Moseyko, 2010 – Basilan
- Medvedemolpus quadripunctatus Moseyko, 2010 – Luzon
- Medvedemolpus quinquepunctatus Moseyko, 2010 – Mindanao (South Cotabato, Zamboanga del Sur)
