= Chrysonopa =

Scientific classification
- Kingdom: Animalia
- Phylum: Arthropoda
- Clade: Pancrustacea
- Class: Insecta
- Order: Coleoptera
- Suborder: Polyphaga
- Infraorder: Cucujiformia
- Family: Chrysomelidae
- Subfamily: Eumolpinae
- Tribe: Typophorini
- Genus: Chrysonopa; Jacoby, 1908

Type species
- Chrysonopa viridis Jacoby, 1908

Genus of leaf beetles from Asia and New Guinea

Chrysonopa is a genus of leaf beetles in the subfamily Eumolpinae. It is distributed in South, East and Southeast Asia and New Guinea.

== Species ==
The following species are placed in the genus:

- Chrysonopa apicalis Takizawa, 1989 – India (Sikkim)
- Chrysonopa brunnea Jacoby, 1908 – Southern India
- Chrysonopa longipes (Jacoby, 1894) – Myanmar
- Chrysonopa metallica Bryant, 1950 – New Guinea
- Chrysonopa nigroscutella Tan, 1988 – China (Xizang)
- Chrysonopa rotundicollis (Jacoby, 1900) – India (Khasi Hills)
- Chrysonopa tibetana Gressitt & Kimoto, 1961 – China (Xizang)
- Chrysonopa viridis Jacoby, 1908 – Southern India
