= Aphilenia =

Scientific classification
- Kingdom: Animalia
- Phylum: Arthropoda
- Clade: Pancrustacea
- Class: Insecta
- Order: Coleoptera
- Suborder: Polyphaga
- Infraorder: Cucujiformia
- Family: Chrysomelidae
- Subfamily: Eumolpinae
- Tribe: Typophorini
- Genus: Aphilenia; Weise in Reitter, 1889

Type species
- Aphilenia interrupta Weise in Reitter, 1889

Genus of leaf beetles from Asia

Aphilenia is a genus of leaf beetles in the subfamily Eumolpinae. It is distributed in Central and East Asia as well as southern Russia. Members of the genus are adapted to dry climates, and feed on bushes of the genus Calligonum. In 2012, the genus was moved from the tribe Bromiini to the tribe Nodinini (now known as Typophorini).

== Species ==
- Subgenus Aphilenia Weise in Reitter, 1889 (type species: Aphilenia interrupta Weise in Reitter, 1889)
  - Aphilenia astakhovi Moseyko, 2012 – Russia: Astrakhan Oblast
  - Aphilenia gobica Lopatin, 1970 (formerly a subspecies of A. interrupta) – Mongolia, China: Inner Mongolia
  - Aphilenia interrupta Weise in Reitter, 1889 – Turkmenistan, Uzbekistan, Tajikistan, Kazakhstan, Turkey
  - Aphilenia ornata Reitter, 1889 – Kazakhstan, Uzbekistan, Turkmenistan
  - Aphilenia parvula Weise in Hauser, 1894 – Turkmenistan, Uzbekistan
- Subgenus Pseudaphilenia Lopatin, 1976 (type species: Aphilenia hauseri Weise in Hauser, 1894)
  - Aphilenia lopatini Moseyko, 2013 – Kazakhstan
  - Aphilenia mujunkumica Moseyko, 2013 – Kazakhstan
  - Aphilenia unicolor Reitter, 1889 (formerly a variation of A. interrupta; synonym: A. hauseri Weise in Hauser, 1894) – Turkmenistan, Uzbekistan
