= Rhynchomolpus =

Scientific classification
- Kingdom: Animalia
- Phylum: Arthropoda
- Clade: Pancrustacea
- Class: Insecta
- Order: Coleoptera
- Suborder: Polyphaga
- Infraorder: Cucujiformia
- Family: Chrysomelidae
- Subfamily: Eumolpinae
- Tribe: Typophorini
- Genus: Rhynchomolpus; Gressitt, 1969

Type species
- Rhynchomolpus curculionoides Gressitt, 1969

Genus of leaf beetles from New Guinea

Rhynchomolpus is a genus of leaf beetles in the subfamily Eumolpinae, distributed in New Guinea. It is not known to have any close relatives in the subfamily, having an unusual head and antennae: it has an elongated neck, and the antennae are short, stout and quite hairy. The name of the genus refers to its resemblance to a snout beetle.

== Species ==
- Rhynchomolpus curculionoides Gressitt, 1969 – Papua New Guinea (Eastern Highlands)
- Rhynchomolpus ptinoides Gressitt, 1969 – Papua New Guinea (Morobe)
