= Coniomma =

Scientific classification
- Kingdom: Animalia
- Phylum: Arthropoda
- Clade: Pancrustacea
- Class: Insecta
- Order: Coleoptera
- Suborder: Polyphaga
- Infraorder: Cucujiformia
- Family: Chrysomelidae
- Subfamily: Eumolpinae
- Tribe: Typophorini
- Genus: Coniomma; Weise, 1922
- Species: C. hospes

Binomial name
- Coniomma hospes Weise, 1922

Genus of leaf beetles from the Philippines

Coniomma is a genus of leaf beetles in the subfamily Eumolpinae. It contains only one species, Coniomma hospes, and is endemic to the island of Luzon in the Philippines. The genus and species were first described by Julius Weise in 1922, and were re-described in 2011 by A. G. Moseyko. The genus is very closely related to Rhyparida, from which it is separated mainly by the shape of the eyes and the length of the antennae.

== Description ==
Coniomma hospes has an elongate shining, glabrous, yellow-reddish body, with a black pattern on the elytra, antennae and legs. The pronotum is narrower than the elytra. The eyes are conical, and the antennae are very long, longer than the body. The claws are bifid. The body length is 3.4–4.1 mm in males, and 4.6–4.9 mm in females. The body width is 2.0–2.1 mm in males, and 2.3–2.4 mm in females.
