= Stygnobia =

Scientific classification
- Kingdom: Animalia
- Phylum: Arthropoda
- Clade: Pancrustacea
- Class: Insecta
- Order: Coleoptera
- Suborder: Polyphaga
- Infraorder: Cucujiformia
- Family: Chrysomelidae
- Subfamily: Eumolpinae
- Tribe: Typophorini
- Genus: Stygnobia; Weise, 1922

Type species
- Stygnobia cauta Weise, 1922

Genus of leaf beetles

Stygnobia is a genus of leaf beetles found in the Samoan Islands and Fiji. It is a member of the subfamily Eumolpinae.

== Species ==
The genus contains 13 species:

- Stygnobia aenescens Maulik, 1929 – Tutuila
- Stygnobia albiseta Gressitt, 1957 – Central Fiji
- Stygnobia cauta Weise, 1922 – Upolu, Tutuila, Savaiʻi, Manuʻa Islands (Taʻū)
- Stygnobia elliptica Gressitt, 1957 – Viti Levu
- Stygnobia evansi (Bryant, 1942) – Viti Levu, Ovalau, Taveuni
- Stygnobia leveri (Bryant, 1942) – Viti Levu, Ovalau, Vanua Levu, Taveuni
- Stygnobia metallica Bryant, 1946 – Ovalau, Viti Levu, Vanua Levu, Taveuni
- Stygnobia minuta Maulik, 1929 – Upolu, Tutuila
- Stygnobia nandarivatu Gressitt, 1957 – Viti Levu
- Stygnobia oconnori Gressitt, 1957 – Ovalau, Viti Levu, Vanua Levu, Lau
- Stygnobia ovalaua Gressitt, 1957 – Ovalau, Moala, Viti Levu
- Stygnobia variabilis Maulik, 1929 – Upolu, Tutuila, Savaiʻi
- Stygnobia vermiculicollis Gressitt, 1957 – Upolu
