= Stizomolpus =

Scientific classification
- Kingdom: Animalia
- Phylum: Arthropoda
- Clade: Pancrustacea
- Class: Insecta
- Order: Coleoptera
- Suborder: Polyphaga
- Infraorder: Cucujiformia
- Family: Chrysomelidae
- Subfamily: Eumolpinae
- Tribe: Typophorini
- Genus: Stizomolpus; Gressitt, 1969
- Species: S. kebarus

Binomial name
- Stizomolpus kebarus Gressitt, 1969

Genus of leaf beetles from New Guinea

Stizomolpus is a genus of leaf beetles in the subfamily Eumolpinae. It contains only one species, Stizomolpus kebarus. It was described from a single female specimen collected from Kebar Valley, a locality in the Indonesian province of Southwest Papua on the island of New Guinea. It resembles the genus Rhyparida, but differs from it by having a broad head, lacking a "Y"-shaped suture on the frontoclypeus (a combined frons and clypeus, making up part of the face) as well as lacking grooves above the eyes, having swollen and transversely grooved elytra with very unequal puncturation, and having a small tooth on the underside of each femur on the front and hind legs. The name of the genus refers to the strong punctures (of the pronotum and elytra) and "eumolpine beetle".
