= Meniellus =

Scientific classification
- Kingdom: Animalia
- Phylum: Arthropoda
- Clade: Pancrustacea
- Class: Insecta
- Order: Coleoptera
- Suborder: Polyphaga
- Infraorder: Cucujiformia
- Family: Chrysomelidae
- Subfamily: Eumolpinae
- Tribe: Typophorini
- Genus: Meniellus; Weise, 1903

Type species
- Meniellus kohlschuetteri Weise, 1903

Genus of leaf beetles from Africa

Meniellus is a genus of leaf beetles in the subfamily Eumolpinae. It is known from Africa.

== Species ==
- Meniellus kohlschuetteri Weise, 1903 – Tanzania, Zambia, Zimbabwe
- Meniellus maculicollis (Jacoby, 1897) – Angola, DR Congo, Ivory Coast, Nigeria, Rwanda, Sudan
