= Micromolpus =

Scientific classification
- Kingdom: Animalia
- Phylum: Arthropoda
- Clade: Pancrustacea
- Class: Insecta
- Order: Coleoptera
- Suborder: Polyphaga
- Infraorder: Cucujiformia
- Family: Chrysomelidae
- Subfamily: Eumolpinae
- Tribe: Typophorini
- Genus: Micromolpus; Gressitt, 1969

Type species
- Micromolpus dodonaeae Gressitt, 1969

Genus of leaf beetles

Micromolpus is a genus of leaf beetles in the subfamily Eumolpinae. It is distributed in New Guinea, New Ireland and questionably New Britain. It resembles the genus Rhyparida, but differs from it by being minute in size, lacking a "Y"-shaped suture on the frontoclypeus (a combined frons and clypeus, making up part of the face), having a constricted vertex (top of the head), and having a strongly convex pronotum, and being strongly punctured only along borders. The name of the genus refers to "a small eumolpine beetle".

== Species ==
- Micromolpus dodonaeae Gressitt, 1969 – Papua New Guinea (Eastern Highlands, Chimbu, Morobe, Jiwaka, Southern Highlands)
- Micromolpus pipturi Gressitt, 1969 – Western New Guinea: Highland Papua (Jayawijaya), Papua New Guinea (Southern Highlands, Eastern Highlands)
- Micromolpus submetallica Gressitt, 1969 – New Ireland, New Britain(?)
- Micromolpus triumfettae Gressitt, 1969 – Western New Guinea: Central Papua (Dogiyai), Papua New Guinea (Eastern Highlands, Jiwaka)
