= Agetinella =

Scientific classification
- Domain: Eukaryota
- Kingdom: Animalia
- Phylum: Arthropoda
- Class: Insecta
- Order: Coleoptera
- Suborder: Polyphaga
- Infraorder: Cucujiformia
- Family: Chrysomelidae
- Subfamily: Eumolpinae
- Tribe: incertae sedis
- Genus: Agetinella; Jacoby, 1908
- Species: A. minuta

Binomial name
- Agetinella minuta Jacoby, 1908

Genus of leaf beetles

Agetinella is a genus of leaf beetles in the subfamily Eumolpinae. It contains only one species, Agetinella minuta, which is known from Swan River in Western Australia. The genus and species were first described by the German entomologist Martin Jacoby, in an article posthumously published in 1908. The genus was originally assigned to the tribe Eumolpini, but later leaf beetle classifications instead place it as incertae sedis within Eumolpinae.

In a 1990 PhD thesis by Chris A.M. Reid, it was determined that Agetinella actually belonged to Cryptocephalinae, and is a synonym of Leasia. Because the dissertation is considered to be unpublished according to the International Code of Zoological Nomenclature, this nomenclatural act is not valid.
