= Keeta =

Scientific classification
- Kingdom: Animalia
- Phylum: Arthropoda
- Clade: Pancrustacea
- Class: Insecta
- Order: Coleoptera
- Suborder: Polyphaga
- Infraorder: Cucujiformia
- Family: Chrysomelidae
- Subfamily: Eumolpinae
- Tribe: Typophorini
- Genus: Keeta; Maulik, 1931

Type species
- Keeta aldabrana Maulik, 1931

Genus of leaf beetles from the Seychelles

Keeta is a genus of leaf beetles in the subfamily Eumolpinae. It contains two species endemic to the Aldabra atoll in the Seychelles. The genus and both species were described by the Indian entomologist Samarendra Maulik, from specimens collected by the Percy Sladen Trust Expedition to the Indian Ocean in 1908. The generic name comes from the Sanskrit word कीट (kīṭa), meaning "insect".

== Species ==
- Keeta aldabrana Maulik, 1931
- Keeta fryeri Maulik, 1931
