= Gaberella =

Scientific classification
- Kingdom: Animalia
- Phylum: Arthropoda
- Clade: Pancrustacea
- Class: Insecta
- Order: Coleoptera
- Suborder: Polyphaga
- Infraorder: Cucujiformia
- Family: Chrysomelidae
- Subfamily: Eumolpinae
- Tribe: Typophorini
- Genus: Gaberella; Selman, 1965
- Species: G. costata

Binomial name
- Gaberella costata (Baly, 1878)

Synonyms
- Menius costatus Baly, 1878; Rhembastus sjoestedti Jacoby, 1903

Genus of leaf beetles from Africa

Gaberella is a genus of leaf beetles in the subfamily Eumolpinae, found in Africa. It contains only one species, Gaberella costata, which was first described by Joseph Sugar Baly in 1878 and was originally placed in the genus Menius.

== Description ==
G. costata has a very rounded body, which is 3 millimetres (0.12 in) in length. The head is deeply inserted into the thorax, and both the head and prothorax are turned strongly downwards. The front legs of the males have a highly enlarged first tarsomere (segment of the tarsus).

== Distribution ==
G. costata is recorded from Bioko Island, Ivory Coast, Cameroon, Gabon, the Republic of the Congo, the Democratic Republic of Congo, South Sudan and Uganda.
