= Amblynetes =

Scientific classification
- Kingdom: Animalia
- Phylum: Arthropoda
- Clade: Pancrustacea
- Class: Insecta
- Order: Coleoptera
- Suborder: Polyphaga
- Infraorder: Cucujiformia
- Family: Chrysomelidae
- Subfamily: Eumolpinae
- Tribe: Typophorini
- Genus: Amblynetes; Weise, 1904
- Species: A. bottegoi

Binomial name
- Amblynetes bottegoi (Jacoby, 1899)

Synonyms
- Syagrus bottegoi Jacoby, 1899; Amblynetes morio Weise, 1904

Genus of leaf beetles from East Africa

Amblynetes is a genus of leaf beetles in the subfamily Eumolpinae. It contains only one species, Amblynetes bottegoi. It is known from East Africa.

The genus was first erected by the German entomologist Julius Weise in 1904 for the newly described species Amblynetes morio. This species was later found to be identical to Syagrus bottegoi, a species of Syagrus described by Martin Jacoby in 1899. Because Weise felt that S. bottegoi did not belong in Syagrus, this species was transferred to Amblynetes, and A. morio became a junior synonym of it.
