= Phytorellus =

Scientific classification
- Kingdom: Animalia
- Phylum: Arthropoda
- Clade: Pancrustacea
- Class: Insecta
- Order: Coleoptera
- Suborder: Polyphaga
- Infraorder: Cucujiformia
- Family: Chrysomelidae
- Subfamily: Eumolpinae
- Tribe: Typophorini
- Genus: Phytorellus; Medvedev & Moseyko, 2003

Type species
- Phytorus latus Weise, 1910

Genus of leaf beetles from the Philippines

Phytorellus is a genus of leaf beetles in the subfamily Eumolpinae, known from the Philippines.

== Species ==
- Phytorellus gibbosus (Lefèvre, 1885) – ?Luzon
- Phytorellus latus (Weise, 1910)
  - Phytorellus latus latus (Weise, 1910) – Romblon, Luzon
  - Phytorellus latus mindorensis Medvedev & Moseyko, 2003 – Mindoro
