= Gressittella (beetle) =

Scientific classification
- Kingdom: Animalia
- Phylum: Arthropoda
- Clade: Pancrustacea
- Class: Insecta
- Order: Coleoptera
- Suborder: Polyphaga
- Infraorder: Cucujiformia
- Family: Chrysomelidae
- Subfamily: Eumolpinae
- Tribe: Typophorini
- Genus: Gressittella; Medvedev, 2009

Type species
- Gressittella riedeli Medvedev, 2009

Genus of leaf beetles endemic to New Guinea

Gressittella is a genus of leaf beetles in the subfamily Eumolpinae. The genus is endemic to New Guinea, and is named after Judson Linsley Gressitt.

== Species ==
- Gressittella foveipennis (Bryant, 1950) – Papua New Guinea (Kokoda)
- Gressittella laevis Medvedev, 2009 – Western New Guinea: Highland Papua (Jayawijaya)
- Gressittella obscura Medvedev, 2009 – Papua New Guinea (Vanimo)
- Gressittella riedeli Medvedev, 2009 – Western New Guinea: Highland Papua (Jayawijaya)
