= Aulacia =

Scientific classification
- Kingdom: Animalia
- Phylum: Arthropoda
- Clade: Pancrustacea
- Class: Insecta
- Order: Coleoptera
- Suborder: Polyphaga
- Infraorder: Cucujiformia
- Family: Chrysomelidae
- Subfamily: Eumolpinae
- Tribe: Eumolpini
- Genus: Aulacia; Baly, 1867

Genus of leaf beetles from Asia

Aulacia is a genus of leaf beetles in the subfamily Eumolpinae. It is distributed in Malaysia, Indonesia and the Philippines. It is closely related to the genera Colaspoides and Aulacioides.

== Species ==
- Aulacia bicoloricollis (Medvedev & Romantsov, 2014) – Borneo (Sabah)
- Aulacia bipustulata Baly, 1867 – Borneo (Sabah, Sarawak)
- Aulacia brunnea Jacoby, 1894 – Malay Peninsula, Sumatra
- Aulacia cechovskyi Medvedev, 2016 – Malay Peninsula
- Aulacia cyaneipennis (Medvedev, 2010) – Borneo (Sabah)
- Aulacia diversa Baly, 1867 – Singapore, Malay Peninsula
- Aulacia femorata Baly, 1867 – Borneo (Sabah, Sarawak)
- Aulacia flavifrons Jacoby, 1896 – Sumatra
- Aulacia fulva Medvedev, 2004 – Malay Peninsula
- Aulacia fulviceps Baly, 1867 – Borneo (Sabah, Sarawak)
- Aulacia fulvicollis (Jacoby, 1899) – Sumatra
- Aulacia guskovae Romantsov, 2024 – Singapore
- Aulacia limbipennis Romantsov, 2024 – Borneo (Sabah)
- Aulacia longicostata Romantsov, 2024 – Borneo (Sabah)
- Aulacia minuta (Medvedev, 1995) – Philippines (Palawan)
- Aulacia montana Takizawa, 2017 – Borneo (Sabah)
- Aulacia moseykoi Romantsov, 2024 – Borneo (Sabah)
- Aulacia nigella (Weise, 1922) – Philippines (Luzon, Mindoro)
- Aulacia ornata Jacoby, 1896 – Sumatra
- Aulacia riedeli Medvedev, 2004 – Borneo (Sabah)

Species transferred to Aulacioides:

- Aulacia laeta Medvedev, 2004 – Malay Peninsula
