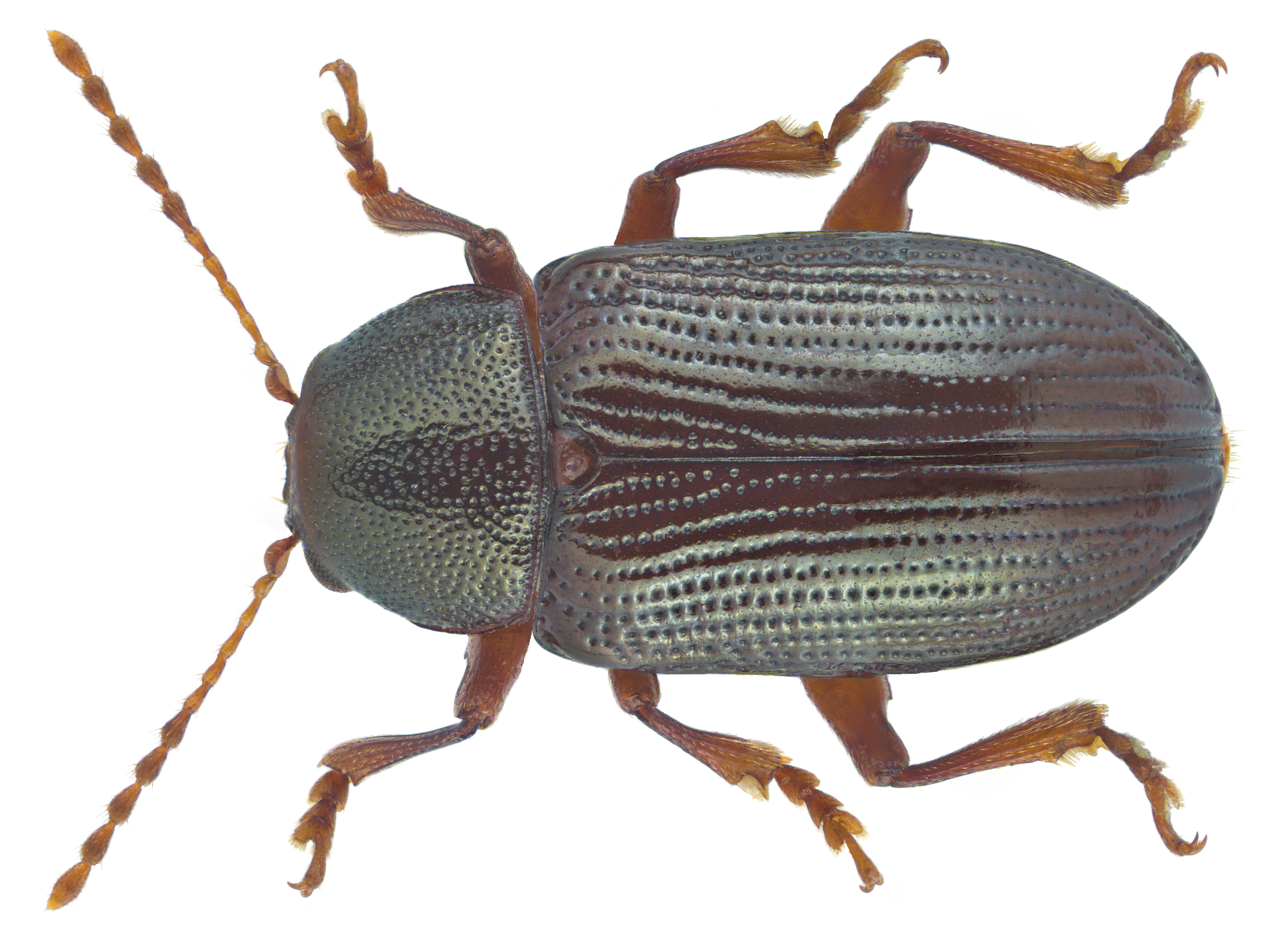

Scientific classification
- Kingdom: Animalia
- Phylum: Arthropoda
- Clade: Pancrustacea
- Class: Insecta
- Order: Coleoptera
- Suborder: Polyphaga
- Infraorder: Cucujiformia
- Family: Chrysomelidae
- Subfamily: Eumolpinae
- Tribe: Typophorini
- Genus: Zohrana; Aslam, 1968

Type species
- Liniscus sansibaricus Lefèvre, 1885

Synonyms
- Liniscus Lefèvre, 1885 (nec Dujardin, 1844)

= Zohrana =

Genus of leaf beetles

Zohrana is a genus of leaf beetles in the subfamily Eumolpinae. It is known from Africa. It is also sometimes known as Zohranus.

The genus was originally named Liniscus by Édouard Lefèvre in 1885; however, this name was preoccupied by Liniscus Dujardin, 1844 (a nematode genus), so it was renamed to Zohrana by N. A. Aslam in 1968.

== Species ==
- Zohrana koulmannensis (Selman, 1963)
- Zohrana puncticollis (Bryant, 1959)
- Zohrana rhodesiana (Achard, 1925)
- Zohrana sansibarica (Lefèvre, 1885)
- Zohrana semistriata (Pic, 1950)
- Zohrana semiviridis (Pic, 1939)
- Zohrana substriata (Weise, 1909)
- Zohrana substriatipennis (Pic, 1939)
- Zohrana sudanica (Weise, 1926)
- Zohrana testacea (Pic, 1939)
- Zohrana usambarica (Weise, 1909)
