= Bedelia (beetle) =

Scientific classification
- Kingdom: Animalia
- Phylum: Arthropoda
- Clade: Pancrustacea
- Class: Insecta
- Order: Coleoptera
- Suborder: Polyphaga
- Infraorder: Cucujiformia
- Family: Chrysomelidae
- Subfamily: Eumolpinae
- Tribe: Typophorini
- Genus: Bedelia; Lefèvre, 1875

Type species
- Bedelia insignis Lefèvre, 1875

Genus of leaf beetles

Bedelia is a genus of leaf beetles in the subfamily Eumolpinae. It is generally distributed in the Caucasus, Central Asia and East Asia. It was first described by Édouard Lefèvre in 1875, for two species from Persia collected by Ernest Marie Louis Bedel (which are now considered to be the same species). It was considered by Lefèvre to be closely related to Chloropterus.

== Species ==
- Bedelia insignis Lefèvre, 1875 (Synonyms: Bedelia angustata Lefèvre, 1875; Nodostoma kokanica Solsky, 1881) – Azerbaijan, Armenia, Georgia, southern European Russia, Afghanistan, Iran, Kyrgyzstan, Kazakhstan, Tajikistan, Turkmenistan, Turkey, Uzbekistan
- Bedelia kaschgarica Lopatin, 1962 – China (Xinjiang)
- Bedelia viridicoerulea Reitter, 1901 – Kyrgyzstan, Tajikistan, Uzbekistan
