= Shinsaku Kimoto =

Japanese entomologist (1933–2009)

Shinsaku Kimoto (Japanese: 木元新作; 1933 – 19 February 2009) was a Japanese entomologist specialising in the Leaf beetle family (Chrysomelidae).

== Publications ==
- Gressitt, J.L. & Kimoto S. (1961). The Chrysomelidae (Coleopt.) of China and Korea. Part 1. Pacific Insects 1A: 1–299.
- Gressitt, J.L. & Kimoto S. (1963). The Chrysomelidae (Coleopt.) of China and Korea. Part 2. Pacific Insects 1B: 301–1026.
- Gressitt, J.L. & Kimoto S. (1963). Supplement to "The Chrysomelidae (Coleopt.) of China and Korea". Pacific Insects 5(4): 921–932; pdf
- Kimoto, S. (1967). Notes on the Chrysomelidae from Taiwan I. Kontyû 35(4): 368–374.
- Kimoto, S. (1969). Notes on the Chrysomelidae from Taiwan II. Esakia 7: 1–68; pdf
- Kimoto, S. (1971). Notes on the Chrysomelidae from Taiwan VI. Entomological review of Japan 23(2): 73–87; pdf
- Kimoto, S. (1974). Notes on the Chrysomelidae from Taiwan VII. Entomological review of Japan 26(1–2): 21–26; pdf
- Kimoto, S. (1976). Notes on the Chrysomelidae from Taiwan VIII. Entomological review of Japan 29(1–2): 1–9; pdf
- Kimoto, S. (1978). Revisional Study on the Japanese Species of Genus Hemipyis Dejean (Coleoptera, Chrysomelidae, Alticinae). Entomological review of Japan 31(1–2): 13–21; pdf
- Kimoto, S. (1978). Notes on the Chrysomelidae from Taiwan IX. Entomological review of Japan 31(1–2): 69–74; pdf
- Kimoto, S. (1979). New or little known Chrysomelidae (Coleoptera) from Japan and its adjacent regions, II. Entomological review of Japan 33(1–2): 41–45; pdf
- Kimoto, S. & Gressitt, J.L. (1979). Chrysomelidae (Coleoptera) of Thailand, Cambodia, Laos and Vietnam. I. Sagrinae, Donaciinae, Zeugophorinae, Megalopodinae and Criocerinae. Pacific Insects 20(2–3): 191–256; pdf
- Kimoto, S. (1981). Revisional Study on the Japanese Species of Genus Medythia Jacoby (Col., Chrysomelidae, Galerucinae). Entomological review of Japan 35(1–2): 7–11; pdf
- Kimoto, S. & Takizawa, H. (1981). Chrysomelid-beetles of Nepal, Collected by the Hokkaido University Scientific Expeditions to Nepal Himalaya, 1968 and 1975. Part III (Coleoptera). Entomological review of Japan 35(1–2): 51–65; pdf
- Kimoto, S. (1981). Notes on the Chrysomelidae from Taiwan, China, X. Entomological review of Japan 36(1): 1–4; pdf
- Kimoto, S. (1981). The Cassidinae of Nepal, Bhutan and Northern Territories of India, in the Natural History Museum in Basel (Coleoptera, Chrysomelidae). Entomological review of Japan 36(1): 55–62; pdf
- Kimoto, S. & Gressitt, J.L. (1981). Chrysomelidae (Coleoptera) of Thailand, Cambodia, Laos and Vietnam. II. Clytrinae, Cryptocephalinae, Lamprosomatinae and Chrysomelinae. Pacific Insects 23(3–4): 286–391; pdf
- Kimoto, S. (1982). The Galerucinae of Nepal, Bhutan and Northern Territories of India, in the Natural History Museum in Basel. II. (Coleoptera, Chrysomelidae). Entomological review of Japan 37(1): 7–24; pdf
- Kimoto, S. & Gressitt, J.L. (1982). Chrysomelidae (Coleoptera) of Thailand, Cambodia, Laos and Vietnam. III. Eumolpinae. Esakia 18: 1–141; pdf
- Kimoto, S. (1983). Revisional Study on Megalopodinae, Donaciinae and Clytrinae of Japan (Coleoptera: Chrysomelidae). Entomological review of Japan 38(1): 5–23.
- Kimoto, S. (1983). New or little known Chrysomelidae (Coleoptera) from Japan and its adjacent regions, III. Entomological review of Japan 38(1): 45–54.
- Kimoto, S. (1984). Notes on Chrysomelidae from Taiwan, China, XI. Entomological review of Japan 39(1): 39–58; pdf
- Kimoto, S. (1986). New or little known Chrysomelidae (Coleoptera) from Japan and its adjacent regions, V. Entomological review of Japan 41(2): 123–129; pdf
- Kimoto, S. (1987). Descriptions of Two New Species of Chrysomelidae (Coleoptera) Collected by the Nagoya University Scientific Expedition to Taiwan in 1986. Entomological review of Japan 42(2): 95–98; pdf
- Kimoto, S. (1989). Revisional Study on the Japanese Species of Genus Argopus Fischer (Col, Chrysomelidae, Alticinae). Entomological review of Japan 44(1): 21–24; pdf
- Kimoto, S. (1989). Chrysomelidae (Coleoptera) of Thailand, Cambodia, Laos and Vietnam. IV. Galerucinae. Esakia 27: 1–241; pdf
- Kimoto, S. (1989). Description of a new genus and three new species of Taiwanese Chrysomelidae (Coleoptera) collected by Dr. Kintaro Baba, on the occasion of his entomological survey in 1986. Entomological review of Japan 44(2): 73–78; pdf
- Kimoto, S. (1990). Check-list of Chrysomelidae of South East Asia, South of Thailand and West of Irian-Jaya of Indonesia, VI. Galerucinae, 2. Kurume University Journal 39: 201–237.
- Kimoto, S. (1991). Description of a new genus and six new species of Chrysomelidae (Coleoptera) collected by Dr. Kintaro Baba, in Taiwan, China. Entomological review of Japan 46(1): 13–20; pdf
- Kimoto, S. (1991). Notes on Chrysomelidae from Taiwan, China, XII. Entomological review of Japan 46(2): 115–124; pdf
- Kimoto, S. & Takahashi, Y. (1992). Description of a New Species of Galerucinae (Chrysomelidae, Col.) from Japan. Entomological review of Japan 47(2): 99–101; pdf
- Kimoto, S. (1993). New or little known Chrysomelidae (Coleoptera) from Japan and its adjacent regions, VI. Entomological review of Japan 48(2): 93–101; pdf
- Kimoto, S. (1994). Description of a new galerucid species from Taiwan, China (Coleoptera: Chrysomelidae). Transactions of the Shikoku Entomological Society 20: 191–192.
- Kimoto, S. & Osawa, S. (1995). Description of a New Species of the Genus Ambrostoma Motschulsky from Taiwan, China (Coleoptera, Chrysomelidae, Chrysomelinae). Entomological review of Japan 50(1): 15–16; pdf
- Kimoto, S. & Chu, Y. (1996). Systematic catalog of Chrysomelidae of Taiwan (Insecta: Coleoptera). Bulletin of the Institute of Comparative Studies of International Cultures and Societies 16: 1–152.
- Kimoto, S. (1996). Notes on Chrysomelidae from Taiwan, China, XIII. Entomological review of Japan 51(1): 27–51; pdf
- Kimoto, S. (1998). Chrysomelidae (Coleoptera) of Thailand, Laos and Vietnam. V. Cassidinae. Bulletin of the Institute of Comparative Studies of International Cultures and Societies 21: 1–88.
- Kimoto, S. (1998). Check-list of Chrysomelidae of South East Asia, south of Thailand and west of Irian-Jaya of Indonesia, VII. Cassidinae. Bulletin of the Institute of Comparative Studies of International Cultures and Societies 22: 59–113.
- Kimoto, S. (2001). The Chrysomelidae (Insecta: Coleoptera) collected by the Kyushu University Scientific Expedition to the Nepal Himalaya in 1971 and 1972. Bulletin of the Kitakyushu Museum of Natural History 20: 17–80.
- Kimoto, S. (2003). The Chrysomelidae (Insecta: Coleoptera) collected by Dr. Akio Otake, on the occasion of his entomological survey in Sri Lanka from 1973 to 1975. Bulletin of the Kitakyushu Museum of Natural History and Human History Series A Natural History 1: 23–43.
- Kimoto, S. (2005). Systematic catalog of the Chrysomelidae (Coleoptera) from Nepal and Burma. Bulletin of the Kitakyushu Museum of Natural History and Human History Series A Natural History 3: 13–114.
