= Edgar von Harold =

German entomologist (1830–1886)

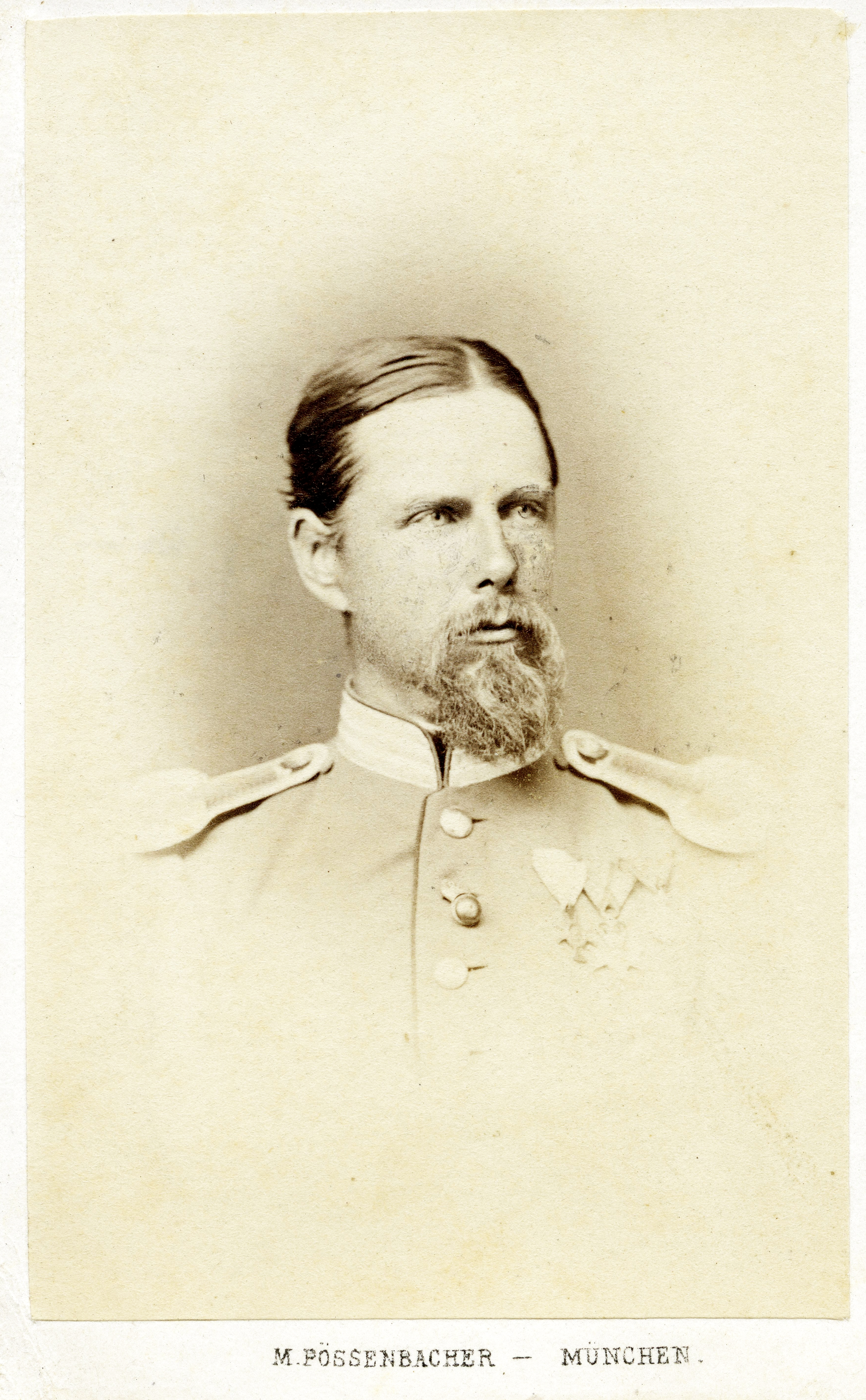
- Born: 30 May 1830; Munich, Kingdom of Bavaria, German Confederation
- Died: 1 August 1886 (aged 56)
- Known for: Catalogus Coleopterorum

Baron Edgar von Harold (30 May 1830 – 1 August 1886) was a Scarabaeidae expert and entomologist who was active in the 19th century. He worked along with Max Gemminger to produce a twelve-volume catalogue of beetles.

== Biography ==
Edgar von Harold was born in Munich to a German family with Irish origins. He completed his early education at the court of the Bavarian King from where he graduated in the year 1848. In 1848 Harold joined the Royal Guard of the King of Bavaria where he would serve for twenty years. During this period he participated in the Austro-Prussian War and the Franco-Prussian War. He was injured in Kissingen. At the end of his military career, Harold was sent on a trip to the coast of Spain and Morocco, to study the local insect fauna. After his retirement from the Royal Guard, Harold devoted his time fully to entomology.

One of the major contributions by Harold was the Catalogus Coleopterorum, which he co-authored with his friend Max Gemminger. They started the work in 1868 and the last volume of the work was published in 1876. He edited the Coleopterische Hefte (1867-1879) and the Mittheilungen des Münchener Entom. Vereins (1877-1881) while also serving as a curator of the entomological section of the Berlin Museum from 1877 to 1880. Poor eyesight prevented him from continuing and he died from a stomach cancer.

== See also ==
- Category:Taxa named by Edgar von Harold
