= Jan Bechyně =

Czech entomologist

Jan Karel Bechyně
- Born: 19 September 1920; Přibyslav, Czechoslovakia
- Died: 9 March 1973 (aged 52); Maracay, Venezuela

Academic work
- Discipline: Entomology
- Sub-discipline: Coleopterist
- Institutions: University of Maracay

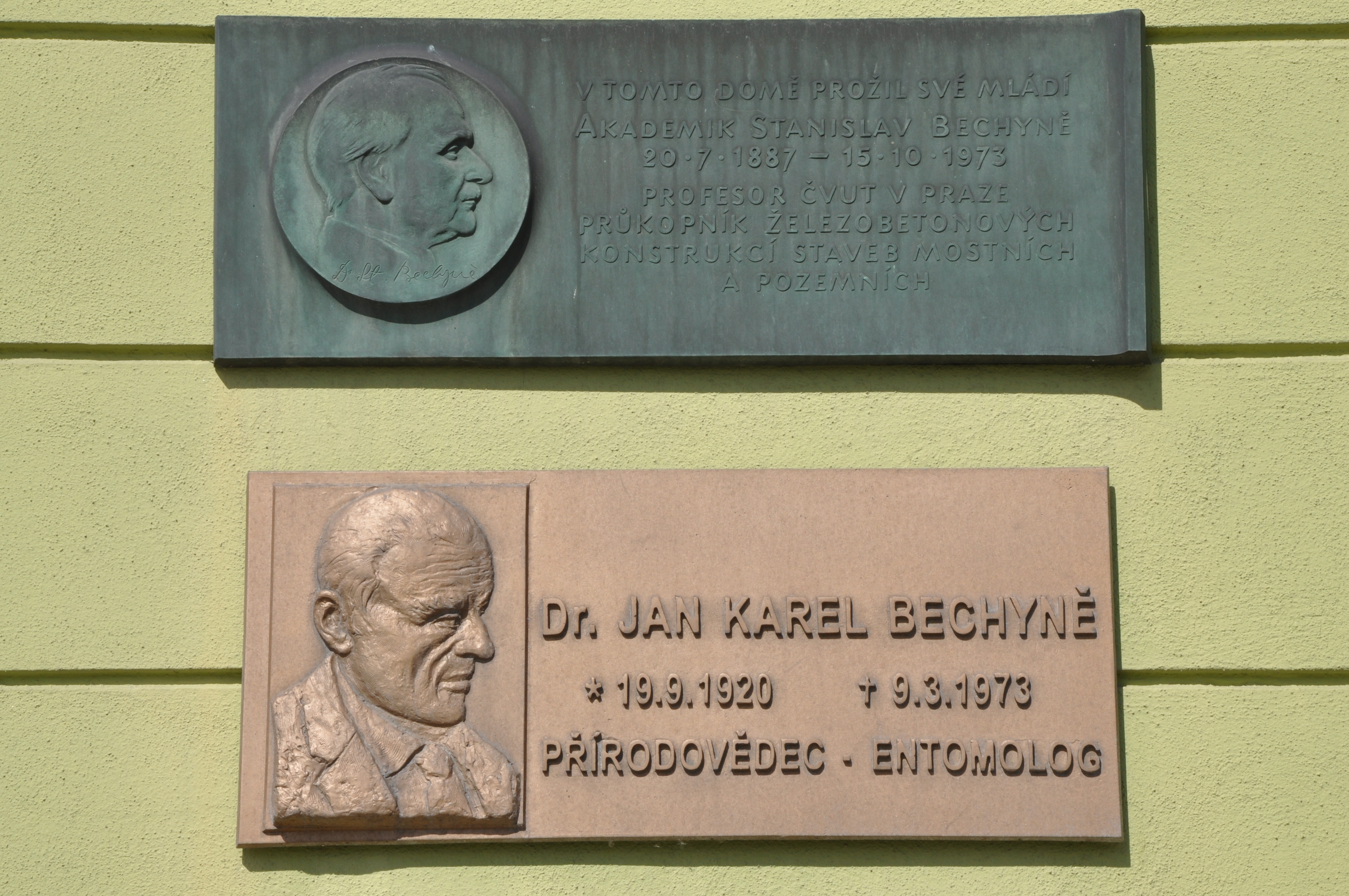
Plaque of Jan Bechyné (bottom)

Jan Karel Bechyně (19 September 1920 – 9 March 1973) was a Czech entomologist and a leading authority on leaf beetles (Chrysomelidae). He was the son of photographer Jan Bechyně and nephew of architect Stanislav Bechyně.

== Career ==
Bechyně studied at the University of Prague, graduating in 1948 with a thesis titled "Příspěvek k poznání phyllogenese a zoogeografie rodu Timarcha Latr." (on the phylogeny and zoogeography of the genus Timarcha Latr.). He emigrated from the Czechoslovakia in 1948 and never subsequently returned.

He worked in natural history museums in Munich and at the Museum of Natural Sciences in Brussels before moving to Los Angeles and later South America, where he researched in Brazil, San Salvador, and Peru before gaining a professorial post at the University of Maracay in Venezuela.

Bechyně was the first to propose combating the Colorado potato beetle with pests in Europe.

His wife, Bohumila Špringlová, shared his interest in entomology and continued to represent Jan at entomological conferences after his death.

The beetle species Clinidium bechyneorum is named for Jan and B. Bechyne, noting that their "fine series of Clinidium have made the Rhysodine fauna of Venezuela the best known of any South American country."

== Selected publications ==
- Bechyně, Jan (1956). C. M. F. von Hayek (ed.). Open Air Guides: Beetles: with over 250 illustrations of beetles 48 of which are in colour from originals by B. Bechyně and 59 diagrams. Translated by C. M. F. von Hayek. London and New York: Thames and Hudson.
