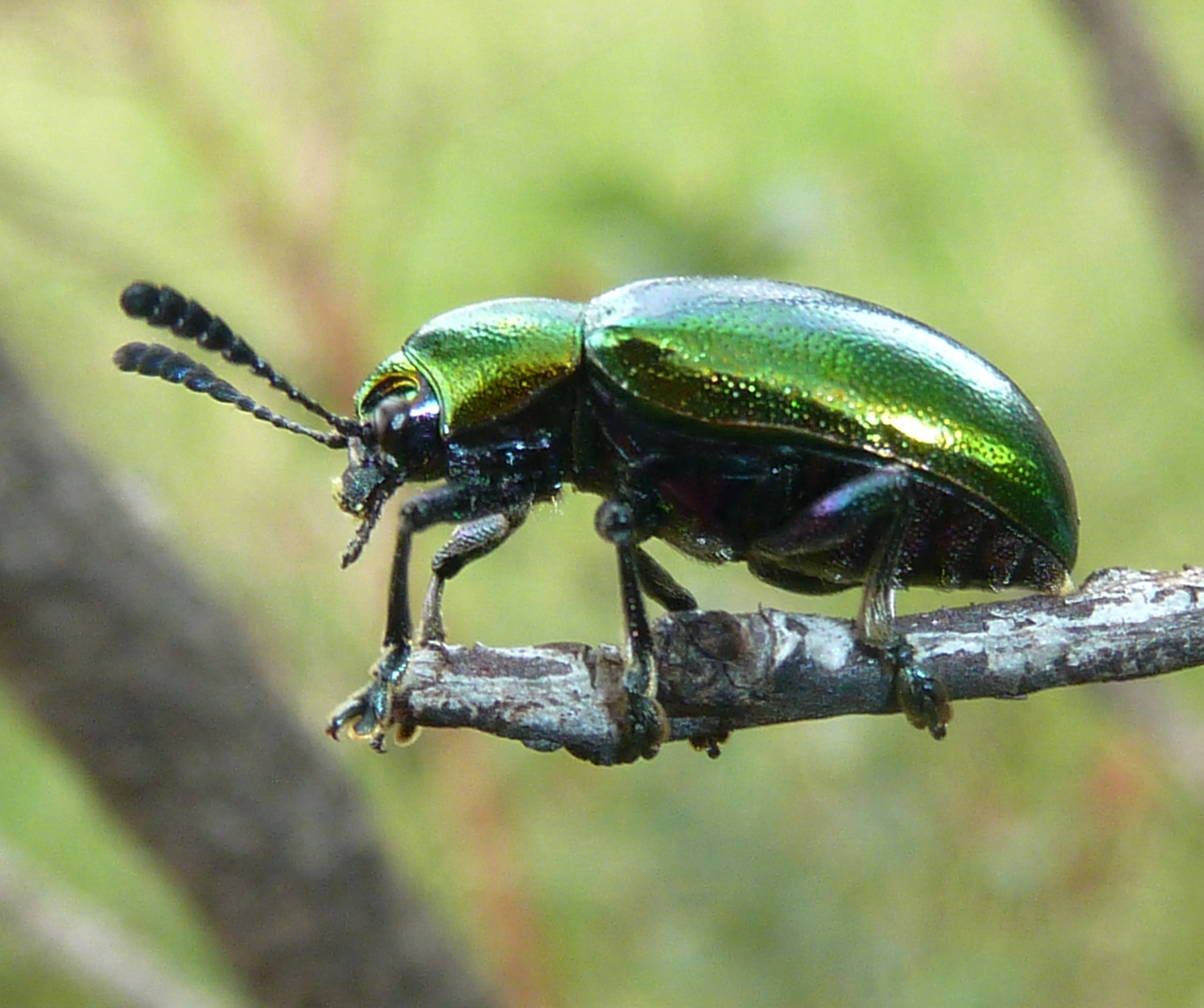
- P. dejeani in South Africa

Scientific classification
- Kingdom: Animalia
- Phylum: Arthropoda
- Clade: Pancrustacea
- Class: Insecta
- Order: Coleoptera
- Suborder: Polyphaga
- Infraorder: Cucujiformia
- Family: Chrysomelidae
- Subfamily: Eumolpinae
- Tribe: Eumolpini
- Genus: Platycorynus; Chevrolat in Dejean, 1836

Type species
- Eumolpus compressicornis Fabricius, 1801

Synonyms
- Corynodes Hope, 1840; Eudora Laporte, 1840; Batycolpus Marshall, 1865; Erigenes Marshall, 1865; Eurycorynus Marshall, 1865; Omodon Marshall, 1865; Theumorus Marshall, 1865; Corynoeides Clark, 1865; Neolycaria Abdullah & Qureshi, 1969

= Platycorynus =

Genus of leaf beetles

Platycorynus is a genus of leaf beetles in the subfamily Eumolpinae. Species of the genus are found in Africa and Asia.

== Taxonomy ==
The generic name "Platycorynus" first appeared in the second and third editions of Dejean's Catalogue of Coleoptera, where it was attributed to Chevrolat. Nine species were listed for the genus, four of which were nomina nuda at the time of publication, but no formal description was given for it. The genus was later briefly characterized by Frederick William Hope in 1840, under the new name "Corynodes". In 1865, Thomas Ansell Marshall published a monograph on Corynodes, dividing it into seven subgenera: Platycorynus, Corynodes, Theumorus, Eurycorynus, Omodon, Erigenes, and Bathycolpus. The latter five were originally intended to be new genera. In the same year, Hamlet Clark created a new genus, Corynoeides, for one of the species placed in Corynodes. However, Joseph Sugar Baly did not accept Clark's genus nor Marshall's subdivisions. In 1956, Monrós & Bechyné pointed out that Platycorynus Chevrolat in Dejean, 1836 was available and had priority over Corynodes Hope, 1840, and that therefore the former should be used as the valid name for the genus.

According to Volume 6 of the Catalogue of Palearctic Coleoptera, published in 2010, Corynodes, Corynoeides, Eudora, Neolycaria and all of Marshall's subgenera are now treated as synonyms of Platycorynus.

== Species ==
The genus includes the following species:

- Platycorynus abyssinicus (Jacoby, 1886)
  - Platycorynus abyssinicus abyssinicus (Jacoby, 1886)
  - Platycorynus abyssinicus niloticus Kuntzen, 1914
- Platycorynus aemulus (Lefèvre, 1889)
- Platycorynus aeneus Baly, 1864
- Platycorynus affinis (Chen, 1934)
- Platycorynus ahmadi (Abdullah & Qureshi, 1969)
- Platycorynus amethystinus (Marshall, 1865)
- Platycorynus andamanensis (Lefèvre, 1891)
- Platycorynus angularis Tan, 1982
- Platycorynus angulicollis (Jacoby, 1884)
- Platycorynus apicalis Kimoto & Gressitt, 1982
- Platycorynus approximans Baly, 1864
- Platycorynus arcuatefasciatus (Pic, 1938)
- Platycorynus argentipilus Tan, 1982
- Platycorynus asphodelus (Marshall, 1865)
- Platycorynus assamensis (Baly, 1879)
- Platycorynus aureipennis (Baly, 1867)
- Platycorynus azureus (Sahlberg, 1829)
- Platycorynus backoensis Medvedev & Rybakova, 1985
- Platycorynus bakeri (Weise, 1922)
- Platycorynus balyi (Jacoby, 1884)
- Platycorynus basalis (Jacoby, 1884)
- Platycorynus bellus (Chen, 1940)
- Platycorynus bengalensis (Duvivier, 1890)
- Platycorynus biseriatus Baly, 1864
- Platycorynus brevipennis (Jacoby, 1896)
- Platycorynus buonloicus Medvedev & Rybakova, 1985
- Platycorynus cavifrons (Jacoby, 1908)
- Platycorynus ceylonensis (Jacoby, 1908)
- Platycorynus chalybaeus (Marshall, 1865)
- Platycorynus chrysis (Olivier, 1808)
- Platycorynus chrysochoides Chen, 1940
- Platycorynus chapanus (Chen, 1934)
- Platycorynus circumductus (Marshall, 1865)
- Platycorynus coelestinus Baly, 1864
- Platycorynus coeruleatus (Baly, 1867)
- Platycorynus coeruleicollis (Pic, 1940)
- Platycorynus compressicornis (Fabricius, 1801)
- Platycorynus congener Baly, 1864
- Platycorynus costatus Baly, 1864
- Platycorynus costipennis (Chen, 1940)
- Platycorynus cribratellus (Fairmaire, 1885)
- Platycorynus cumingi Baly, 1864
- Platycorynus cupreoviridis Tan, 1992
- Platycorynus cupreatus (Baly, 1867)
- Platycorynus cupreus Baly, 1864
- Platycorynus cyanicollis (Olivier, 1791)
- Platycorynus davidi (Lefèvre, 1887)
- Platycorynus decemnotatus (Baly, 1860)
- Platycorynus dejeani Bertoloni, 1849
- Platycorynus deletus (Lefèvre, 1890)
- Platycorynus dentatus Tan, 1982
- Platycorynus descarpentriesi (Selman, 1970)
- Platycorynus discoidalis (Jacoby, 1898)
- Platycorynus dohrni Baly, 1864
- Platycorynus egenus (Lefèvre, 1887)
- Platycorynus egregrius (Lefèvre, 1885)
- Platycorynus elegantulus Baly, 1864
- Platycorynus fabricii Baly, 1864
- Platycorynus faroogi (Abdullah & Qureshi, 1969)
- Platycorynus fraternus Baly, 1864
- Platycorynus fulgurans (Marshall, 1865)
- Platycorynus fuscoaeneus Baly, 1864
- Platycorynus gibbosus (Chen, 1934)
- Platycorynus grahami Gressitt & Kimoto, 1961
- Platycorynus gratiosus Baly, 1864
- Platycorynus hijau Medvedev & Takizawa, 2011
- Platycorynus hirsutus (Jacoby, 1895)
- Platycorynus igneicollis (Hope, 1843)
- Platycorynus igneipennis (Baly, 1867)
- Platycorynus igneofasciatus (Baly, 1860)
- Platycorynus ignitus Baly, 1864
- Platycorynus impressicollis (Jacoby, 1908)
- Platycorynus indigaceus Chevrolat, 1841
- Platycorynus iridescens (Berlioz, 1917)
- Platycorynus janthinus (Marshall, 1865)
- Platycorynus japonicus (Jacoby, 1896)
  - Platycorynus japonicus japonicus (Jacoby, 1896)
  - Platycorynus japonicus umebayashii Kimoto, 1974
- Platycorynus kivuensis (Burgeon, 1940)
- Platycorynus laeviusculus (Lefèvre, 1888)
- Platycorynus languei (Lefèvre, 1893)
- Platycorynus laosensis Kimoto & Gressitt, 1982
- Platycorynus lateralis (Hope, 1831)
- Platycorynus latus (Pic, 1934)
- Platycorynus lefevrei (Jacoby, 1895)
- Platycorynus limbatus (Baly, 1881)
  - Platycorynus limbatus congoensis (Burgeon, 1940)
  - Platycorynus limbatus limbatus (Baly, 1881)
- Platycorynus longicornis Baly, 1864
- Platycorynus lorquini (Baly, 1867)
- Platycorynus malachiticus (Marshall, 1865)
- Platycorynus marginalis (Weise, 1912)
  - Platycorynus marginalis luluensis (Burgeon, 1940)
  - Platycorynus marginalis marginalis (Weise, 1912)
- Platycorynus marshalli Baly, 1864
- Platycorynus mentaweiensis (Jacoby, 1896)
- Platycorynus micans (Chen, 1934)
- Platycorynus micheli (Lesne, 1900)
- Platycorynus minutus (Pic, 1934)
- Platycorynus modestus (Jacoby, 1908)
- Platycorynus monstrosus (Baly, 1867)
- Platycorynus mouhoti Baly, 1864
- Platycorynus multicostatus (Jacoby, 1895)
- Platycorynus mutabilis Baly, 1864
- Platycorynus nasiri (Abdullah & Qureshi, 1969)
- Platycorynus niger (Chen, 1940)
  - Platycorynus niger niger (Chen, 1940)
  - Platycorynus niger yunnanensis Tan, 1982
- Platycorynus nigripes (J. Thomson, 1858)
- Platycorynus nitidus (Fabricius, 1792)
- Platycorynus obesus (Jacoby, 1908)
- Platycorynus parryi Baly, 1864
- Platycorynus parvofossulatus (Kuntzen, 1913)
- Platycorynus parvulus Baly, 1864
- Platycorynus peregrinus (Herbst, 1783)
- Platycorynus perplexus Baly, 1864
- Platycorynus plebejus (Weise, 1889)
- Platycorynus pretiosus Baly, 1864
- Platycorynus propinquus (Baly, 1867)
- Platycorynus pubicollis Medvedev & Rybakova, 1985
- Platycorynus pulchellus (Baly, 1860)
- Platycorynus punctatissimus (Frölich, 1792)
- Platycorynus punctatus Tan, 1982
- Platycorynus purpureimicans Tan, 1982
- Platycorynus pyrophorus (Parry, 1843)
- Platycorynus pyrospilotus (Baly, 1860)
- Platycorynus raffrayi (Lefèvre, 1877)
- Platycorynus robustus Baly, 1864
- Platycorynus roseus Tan, 1982
- Platycorynus rufescens Medvedev & Takizawa, 2011
- Platycorynus rufipennis (Pic, 1934)
- Platycorynus rugipennis (Jacoby, 1895)
- Platycorynus rugosus Kimoto & Gressitt, 1982
- Platycorynus rutilans (Lefèvre, 1884)
- Platycorynus sauteri (Chûjô, 1938)
- Platycorynus schwaneri (Lefèvre, 1890)
- Platycorynus sheppardi Baly, 1864
- Platycorynus simplicicornis (Lefèvre, 1885)
- Platycorynus speciosus (Lefèvre, 1891)
- Platycorynus splendens Medvedev, 2015
- Platycorynus stevensi Baly, 1864
- Platycorynus suaveolus (Marshall, 1865)
- Platycorynus subcarinatus (Pic, 1927)
- Platycorynus subcostatus (Jacoby, 1894)
- Platycorynus sulcus Tan, 1982
- Platycorynus sumbawensis (Jacoby, 1895)
- Platycorynus superbus (Weise, 1922)
- Platycorynus tonkinensis (Lefèvre, 1893)
- Platycorynus travancorensis (Jacoby, 1908)
- Platycorynus tridentatus (Jacoby, 1908)
- Platycorynus trilobatus (Baly, 1867)
- Platycorynus tuberculatus Baly, 1864
- Platycorynus undatus (Olivier, 1791)
- Platycorynus unituberculatus (Jacoby, 1894)
- Platycorynus verschureni Selman, 1972
- Platycorynus victinus (Pic, 1940)
- Platycorynus viridanus (Baly, 1867)
- Platycorynus waterhousei Baly, 1864

Synonyms:

- Corynodes beauchenei Jacoby, 1889: synonym of Platycorynus aemulus (Lefèvre, 1889)
- Corynodes dilaticollis Jacoby, 1892: synonym of Platycorynus chalybaeus (Marshall, 1865)
- Corynodes fonkineus Lefèvre, 1893: synonym of Platycorynus deletus (Lefèvre, 1890)
- Corynodes gibbifrons Lefèvre, 1885: synonym of Platycorynus gratiosus Baly, 1864
- Corynodes paviei Lefèvre, 1890: synonym of Platycorynus chalybaeus (Marshall, 1865)
- Platycorynus birmanicus (Jacoby, 1896): synonym of Platycorynus chalybaeus (Marshall, 1865)
- Platycorynus florentini (Lefèvre, 1893): synonym of Platycorynus speciosus (Lefèvre, 1891)

Species moved to other genera:

- Corynodes (?) fulvicollis Jacoby, 1889: moved to Chalcolema

== Gallery ==
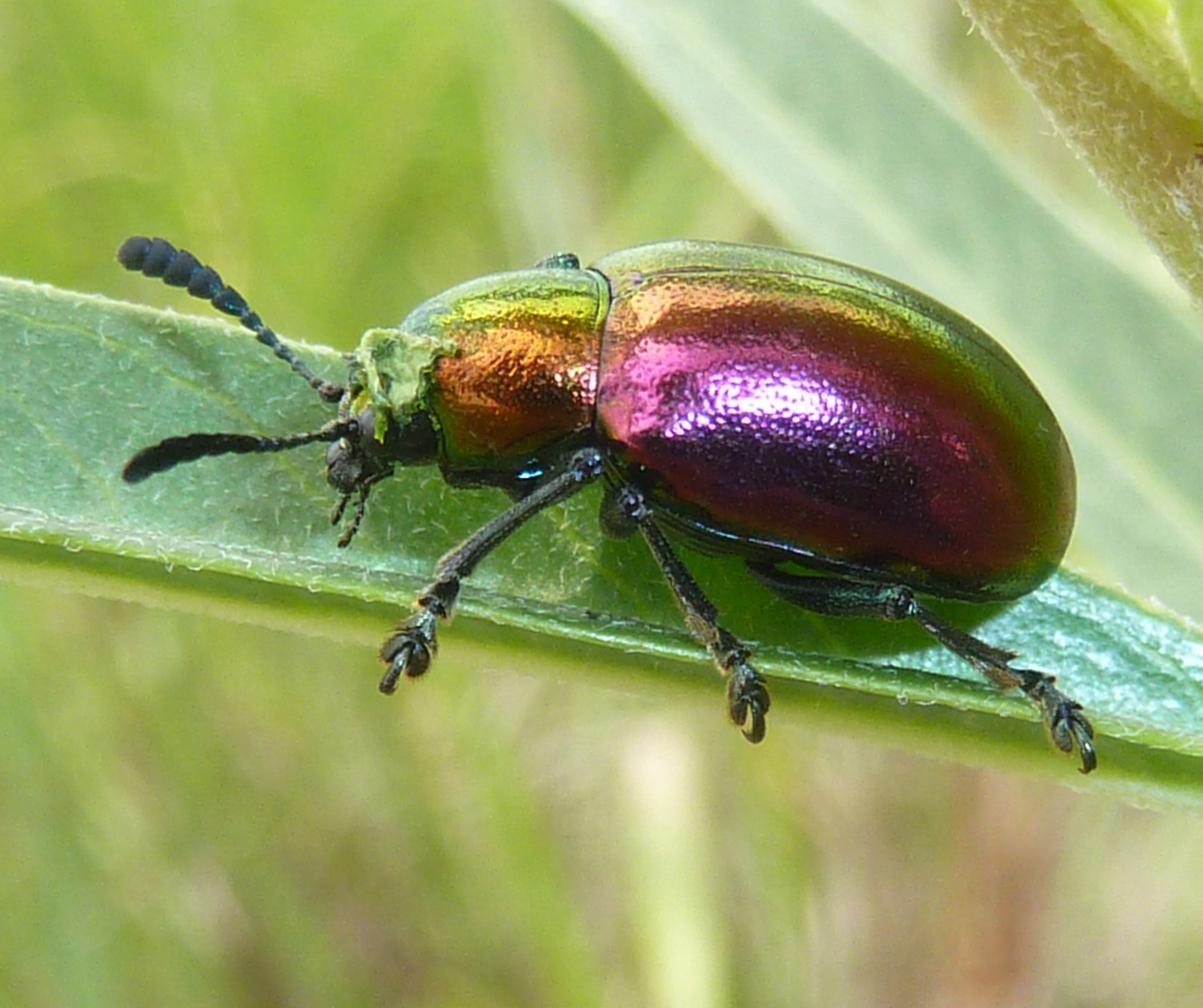
P. dejeani on milkweed

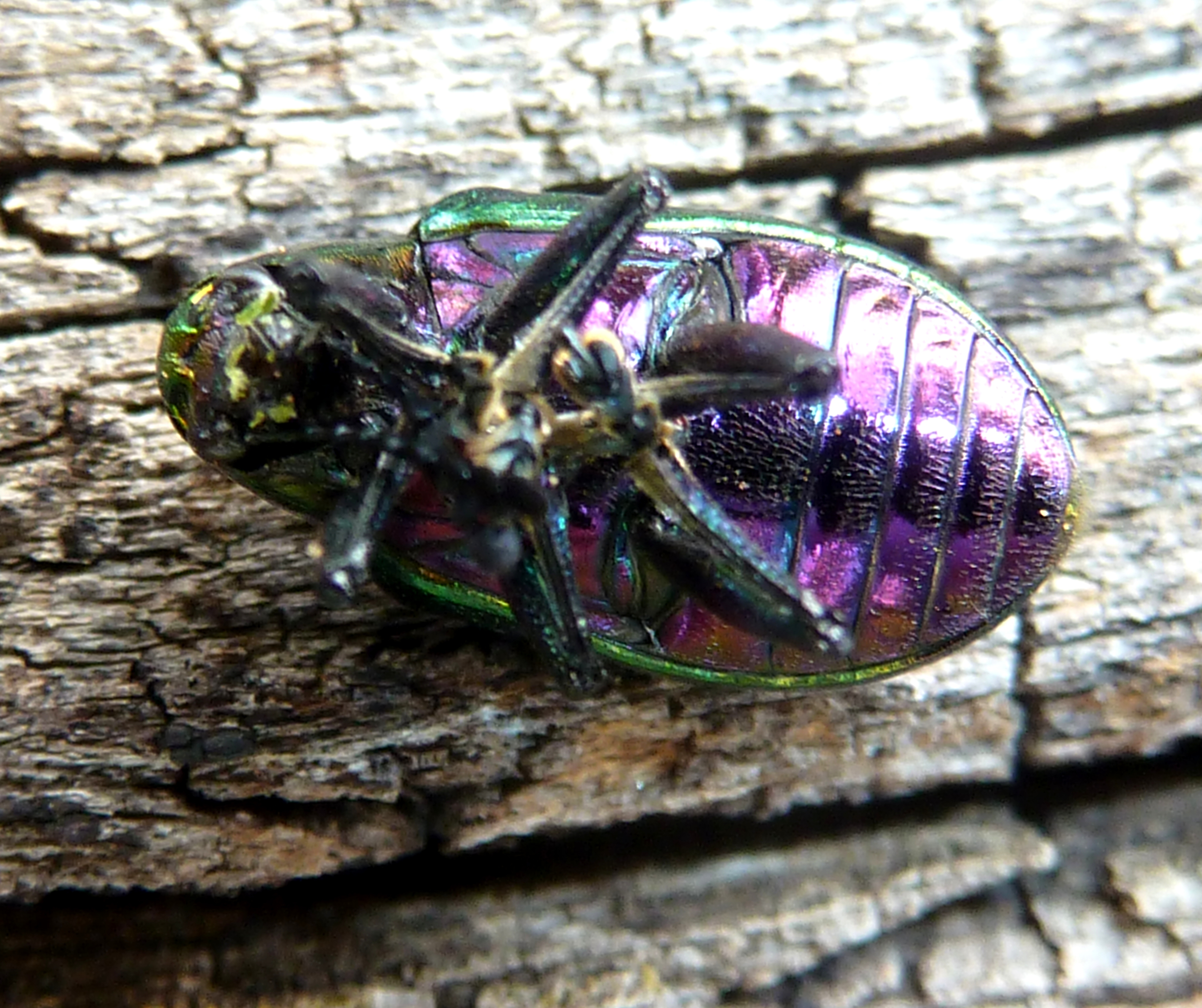
P. dejeani feigning death

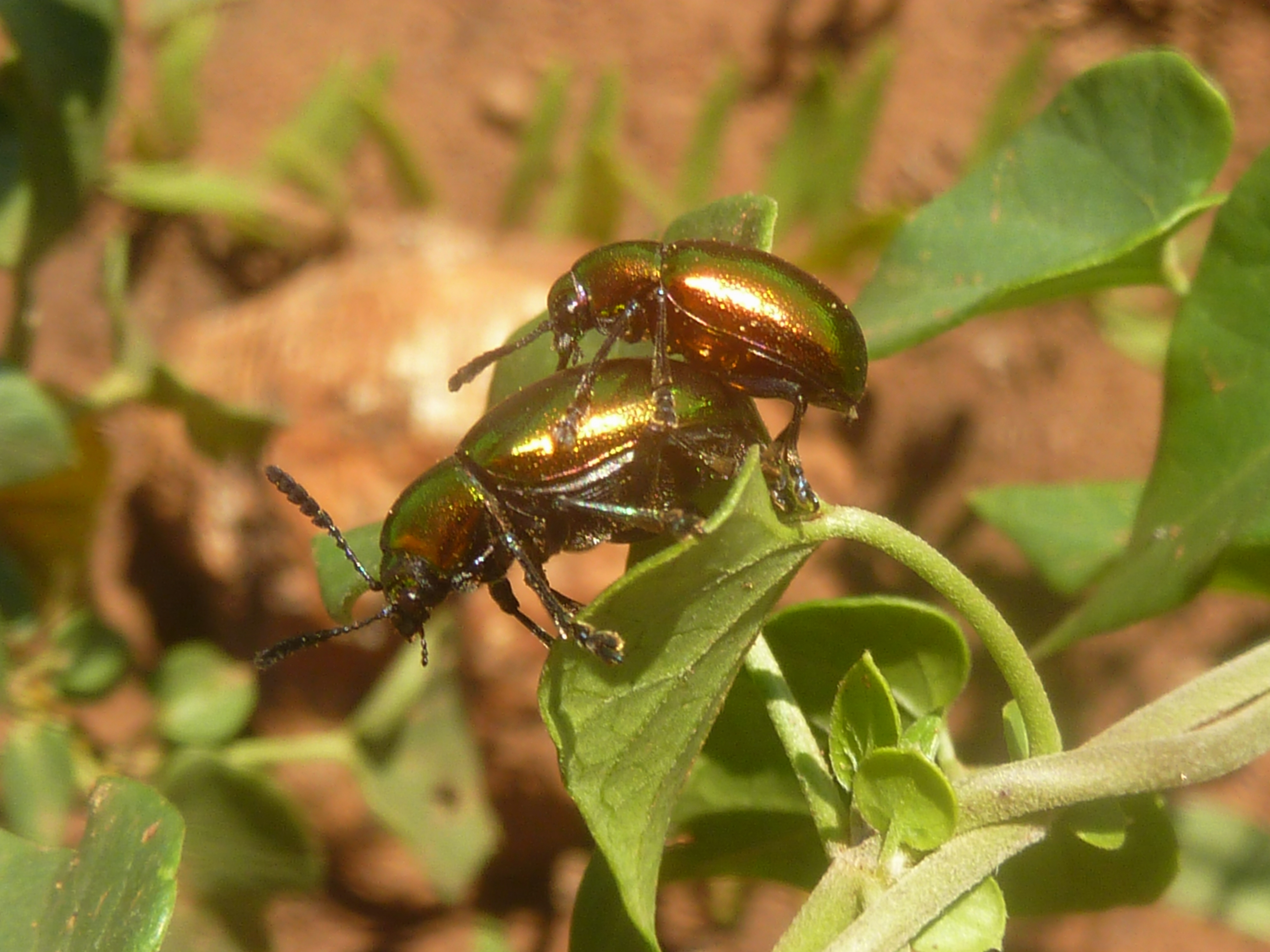
P. dejeani mating pair
