= Prionodera =

Scientific classification
- Kingdom: Animalia
- Phylum: Arthropoda
- Clade: Pancrustacea
- Class: Insecta
- Order: Coleoptera
- Suborder: Polyphaga
- Infraorder: Cucujiformia
- Family: Chrysomelidae
- Subfamily: Eumolpinae
- Tribe: Eumolpini
- Genus: Prionodera; Chevrolat in Dejean, 1836

Type species
- Colaspis bicolor Olivier, 1808

Synonyms
- Stenolampra Baly, 1859; Aporus Lefèvre, 1884 (nec Spinola, 1808); Aporistus Lefèvre, 1885; Jodasia Bechyné, 1951

Genus of beetles

Prionodera is a genus of leaf beetles in the subfamily Eumolpinae. It is known from Central and South America.

== Species ==
- Prionodera adiastola Flowers, 2004 – Ecuador, Brazil (Amazonas)
- Prionodera arimanes Flowers, 2004 – Bolivia
- Prionodera bicolor (Olivier, 1808) – Brazil (Amazonas, Rondônia), French Guiana, Ecuador
  - Prionodera bicolor bicolor (Olivier, 1808)
  - Prionodera bicolor tenuepunctata Bechyné, 1950
- Prionodera costata (Baly, 1859) – Brazil (Amazonas)
- Prionodera cyanea (Lefèvre, 1884) – French Guiana
- Prionodera dichroma Flowers, 2004 – Panama
- Prionodera esmeralda Flowers, 2004 – Costa Rica
- Prionodera furcada Flowers, 2004 – Panama, Colombia
- Prionodera gaiophanes Flowers, 2004 – Ecuador
- Prionodera geniculata (Baly, 1859) – Brazil (Amazonas), Ecuador
- Prionodera kirschi (Lefèvre, 1877) – Peru, Brazil (Amazonas, Rondônia)
- Prionodera lutea Erichson, 1847 – Bolivia
- Prionodera marshalli Lefèvre, 1884 – Brazil (Rio de Janeiro)
- Prionodera merana Bechyné, 1950 (Synonym: Jodasia roseometallica Bechyné, 1953) – Ecuador, Peru
- Prionodera nila Flowers, 2004 – Panama
- Prionodera peruviana (Bechyné, 1951) – Peru

The following species have been transferred to other genera:

- Prionodera amasia (Marshall, 1864): transferred to Metaxyonycha
- Prionodera chloroptera Germar, 1824: transferred to Metaxyonycha
- Prionodera hirtipennis Jacoby, 1881: transferred to Metaxyonycha
- Prionodera limbata Jacoby, 1890: transferred to Metaxyonycha
- Prionodera nixa Bechyné, 1953: transferred to Prionoderita
- Prionodera ocanana Lefèvre, 1878: transferred to Metaxyonycha
- Prionodera salvini Jacoby, 1881: transferred to Metaxyonycha
