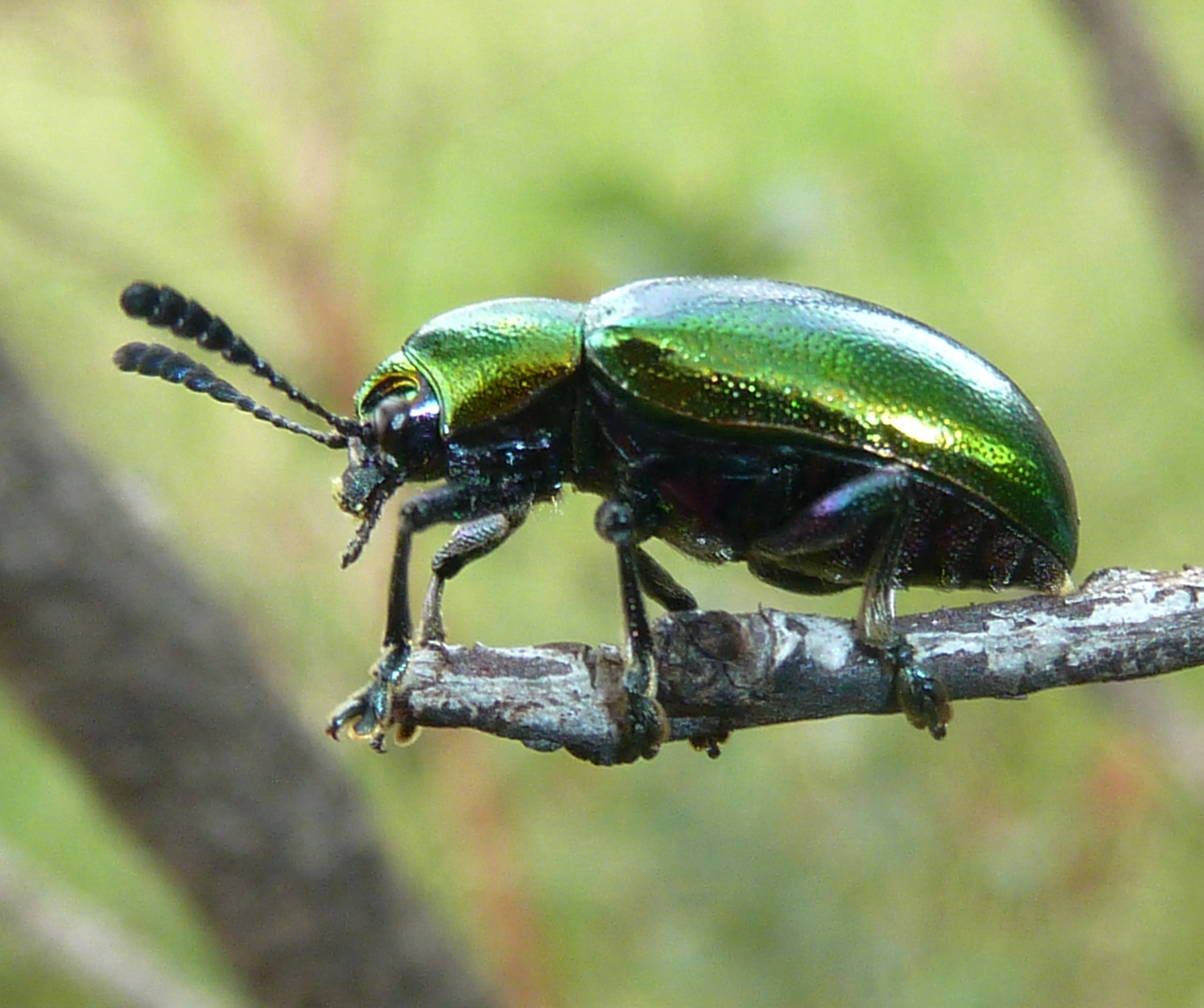

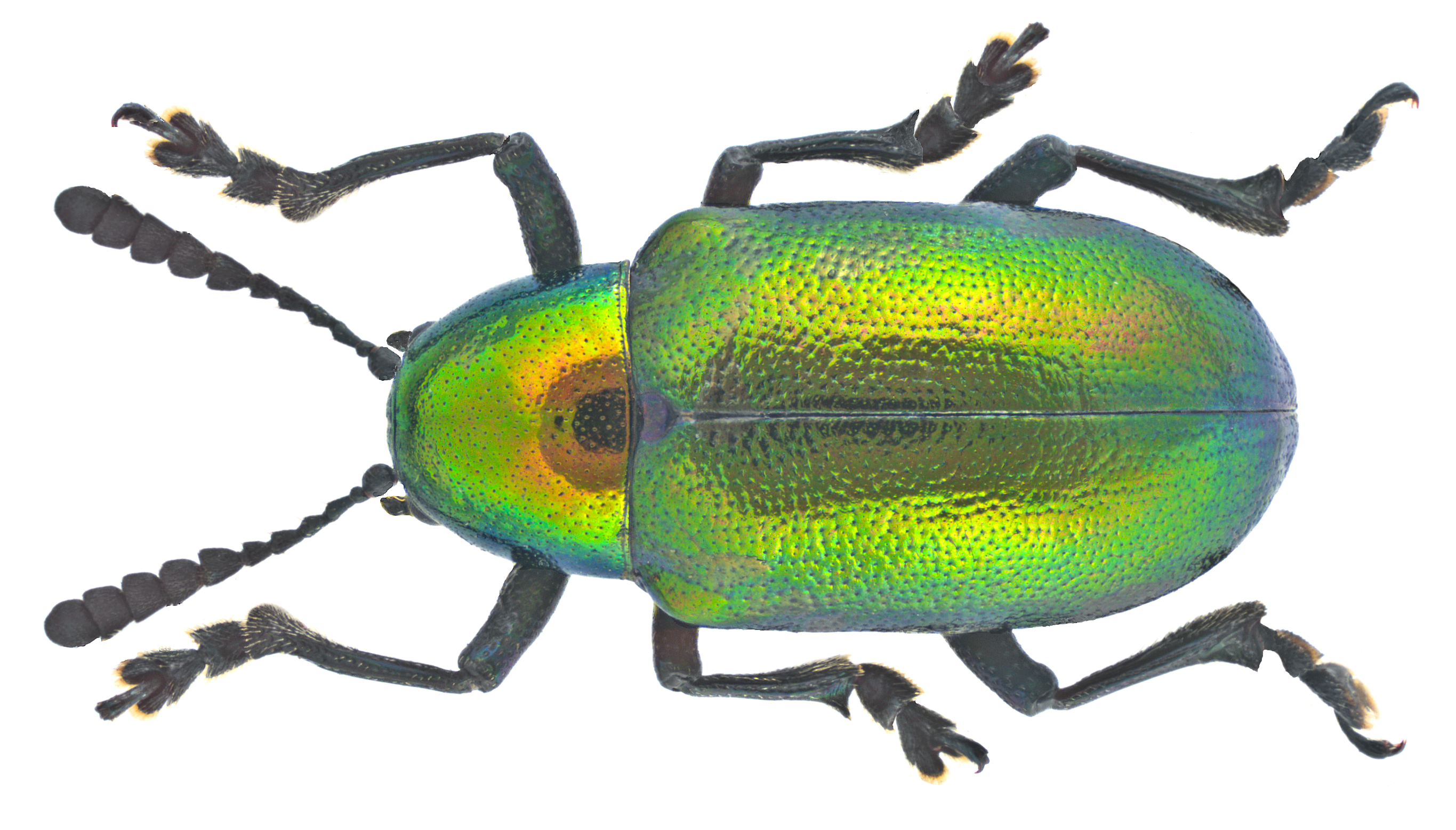

Scientific classification
- Kingdom: Animalia
- Phylum: Arthropoda
- Clade: Pancrustacea
- Class: Insecta
- Order: Coleoptera
- Suborder: Polyphaga
- Infraorder: Cucujiformia
- Family: Chrysomelidae
- Genus: Platycorynus
- Species: P. dejeani

Binomial name
- Platycorynus dejeani Bertoloni, 1849

Synonyms
- Corynodes (Platycorynus) compressicornis var. D Marshall, 1865; Corynodes (Platycorynus) pusio Marshall, 1865; Corynodes insignis Lefèvre, 1890; Corynodes zombae Gahan, 1893; Corynodes usambius Kolbe, 1898; Corynodes weisei Clavareau, 1912; Corynodes dejeani ab. goetzei Kuntzen, 1913; Corynodes dejeani ab. kilimanus Kuntzen, 1913; Corynodes dejeani ab. kolbei Kuntzen, 1913; Corynodes dejeani ab. nyassicus Kuntzen, 1913; Corynodes dejeani ab. rhodesianus Kuntzen, 1913; Corynodes dejeani ab. septentrionalis Kuntzen, 1913; Corynodes dejeani ab. somalicus Kuntzen, 1913; Corynodes dejeani ab. tanganyikae Kuntzen, 1913; Corynodes dejeani var. teteanus Kuntzen, 1913; Corynodes dejeani ab. arcuaticollis Kuntzen, 1913

= Platycorynus dejeani =

Species of beetle

Platycorynus dejeani is a species of leaf beetle. It was first described by the Italian entomologist Giuseppe Bertoloni from Inhambane, Mozambique in 1849. It occurs widely in sub-Saharan Africa.

== Distribution ==
In East Africa, the species' range extends from Ethiopia down to the former Cape Province in South Africa. The species also occurs in Senegal, the Central African Republic and the Democratic Republic of the Congo.

== Gallery ==
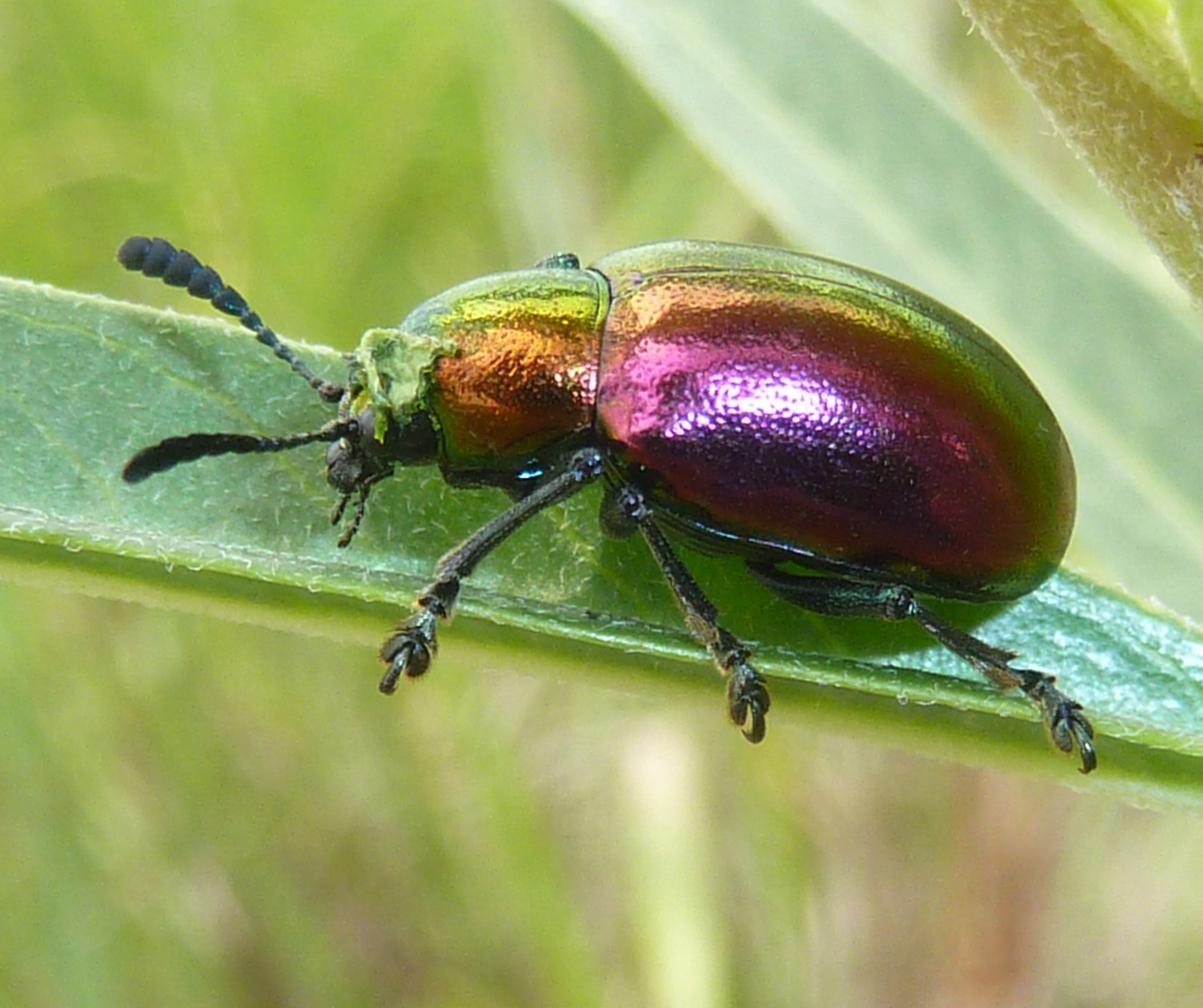
on milkweed

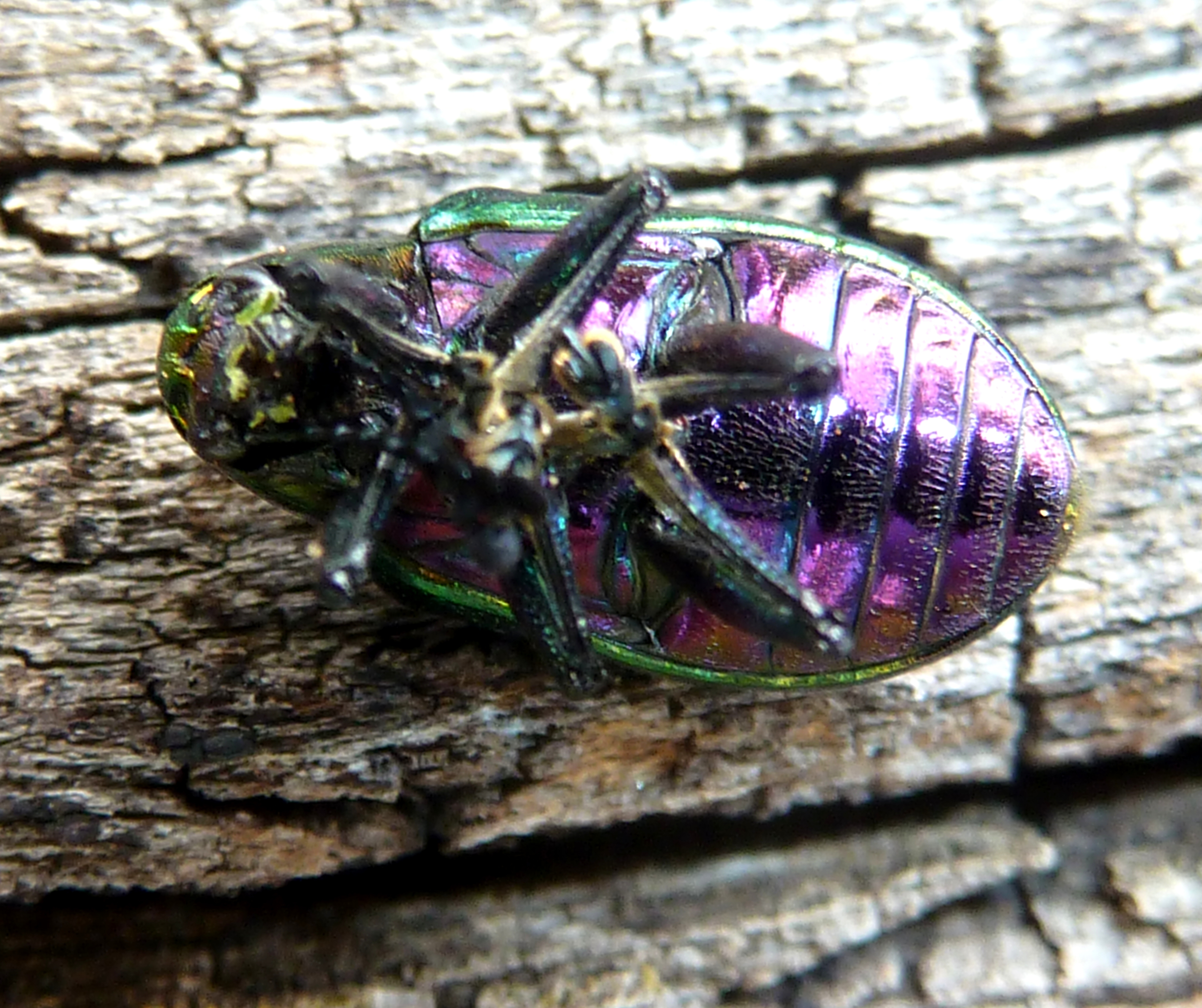
feigning death

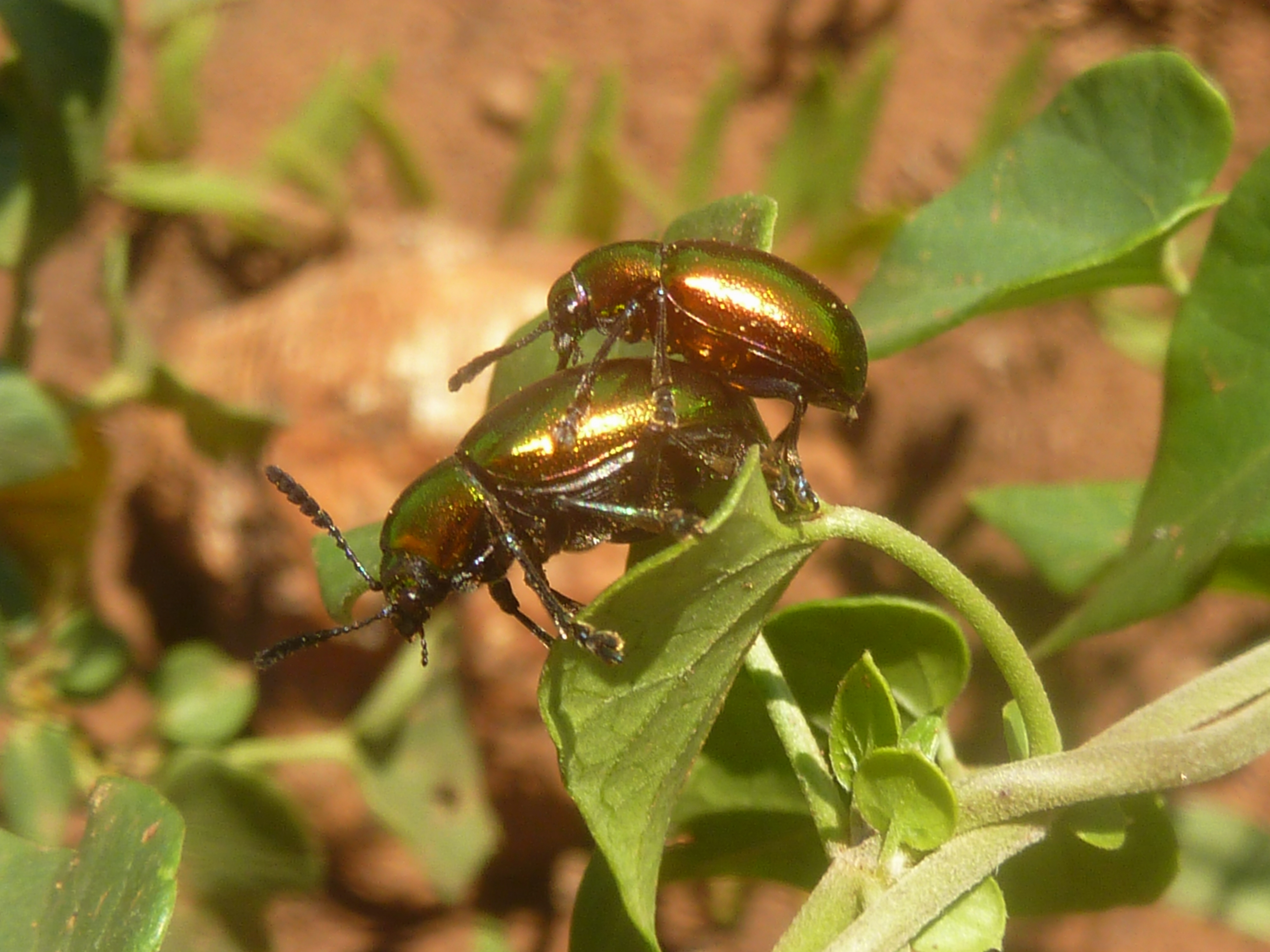
mating pair
