= Platycorynus azureus =

Scientific classification
- Kingdom: Animalia
- Phylum: Arthropoda
- Clade: Pancrustacea
- Class: Insecta
- Order: Coleoptera
- Suborder: Polyphaga
- Infraorder: Cucujiformia
- Family: Chrysomelidae
- Genus: Platycorynus
- Species: P. azureus

Binomial name
- Platycorynus azureus (Sahlberg, 1829)

Synonyms
- Eumolpus azureus Sahlberg, 1829; Eumolpus cyaneus Fabricius, 1801; Corynodes simillimus Marshall, 1865; Corynodes lautissimus Marshall, 1865; Corynodes longicollis Jacoby, 1894; Corynodes auripes Jacoby, 1901; Corynodes azureus ab. reinecki Kuntzen, 1913; Corynodes azureus ab. tessmanni Kuntzen, 1913

Species of beetle

Platycorynus azureus is a species of leaf beetle distributed from Senegal to the Democratic Republic of the Congo, Uganda and South Sudan, described by Carl Reinhold Sahlberg in 1829.
