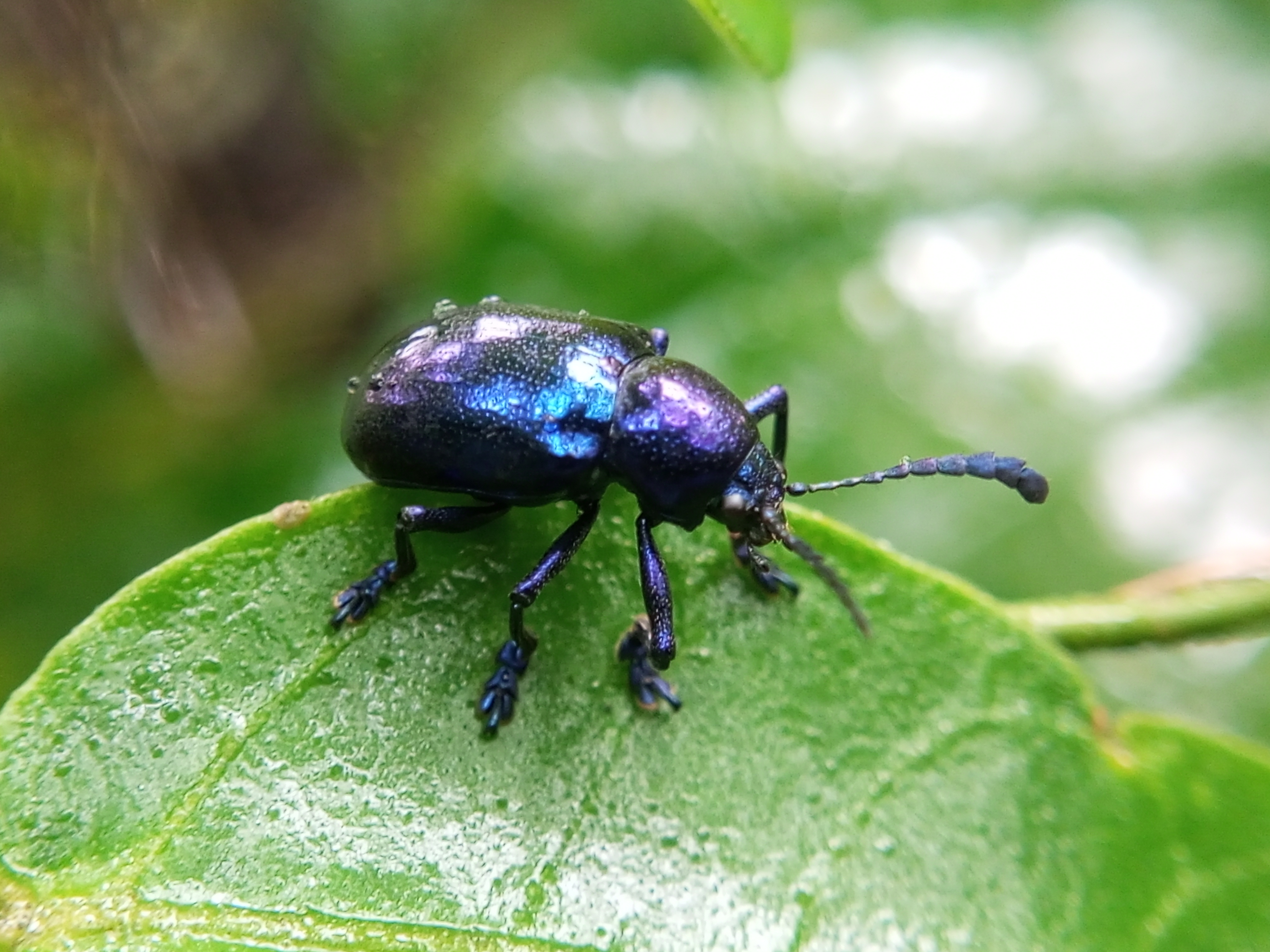

Scientific classification
- Kingdom: Animalia
- Phylum: Arthropoda
- Clade: Pancrustacea
- Class: Insecta
- Order: Coleoptera
- Suborder: Polyphaga
- Infraorder: Cucujiformia
- Family: Chrysomelidae
- Genus: Platycorynus
- Species: P. peregrinus

Binomial name
- Platycorynus peregrinus (Herbst, 1783)

Synonyms
- Cryptocephalus peregrinus Herbst, 1783; Eumolpus cyaneus Olivier, 1808; Corynodes peregrinus Marshall, 1865; Corynodes chapuisi Lefèvre, 1885; Corynodes bonneuili Pic, 1934; Platycorynus major Gressitt & Kimoto, 1961

= Platycorynus peregrinus =

Species of beetle

Platycorynus peregrinus is a species of beetles belonging to the Chrysomelidae family.

== Description ==
Platycorynus peregrinus can reach a length of 9–11.5 millimetres (0.35–0.45 in) and a width of 5–6 millimetres (0.20–0.24 in). The body is usually metallic blue, sometimes blue-black or blue-violet.

This leaf eating beetle is primarily herbivorous and secondarily graminivorous. The preferred host plants are the very toxic Calotropis procera, various Digitaria species and some plants of economic importance (e.g. Solanum melongena, Hibiscus esculentus, Abelmoschus esculentus, Lycopersicon esculentum and Solanum tuberosum).

== Distribution ==
This species can be found in Pakistan, India, Sri Lanka, Myanmar, Nepal, Thailand, Cambodia, Laos, Vietnam, SW China and Malaysia.
