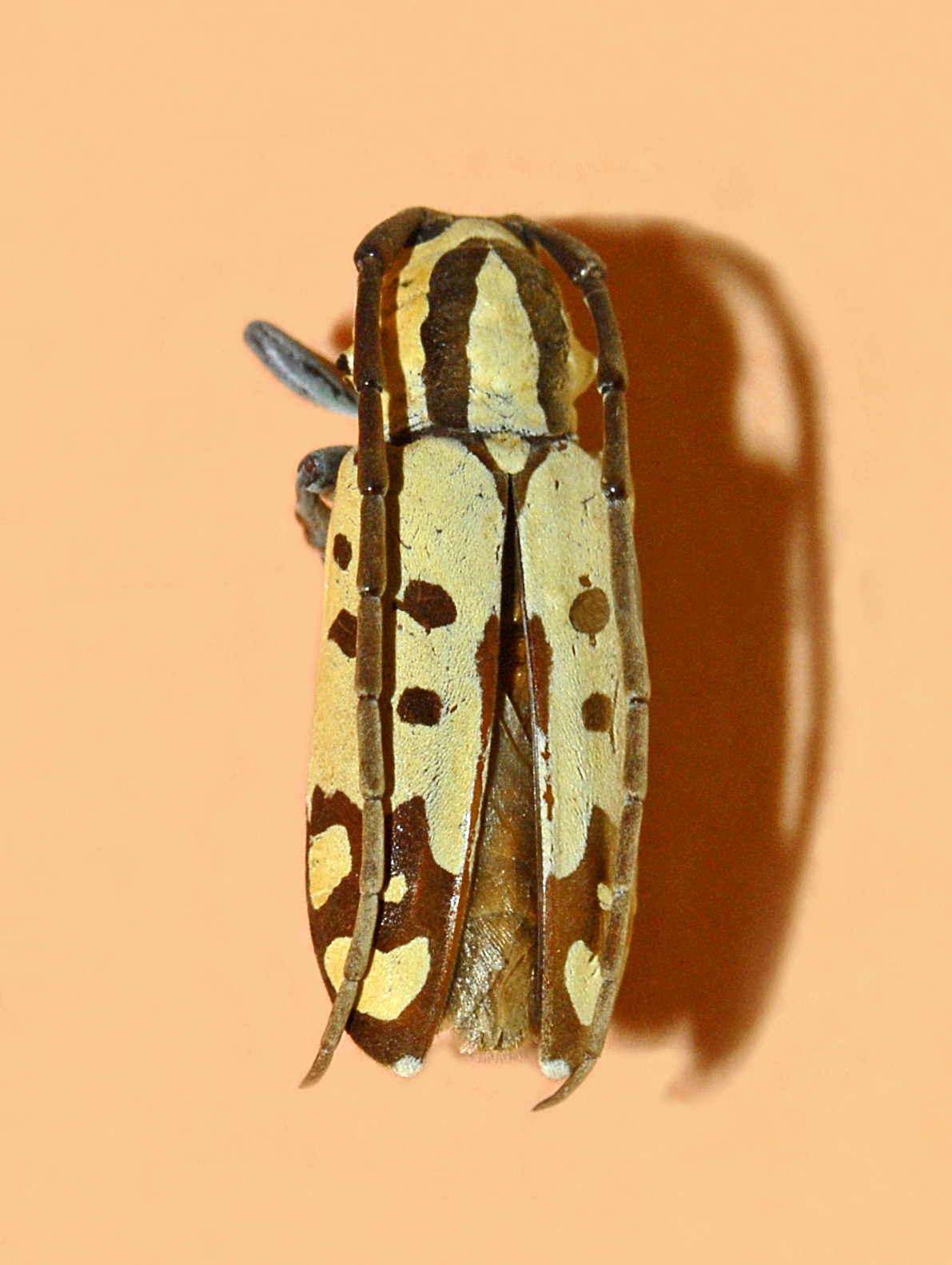
- Museum specimen of Tragocephala variegata

Scientific classification
- Domain: Eukaryota
- Kingdom: Animalia
- Phylum: Arthropoda
- Class: Insecta
- Order: Coleoptera
- Suborder: Polyphaga
- Infraorder: Cucujiformia
- Family: Cerambycidae
- Genus: Tragocephala
- Species: T. variegata

Binomial name
- Tragocephala variegata Bertoloni, 1849

Synonyms
- Tragocephala variegata m. bellamyi Téocchi, 1991; Tragocephala variegata m. pallida Breuning, 1970; Tragocephala venusta Thomson, 1857

= Tragocephala variegata =

Species of beetle

Tragocephala variegata, the longhorn shoot borer, is a species of flat-faced longhorn beetles belonging to the family Cerambycidae.

== Varietas ==
- Tragocephala variegata var. albida Aurivillius, 1923
- Tragocephala variegata var. chevrolatii White, 1856
- Tragocephala variegata var. kaslica Thomson, 1878
- Tragocephala variegata var. nigropunctata Harold, 1878
- Tragocephala variegata var. sulphurea Breuning, 1934
- Tragocephala variegata var. vittata (Fåhraeus, 1872)

== Description ==
Tragocephala variegata can reach a body length of about 17–26 millimetres (0.67–1.02 in). These longhorn beetles have yellow elytra with irregular black markings. Pronotum is divided by a central longitudinal yellow stripe.

These beetles feed on Baobab (Adansonia digitata), Spanish Cedar (Cedrela odorata), Mango (Mangifera indica), Blackeyed Pea (Vigna unguiculata), Senegal Mahogany (Khaya senegalensis).

== Distribution ==
This species can be found in Angola, Democratic Republic of the Congo, Equatorial Guinea, Ethiopia, Kenya, Malawi, Mozambique, Namibia, Somalia, South Africa, Sudan, Tanzania, Zambia and Zimbabwe, but there have been minor sightings in other Central African countries.
