= Tragocephala gorilla =

Scientific classification
- Kingdom: Animalia
- Phylum: Arthropoda
- Clade: Pancrustacea
- Class: Insecta
- Order: Coleoptera
- Suborder: Polyphaga
- Infraorder: Cucujiformia
- Family: Cerambycidae
- Genus: Tragocephala
- Species: T. gorilla

Binomial name
- Tragocephala gorilla Thomson, 1857

Synonyms
- Tragocephala gorilla var. nigrovittata Aurivillius, 1914; Tragocephala gorilla var. intermedia Aurivillius, 1914; Tragocephala nobilis m. gorilla Breuning, 1934

Species of beetle

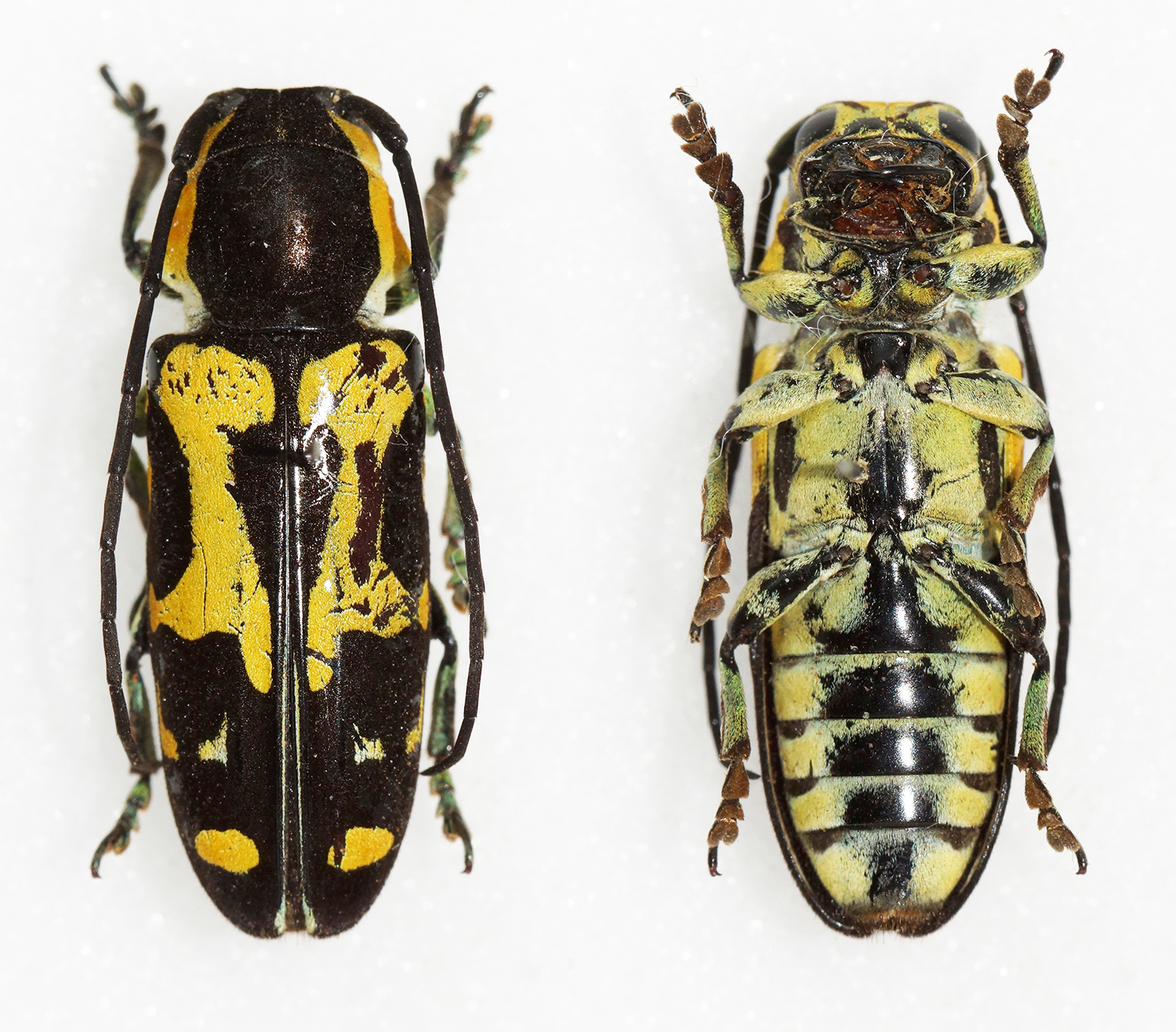
Tragocephala gorilla

Tragocephala gorilla is a species of beetle in the family Cerambycidae. It was described by James Thomson in 1857. It is known from Guinea, Uganda, Gabon, and the Democratic Republic of the Congo.
