= Platycorynus descarpentriesi =

Scientific classification
- Kingdom: Animalia
- Phylum: Arthropoda
- Clade: Pancrustacea
- Class: Insecta
- Order: Coleoptera
- Suborder: Polyphaga
- Infraorder: Cucujiformia
- Family: Chrysomelidae
- Genus: Platycorynus
- Species: P. descarpentriesi

Binomial name
- Platycorynus descarpentriesi (Selman, 1970)

Synonyms
- Corynodes descarpentriesi Selman, 1970

Species of beetle

Platycorynus descarpentriesi is a species of leaf beetle of the Republic of the Congo and the Democratic Republic of the Congo. It was first described by Brian J. Selman in 1970, from specimens collected from Dimonika, Mayumbe in the Republic of the Congo by André Descarpentries and André Villiers in 1964.
