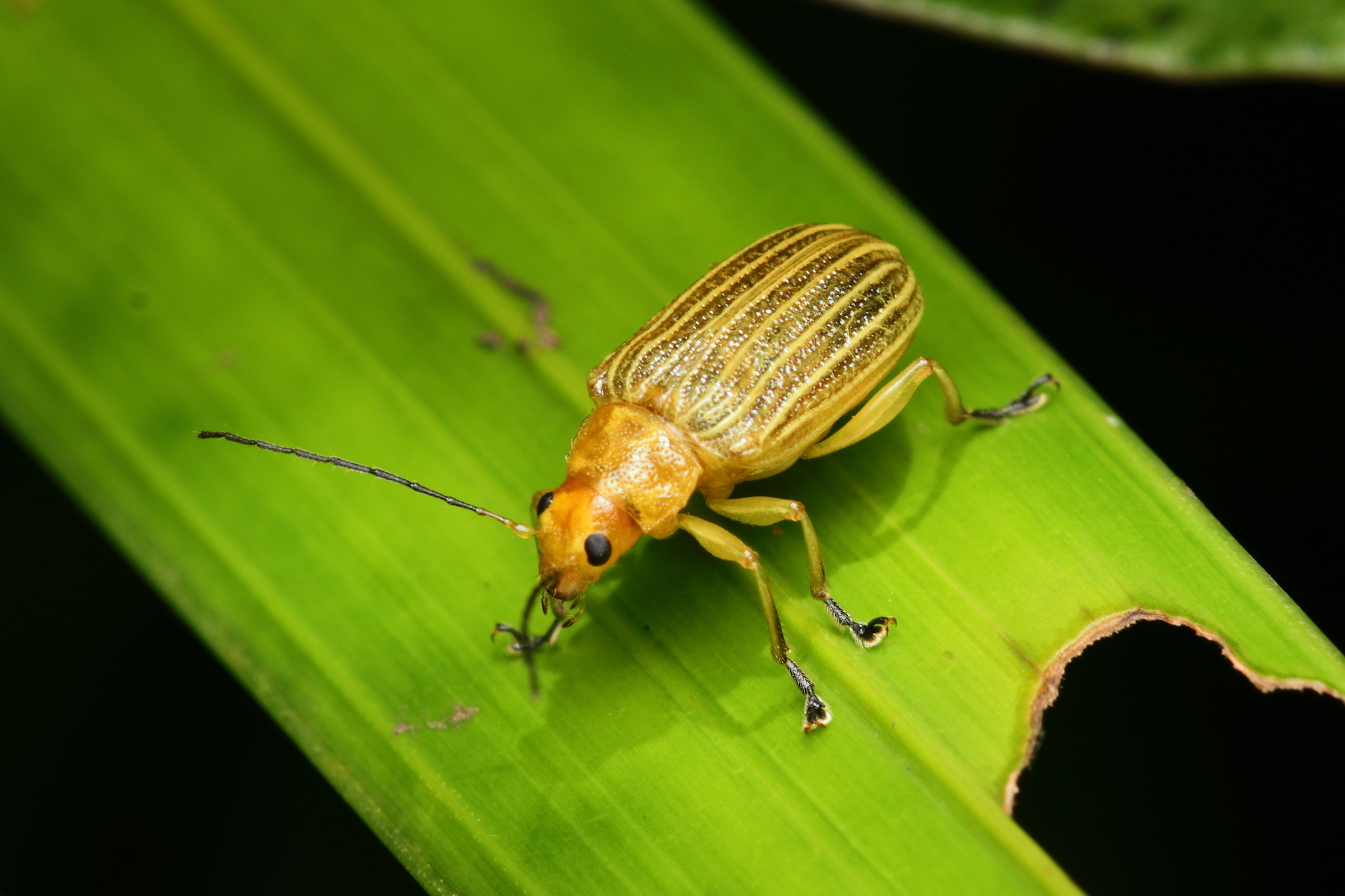
- Metaxyonycha granulata, Brazil

Scientific classification
- Kingdom: Animalia
- Phylum: Arthropoda
- Clade: Pancrustacea
- Class: Insecta
- Order: Coleoptera
- Suborder: Polyphaga
- Infraorder: Cucujiformia
- Family: Chrysomelidae
- Subfamily: Eumolpinae
- Tribe: Eumolpini
- Genus: Metaxyonycha; Chevrolat in Dejean, 1836

Type species
- Colaspis testacea Fabricius, 1801

Synonyms
- Herostrates Gistel, 1848; Aracyntha Harold, 1874

= Metaxyonycha =

Genus of leaf beetles

Metaxyonycha is a genus of leaf beetles in the subfamily Eumolpinae.

== Taxonomy ==
Metaxyonycha was first named by Louis Alexandre Auguste Chevrolat in 1836, with the spelling "Metazyonycha", in Dejean's Catalogue of Coleoptera. According to Bousquet and Bouchard in 2013, Metaxyonycha is an incorrect subsequent spelling of Metazyonycha. However, because the subsequent spelling is in prevailing usage and is attributed to the original spelling's publication, "Metaxyonycha" is considered the correct spelling.

In some publications for the Neotropical realm, Metaxyonycha is also known as "Colaspis". This was because the Czech entomologist Jan Bechyné had synonymised Metaxyonycha with Colaspis, after incorrectly assuming the two had the same type species, while splitting the species of Colaspis listed in the Coleopterorum Catalogus (a beetle catalog edited by Wilhelm Junk and Sigmund Schenkling) into a separate genus known as "Maecolaspis". As a result, Bechyné was using the name Colaspis for what was actually Metaxyonycha.

== Species ==
The following species belong to the genus Metaxyonycha (or Colaspis sensu Bechyné):

- Metaxyonycha acuminipennis (Blanchard, 1843)
- Metaxyonycha amasia Marshall, 1864
- Metaxyonycha apochroma (Bechyné & Bechyné, 1976)
- Metaxyonycha argentiniensis Bechyné, 1949
- Metaxyonycha augusta (Perty, 1832)
  - Metaxyonycha augusta augusta (Perty, 1832)
  - Metaxyonycha augusta kosñipata (Bechyné & Bechyné, 1968)
- Metaxyonycha auripennis (Germar, 1824)
- Metaxyonycha boggianii (Bechyné, 1957)
- Metaxyonycha bogotensis Jacoby, 1900
  - Metaxyonycha bogotensis bogotensis Jacoby, 1900
  - Metaxyonycha bogotensis splendicans (Bechyné & Bechyné, 1968)
- Metaxyonycha bondari (Bechyné & Bechyné, 1968)
- Metaxyonycha carminea (Bechyné, 1955)
- Metaxyonycha chloroptera (Germar, 1824)
- Metaxyonycha chlorospila Marshall, 1864
- Metaxyonycha chotana (Bechyné, 1958)
- Metaxyonycha comica (Bechyné, 1953)
- Metaxyonycha concinna Lefèvre, 1883
- Metaxyonycha connexa Marshall, 1864
- Metaxyonycha corpulenta (Bechyné, 1955)
- Metaxyonycha costata Lefèvre, 1877
- Metaxyonycha crucifera Marshall, 1864
- Metaxyonycha defficiens (Bechyné, 1953)
- Metaxyonycha denieri (Bechyné, 1953)
- Metaxyonycha diringshofeni (Bechyné & Bechyné, 1968)
- Metaxyonycha distincta Baly, 1881
- Metaxyonycha dominga (Bechyné, 1958)
- Metaxyonycha elegans Lefèvre, 1883
- Metaxyonycha elytrospila (Bechyné & Bechyné, 1968)
- Metaxyonycha excentritarsis (Bechyné & Bechyné, 1968)
- Metaxyonycha fasciata Lefèvre, 1875
  - Metaxyonycha fasciata caurensis (Bechyné & Bechyné, 1968)
  - Metaxyonycha fasciata fasciata Lefèvre, 1875
- Metaxyonycha flavofasciata (Bowditch, 1921)
- Metaxyonycha fuscovitatta (Bechyné, 1954)
- Metaxyonycha godmani (Jacoby, 1879)
- Metaxyonycha gounelli Lefèvre, 1891
  - Metaxyonycha gounelli acrospina (Bechyné & Bechyné, 1968)
  - Metaxyonycha gounelli gounelli Lefèvre, 1891
- Metaxyonycha granulata (Germar, 1821)
- Metaxyonycha guttifera (Bechyné, 1955)
  - Metaxyonycha guttifera guttifera (Bechyné, 1955)
  - Metaxyonycha guttifera lepidosoma (Bechyné & Bechyné, 1968)
- Metaxyonycha haroldi (Lefèvre, 1891)
- Metaxyonycha hirsuta Jacoby, 1890
- Metaxyonycha hirtipennis (Jacoby, 1881)
- Metaxyonycha humeralis Marshall, 1864
- Metaxyonycha humilis Marshall, 1864
- Metaxyonycha hybrida (Lefèvre, 1878)
- Metaxyonycha jeanneli (Bechyné, 1951)
- Metaxyonycha jusepinensis (Bechyné & Bechyné, 1968)
- Metaxyonycha lacerdae Lefèvre, 1884
- Metaxyonycha lefevrei (Harold, 1875)
- Metaxyonycha lima (Bechyné, 1955)
- Metaxyonycha limbata (Jacoby, 1890)
- Metaxyonycha longicornis (Bechyné, 1951)
- Metaxyonycha martinezi (Bechyné, 1951)
- Metaxyonycha mattogrossoensis (Scherer, 1964)
- Metaxyonycha medeirosi (Bechyné & Bechyné, 1961)
- Metaxyonycha melanocephala (Bechyné, 1953)
- Metaxyonycha melanogastra (Lefèvre, 1884)
- Metaxyonycha mendesi Bechyné, 1949
  - Metaxyonycha mendesi mendesi Bechyné, 1949
  - Metaxyonycha mendesi zikani (Bechyné, 1953)
- Metaxyonycha minarum (Lefèvre, 1888)
- Metaxyonycha montesi (Bechyné, 1953)
- Metaxyonycha nigritarsis Lefèvre, 1875
  - Metaxyonycha nigritarsis minor (Bechyné, 1953)
  - Metaxyonycha nigritarsis nigritarsis Lefèvre, 1875
- Metaxyonycha ocanana (Lefèvre, 1878)
- Metaxyonycha octosignata Baly, 1881
- Metaxyonycha pallidula (Boheman, 1858)
  - Metaxyonycha pallidula interior (Bechyné, 1958)
  - Metaxyonycha pallidula pallidula (Boheman, 1858)
- Metaxyonycha panamensis Jacoby, 1890
- Metaxyonycha parallela (Bechyné, 1951)
- Metaxyonycha piceola (Bechyné & Bechyné, 1968)
- Metaxyonycha plagiata Lefèvre, 1891
- Metaxyonycha porcata (Germar, 1824)
- Metaxyonycha problematica (Bechyné, 1951)
- Metaxyonycha pulchra (Scherer, 1964)
- Metaxyonycha quadrimaculata (Olivier, 1808)
- Metaxyonycha quadrinotata Marshall, 1864
- Metaxyonycha radioni (Bechyné, 1952)
- Metaxyonycha richteri (Bechyné, 1953)
- Metaxyonycha rosiovittata Bechyné, 1949
  - Metaxyonycha rosiovittata obsoleta (Bechyné & Bechyné, 1968)
  - Metaxyonycha rosiovittata rosiovittata Bechyné, 1949
- Metaxyonycha rugosa Jacoby, 1900
- Metaxyonycha salvini (Jacoby, 1881)
- Metaxyonycha sanguinea Lefèvre, 1878
- Metaxyonycha schinicola (Bechyné, 1958)
- Metaxyonycha seabrai (Bechyné & Bechyné, 1968)
- Metaxyonycha semiocclusa (Bechyné, 1951)
- Metaxyonycha sergipensis (Bechyné & Bechyné, 1968)
- Metaxyonycha signata Lefèvre, 1885
- Metaxyonycha spinifera (Bechyné, 1957)
- Metaxyonycha tarsata Baly, 1881
- Metaxyonycha tejucana Marshall, 1864
- Metaxyonycha tenuenotata (Bechyné, 1950)
- Metaxyonycha testacea (Fabricius, 1801)
- Metaxyonycha tetrasticta Marshall, 1864
- Metaxyonycha tricolor (Perty, 1832)
- Metaxyonycha tridentata Jacoby, 1877
- Metaxyonycha trigonomera (Bechyné & Bechyné, 1968)
- Metaxyonycha validicornis Lefèvre, 1885
- Metaxyonycha variolosa Jacoby, 1890
- Metaxyonycha vianai Bechyné, 1949
- Metaxyonycha vigia (Bechyné & Bechyné, 1961)
- Metaxyonycha violena (Bechyné, 1954)
- Metaxyonycha viridilimbata Lefèvre, 1877
- Metaxyonycha vittulosa (Bechyné, 1951)
- Metaxyonycha weyrauchi (Bechyné, 1950)
  - Metaxyonycha weyrauchi chaparensis (Bechyné, 1951)
  - Metaxyonycha weyrauchi weyrauchi (Bechyné, 1950)

The following species are synonyms:

- Metaxyonycha batesi Baly, 1881: Synonym of Metaxyonycha augusta (Perty, 1832)
- Metaxyonycha formosa Lefèvre, 1883: Synonym of Metaxyonycha augusta (Perty, 1832)
- Metaxyonycha pretiosa Baly, 1881: Synonym of Metaxyonycha augusta (Perty, 1832)
