= Tragocephala freyi =

Scientific classification
- Domain: Eukaryota
- Kingdom: Animalia
- Phylum: Arthropoda
- Class: Insecta
- Order: Coleoptera
- Suborder: Polyphaga
- Infraorder: Cucujiformia
- Family: Cerambycidae
- Genus: Tragocephala
- Species: T. freyi

Binomial name
- Tragocephala freyi Brancsik, 1893

Synonyms
- Tragocephala freyi ab. subnubeculosa Breuning, 1980

Species of beetle

Tragocephala freyi is a species of beetle in the family Cerambycidae. It was described by Brancsik in 1893.

== Varietas ==
- Tragocephala freyi var. oculicollis Fairmaire, 1894
- Tragocephala freyi var. nubeculosa Fairmaire, 1894
