= Tragocephala burgeoni =

Scientific classification
- Kingdom: Animalia
- Phylum: Arthropoda
- Class: Insecta
- Order: Coleoptera
- Suborder: Polyphaga
- Infraorder: Cucujiformia
- Family: Cerambycidae
- Genus: Tragocephala
- Species: T. burgeoni

Binomial name
- Tragocephala burgeoni Breuning, 1938

Species of beetle

Tragocephala burgeoni is a species of beetle in the family Cerambycidae. It was described by Stephan von Breuning in 1938. It is known from the Democratic Republic of the Congo.
