= Platycorynus verschureni =

Scientific classification
- Kingdom: Animalia
- Phylum: Arthropoda
- Clade: Pancrustacea
- Class: Insecta
- Order: Coleoptera
- Suborder: Polyphaga
- Infraorder: Cucujiformia
- Family: Chrysomelidae
- Genus: Platycorynus
- Species: P. verschureni

Binomial name
- Platycorynus verschureni Selman, 1972

Species of beetle

Platycorynus verschureni is a species of leaf beetle of the Democratic Republic of the Congo, described by Selman in 1972.
