= Prionoderita =

Scientific classification
- Kingdom: Animalia
- Phylum: Arthropoda
- Clade: Pancrustacea
- Class: Insecta
- Order: Coleoptera
- Suborder: Polyphaga
- Infraorder: Cucujiformia
- Family: Chrysomelidae
- Subfamily: Eumolpinae
- Tribe: Eumolpini
- Genus: Prionoderita; Flowers, 2004
- Species: P. nixa

Binomial name
- Prionoderita nixa (Bechyné, 1953)

Synonyms
- Prionodera nixa Bechyné, 1953

Genus of leaf beetles from Bolivia

Prionoderita is a genus of leaf beetles in the subfamily Eumolpinae. It is known from Bolivia, and contains only one species, Prionoderita nixa. The genus is named for its resemblance to Prionodera; the Spanish diminutive suffix -ita refers to the small size of P. nixa, which has a length of 6.5 mm.
