= Tragocephala grandis =

Scientific classification
- Domain: Eukaryota
- Kingdom: Animalia
- Phylum: Arthropoda
- Class: Insecta
- Order: Coleoptera
- Suborder: Polyphaga
- Infraorder: Cucujiformia
- Family: Cerambycidae
- Genus: Tragocephala
- Species: T. grandis

Binomial name
- Tragocephala grandis Jordan, 1903

Synonyms
- Tragocephala freyi m. grandis (Jordan) Breuning, 1934

Species of beetle

Tragocephala grandis is a species of beetle in the family Cerambycidae. It was described by Karl Jordan in 1903.
