= Tragocephala pulchra =

Scientific classification
- Domain: Eukaryota
- Kingdom: Animalia
- Phylum: Arthropoda
- Class: Insecta
- Order: Coleoptera
- Suborder: Polyphaga
- Infraorder: Cucujiformia
- Family: Cerambycidae
- Genus: Tragocephala
- Species: T. pulchra

Binomial name
- Tragocephala pulchra (Waterhouse, 1880)

Synonyms
- Tragocephala jucunda m. pulchra (Waterhouse) Breuning, 1934; Rhaphidopsis pulchra Waterhouse, 1880

Species of beetle

Tragocephala pulchra is a species of beetle in the family Cerambycidae. It was described by Frederick George Waterhouse in 1880, originally under the genus Rhaphidopsis. It contains the varietas Tragocephala pulchra var. pauliani.
