= Platycorynus marginalis =

Scientific classification
- Kingdom: Animalia
- Phylum: Arthropoda
- Clade: Pancrustacea
- Class: Insecta
- Order: Coleoptera
- Suborder: Polyphaga
- Infraorder: Cucujiformia
- Family: Chrysomelidae
- Genus: Platycorynus
- Species: P. marginalis

Binomial name
- Platycorynus marginalis (Weise, 1912)

Synonyms
- Corynodes marginalis Weise, 1912

Species of beetle

Platycorynus marginalis is a species of leaf beetle from East Africa and the Democratic Republic of the Congo. It was first described from Uhehe, a region now part of Tanzania, by Julius Weise in 1912.

== Subspecies ==
There are two subspecies of P. marginalis:

- Platycorynus marginalis luluensis (Burgeon, 1940)
- Platycorynus marginalis marginalis (Weise, 1912)
