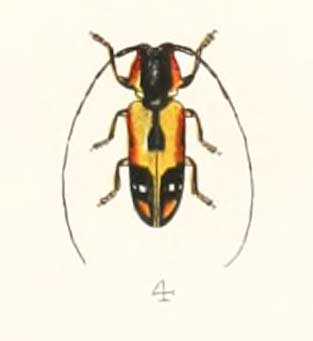

Scientific classification
- Domain: Eukaryota
- Kingdom: Animalia
- Phylum: Arthropoda
- Class: Insecta
- Order: Coleoptera
- Suborder: Polyphaga
- Infraorder: Cucujiformia
- Family: Cerambycidae
- Genus: Tragocephala
- Species: T. mniszechii

Binomial name
- Tragocephala mniszechii Thomson, 1857

Synonyms
- Tragocephala mniszechi Thomson, 1857; Tragocephala mniscechi Thomson, 1857; Tragocephala mniszechi m. allardi Téocchi, 1997; Tragocephala mniscechi m. dargei Téocchi, 1989; Tragocephala mniszechi m. parablutelii Breuning, 1970; Tragocephala mniszechi m. bouyeri Téocchi, Jiroux & Sudre, 2004

= Tragocephala mniszechii =

Species of beetle

Tragocephala mniszechii is a species of beetle in the family Cerambycidae. It was described by James Thomson in 1857. It has a wide distribution in Africa.

== Varietas ==
- Tragocephala mniszechii var. blutelii Buquet, 1857
- Tragocephala mniszechii var. klugii Thomson, 1878
- Tragocephala mniszechii var. basalis Jordan, 1894
- Tragocephala mniszechii var. occidentalis Jordan, 1894
- Tragocephala mniszechii var. timida Duvivier, 1892
