= Platycorynus limbatus =

Scientific classification
- Kingdom: Animalia
- Phylum: Arthropoda
- Clade: Pancrustacea
- Class: Insecta
- Order: Coleoptera
- Suborder: Polyphaga
- Infraorder: Cucujiformia
- Family: Chrysomelidae
- Genus: Platycorynus
- Species: P. limbatus

Binomial name
- Platycorynus limbatus (Baly, 1881)

Synonyms
- Corynodes bimaculicollis Jacoby, 1900; Corynodes hintzi Weise, 1912; Corynodes limbatus Baly, 1881; Corynodes nigripennis Jacoby, 1900; Corynodes plagiatus Weise, 1904; Corynodes rufocastaneus Weise, 1907; Platycorynus limbatus ab. dimidiatus Kuntzen, 1913

Species of beetle

Platycorynus limbatus is a species of leaf beetle from Gabon, the Republic of the Congo and the Democratic Republic of the Congo. It was first described by Joseph Sugar Baly in 1881.

== Subspecies ==
There are two subspecies of P. limbatus:

- Platycorynus limbatus congoensis (Burgeon, 1940)
- Platycorynus limbatus limbatus (Baly, 1881): The nominotypical subspecies.
