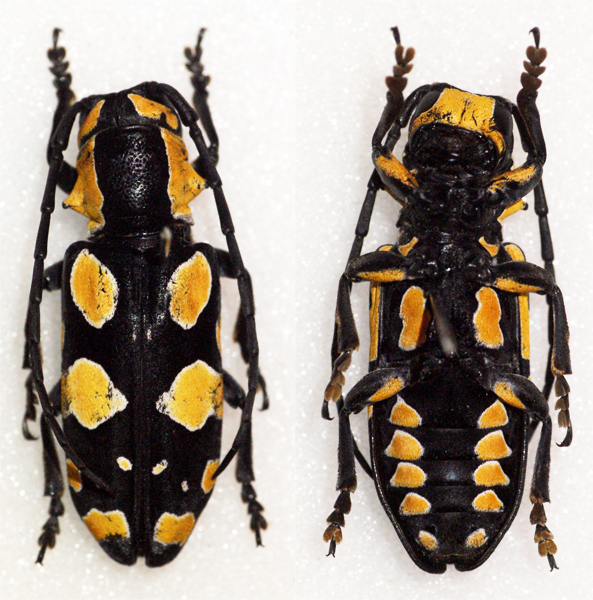

Scientific classification
- Domain: Eukaryota
- Kingdom: Animalia
- Phylum: Arthropoda
- Class: Insecta
- Order: Coleoptera
- Suborder: Polyphaga
- Infraorder: Cucujiformia
- Family: Cerambycidae
- Genus: Tragocephala
- Species: T. pretiosa

Binomial name
- Tragocephala pretiosa Hintz, 1909

Synonyms
- Tragocephala nobilis m. pretiosa (Hintz) Breuning, 1934; Tragocephala mixta m. minettii Téocchi, 1991; Tragocephala pretiosa m. snizeki Téocchi, 1999

= Tragocephala pretiosa =

Species of beetle

Tragocephala pretiosa is a species of beetle in the family Cerambycidae. It was described by Hintz in 1909. It is known from Tanzania, Malawi, Kenya, and Zambia.

== Varietas ==
- Tragocephala pretiosa var. mixta Breuning, 1934
- Tragocephala pretiosa var. kulzeri Breuning, 1934
