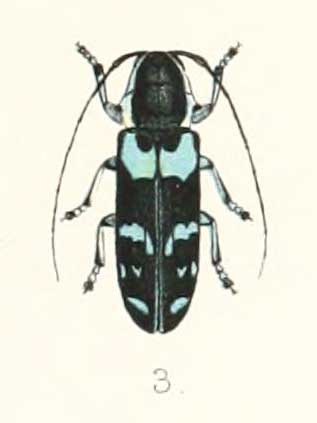

Scientific classification
- Domain: Eukaryota
- Kingdom: Animalia
- Phylum: Arthropoda
- Class: Insecta
- Order: Coleoptera
- Suborder: Polyphaga
- Infraorder: Cucujiformia
- Family: Cerambycidae
- Genus: Tragocephala
- Species: T. caerulescens

Binomial name
- Tragocephala caerulescens Jordan, 1894

Synonyms
- Tragocephala nobilis ab. coerulescens Jordan, 1894

= Tragocephala caerulescens =

Species of beetle

Tragocephala caerulescens is a species of beetle in the family Cerambycidae. It was described by Karl Jordan in 1894. It is known from Gabon, Chad, the Democratic Republic of the Congo, Cameroon, and Senegal.

== Varieties ==
- Tragocephala caerulescens var. plagiata Aurivillius, 1927
- Tragocephala caerulescens var. gorilloides Aurivillius, 1927
