= Tragocephala gracillima =

Scientific classification
- Kingdom: Animalia
- Phylum: Arthropoda
- Class: Insecta
- Order: Coleoptera
- Suborder: Polyphaga
- Infraorder: Cucujiformia
- Family: Cerambycidae
- Genus: Tragocephala
- Species: T. gracillima

Binomial name
- Tragocephala gracillima Breuning, 1934

Species of beetle

Tragocephala gracillima is a species of beetle in the family Cerambycidae. It was described by Stephan von Breuning in 1934.
