= Tragocephala ducalis =

Scientific classification
- Domain: Eukaryota
- Kingdom: Animalia
- Phylum: Arthropoda
- Class: Insecta
- Order: Coleoptera
- Suborder: Polyphaga
- Infraorder: Cucujiformia
- Family: Cerambycidae
- Genus: Tragocephala
- Species: T. ducalis

Binomial name
- Tragocephala ducalis White, 1856

Synonyms
- Tragocephala boerensis Thomson, 1857

Species of beetle

Tragocephala ducalis is a species of beetle in the family Cerambycidae. It was described by White in 1856. It is known from South Africa.

== Varietas ==
- Tragocephala ducalis var. confluentina Breuning, 1934
- Tragocephala ducalis var. chloe Thomson, 1865
- Tragocephala ducalis var. grisea Jordan, 1894
- Tragocephala ducalis var. frenata Gerstäcker, 1855
- Tragocephala ducalis var. rikatlae Peringuey, 1896
