= Tragocephala phidias =

Scientific classification
- Domain: Eukaryota
- Kingdom: Animalia
- Phylum: Arthropoda
- Class: Insecta
- Order: Coleoptera
- Suborder: Polyphaga
- Infraorder: Cucujiformia
- Family: Cerambycidae
- Genus: Tragocephala
- Species: T. phidias

Binomial name
- Tragocephala phidias Jordan, 1894

Synonyms
- Tragocephala rohdei m. phidias (Jordan) Breuning, 1934

Species of beetle

Tragocephala phidias is a species of beetle in the family Cerambycidae. It was described by Karl Jordan in 1894. It is known from the Democratic Republic of the Congo, Cameroon, and Gabon. It contains the variety Tragocephala phidias var. rohdei.
