= Tragocephala cuneifera =

Scientific classification
- Domain: Eukaryota
- Kingdom: Animalia
- Phylum: Arthropoda
- Class: Insecta
- Order: Coleoptera
- Suborder: Polyphaga
- Infraorder: Cucujiformia
- Family: Cerambycidae
- Genus: Tragocephala
- Species: T. cuneifera

Binomial name
- Tragocephala cuneifera Aurivillius, 1914

Species of beetle

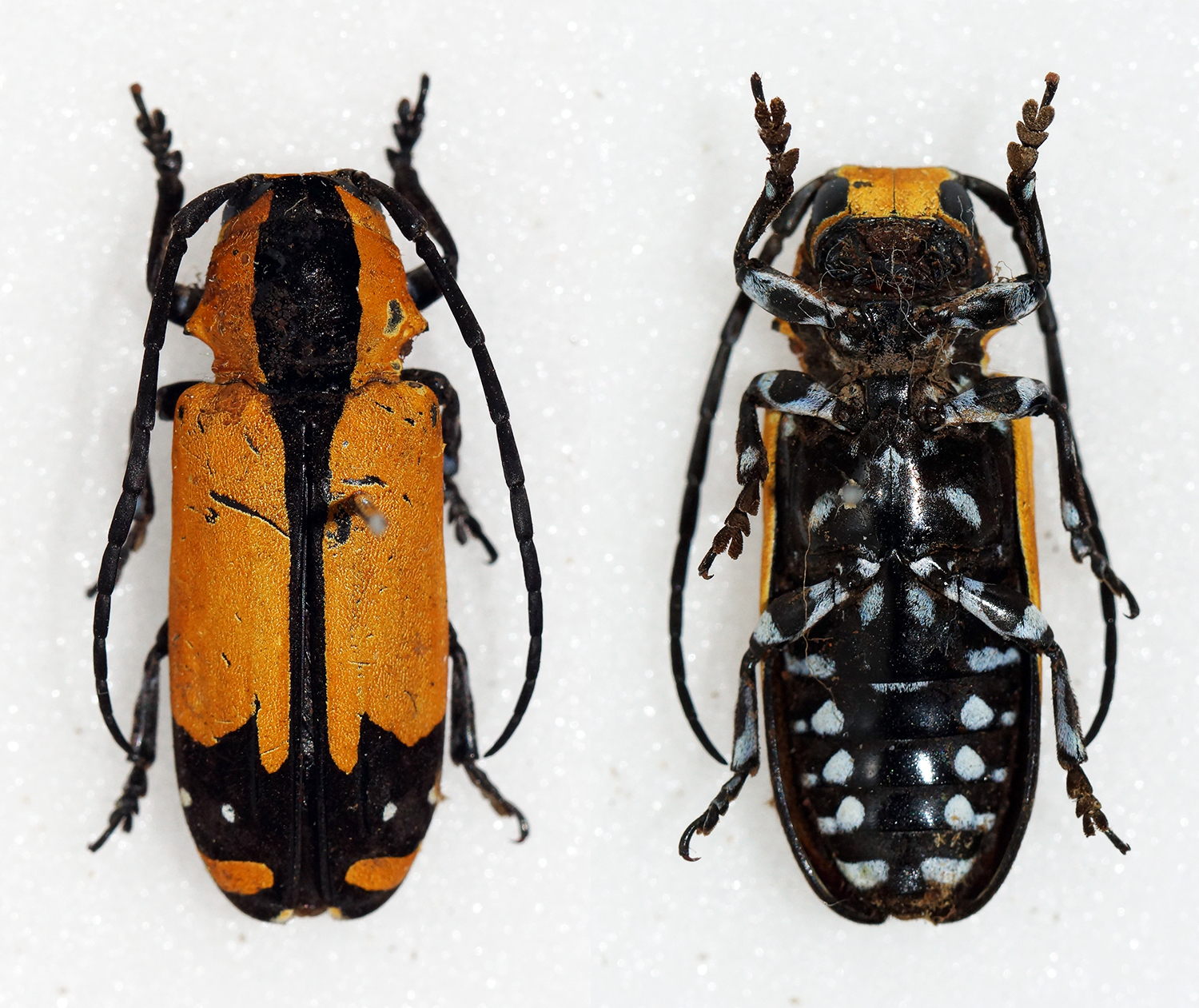
Tragocephala cuneifera

Tragocephala cuneifera is a species of beetle in the family Cerambycidae. It was described by Per Olof Christopher Aurivillius in 1914. It is known from Angola.
