= Tragocephala castelnaudi =

Scientific classification
- Domain: Eukaryota
- Kingdom: Animalia
- Phylum: Arthropoda
- Class: Insecta
- Order: Coleoptera
- Suborder: Polyphaga
- Infraorder: Cucujiformia
- Family: Cerambycidae
- Genus: Tragocephala
- Species: T. castelnaudi

Binomial name
- Tragocephala castelnaudi Thomson, 1868

Synonyms
- Tragocephala mocquerysi Jordan, 1894; Tragocephala nobilis m. conjuncta Breuning, 1934; Tragocephala nobilis m. castelnaudi (Thomson) Breuning, 1934

Species of beetle

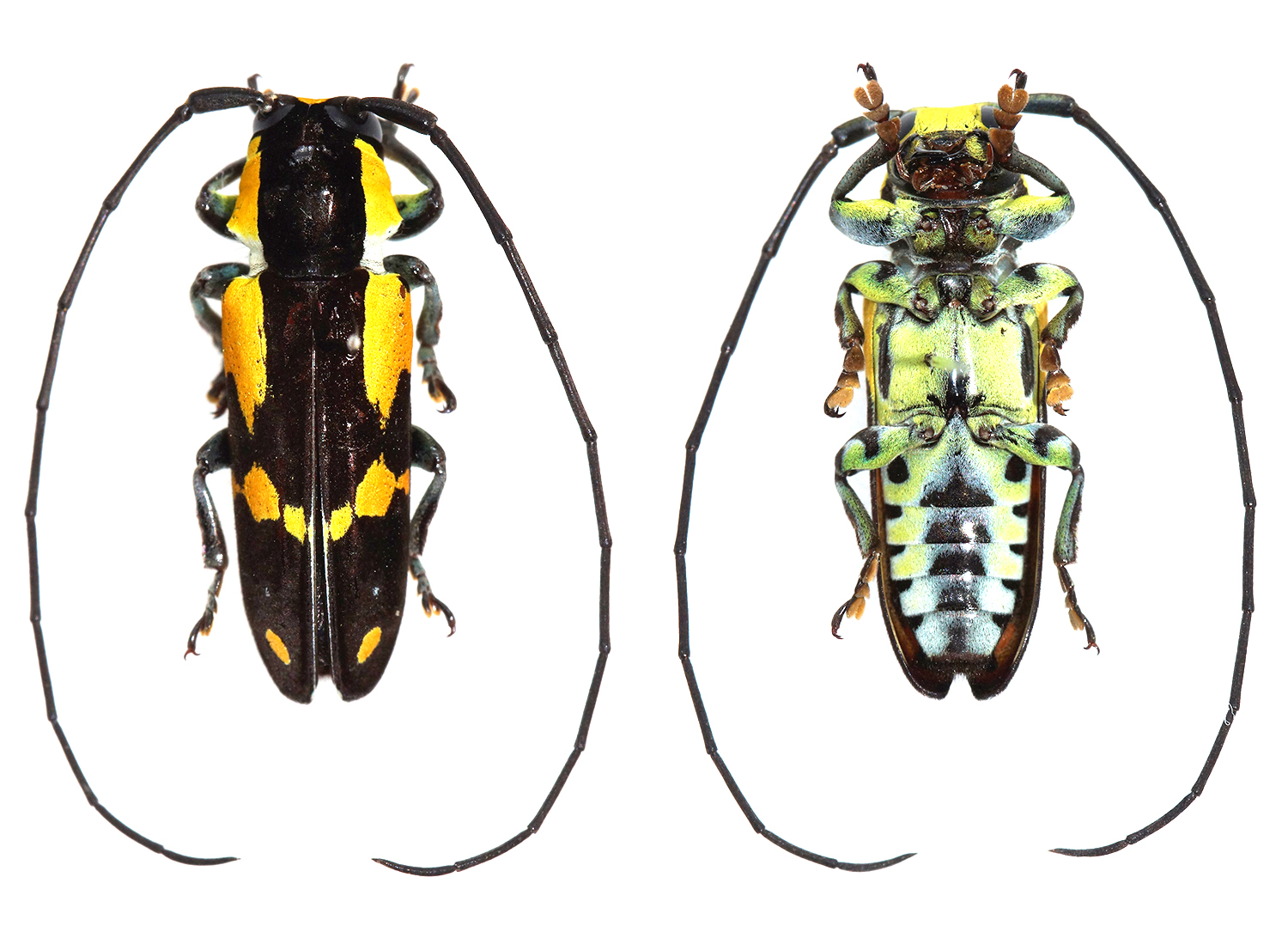
Tragocephala castelnaudii

Tragocephala castelnaudi is a species of beetle in the family Cerambycidae. It was described by James Thomson in 1868. It is known from Gabon.
