= Tragocephala descarpentriesi =

Scientific classification
- Kingdom: Animalia
- Phylum: Arthropoda
- Class: Insecta
- Order: Coleoptera
- Suborder: Polyphaga
- Infraorder: Cucujiformia
- Family: Cerambycidae
- Genus: Tragocephala
- Species: T. descarpentriesi

Binomial name
- Tragocephala descarpentriesi Lepesme & Breuning, 1950

Species of beetle

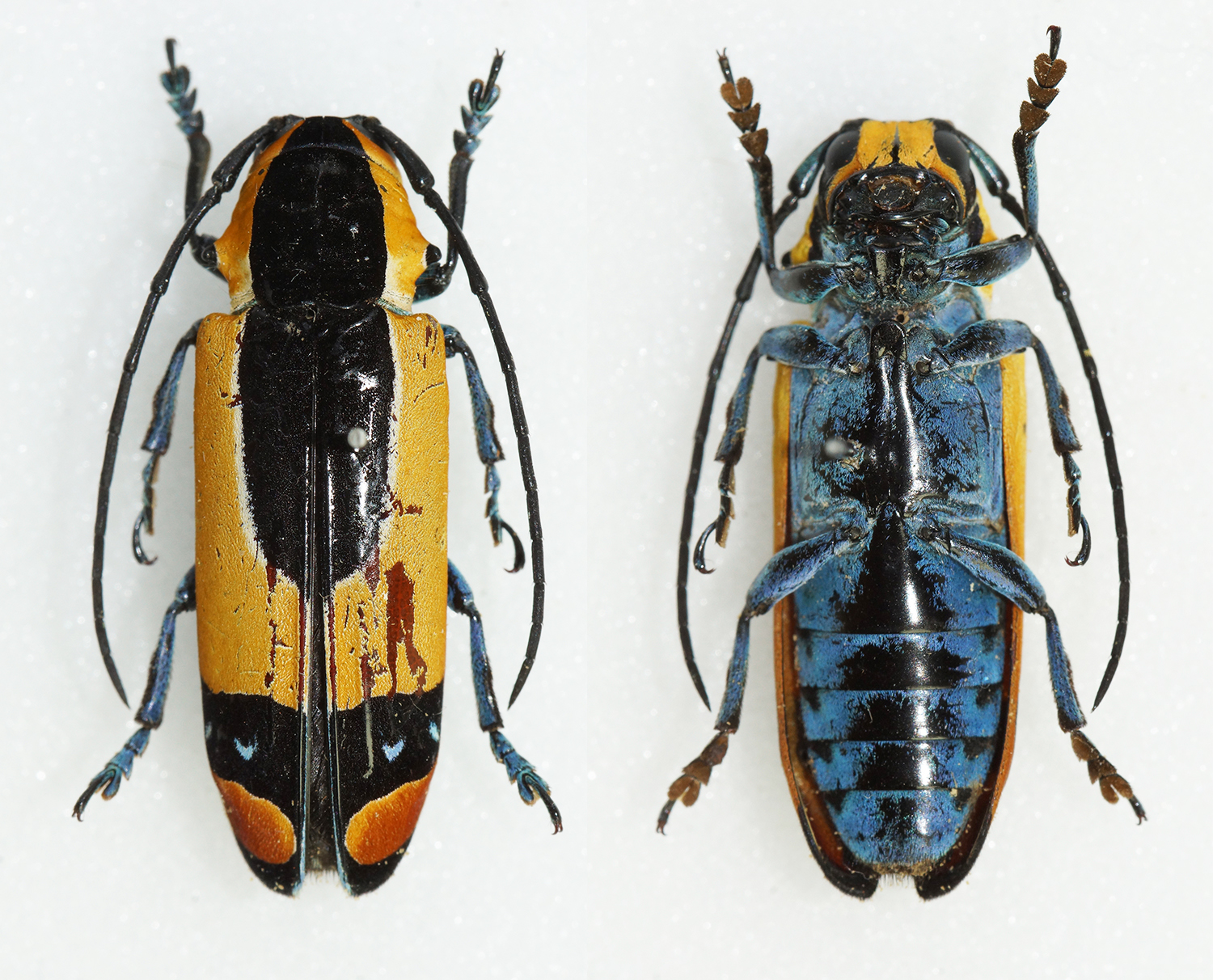
Tragocephala descarpentriesi

Tragocephala descarpentriesi is a species of beetle in the family Cerambycidae. It was described by Lepesme and Stephan von Breuning in 1950.
