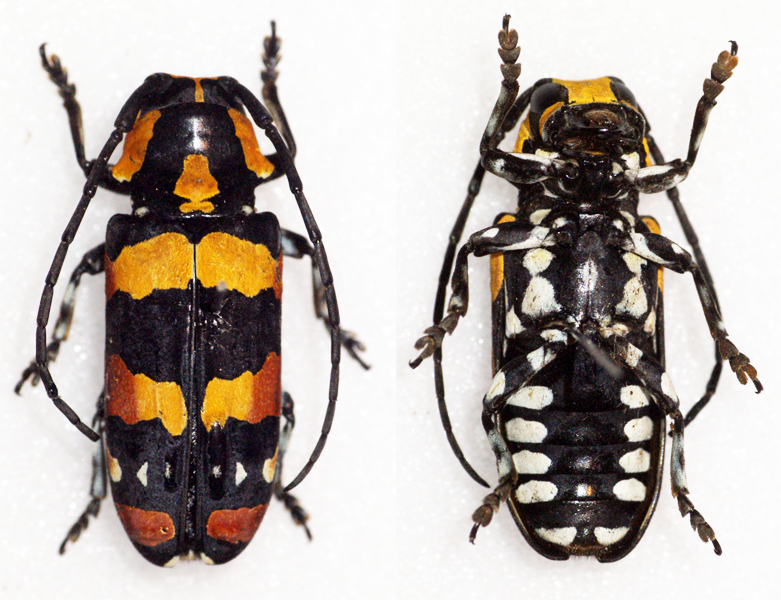

Scientific classification
- Domain: Eukaryota
- Kingdom: Animalia
- Phylum: Arthropoda
- Class: Insecta
- Order: Coleoptera
- Suborder: Polyphaga
- Infraorder: Cucujiformia
- Family: Cerambycidae
- Genus: Tragocephala
- Species: T. mima

Binomial name
- Tragocephala mima Thomson, 1878

Synonyms
- Tragocephala zanzibarica Thomson, 1878; Tragocephala bradshavi Peringuey, 1885; Tragocephala mima m. ferreroi Teocchi, 1992; Tragocephala mima m. bopprei Teocchi, 1992

= Tragocephala mima =

Species of beetle

Tragocephala mima is a species of beetle in the family Cerambycidae. It was described by James Thomson in 1878. It is known from Tanzania, Malawi, Zambia, Mozambique, Kenya, and Zimbabwe.
