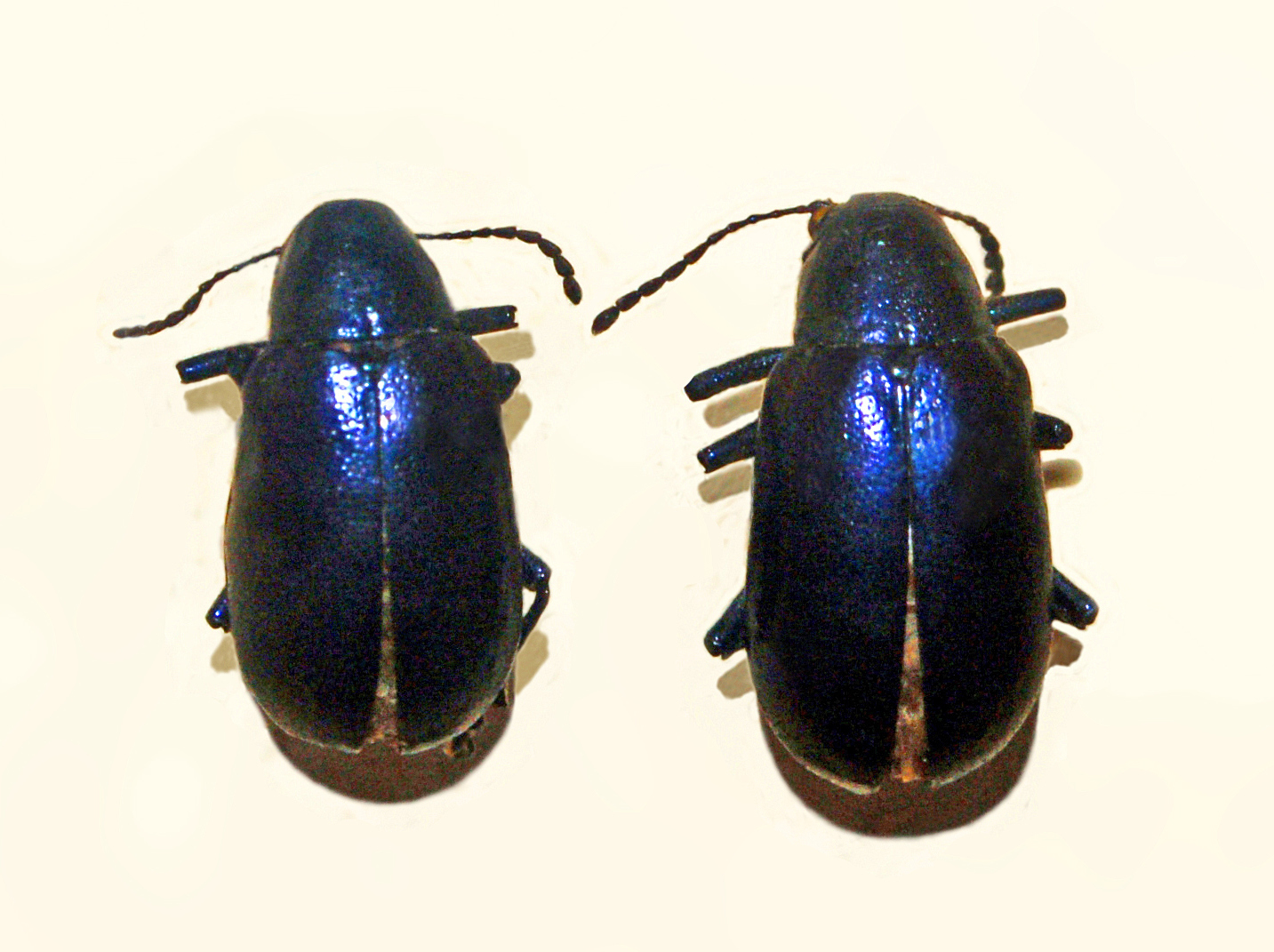
- Platycorynus compressicornis from Ethiopia

Scientific classification
- Kingdom: Animalia
- Phylum: Arthropoda
- Clade: Pancrustacea
- Class: Insecta
- Order: Coleoptera
- Suborder: Polyphaga
- Infraorder: Cucujiformia
- Family: Chrysomelidae
- Genus: Platycorynus
- Species: P. compressicornis

Binomial name
- Platycorynus compressicornis (Fabricius, 1801)

Synonyms
- Eumolpus compressicornis Fabricius, 1801; Eumolpus senegalensis Olivier, 1808; Corynodes caerulescens Fairmaire, 1885; Corynodes bonnyi Gahan, 1892; Corynodes varicolor Jacoby, 1901; Corynodes emeraldinus Clavareau, 1912; Corynodes compressicornis ab. clavareaui Kuntzen, 1913; Corynodes compressicornis ab. claricollis Kuntzen, 1913; Corynodes compressicornis ab. exsul Kuntzen, 1913

= Platycorynus compressicornis =

Species of beetle

Platycorynus compressicornis is a species of beetles belonging to the Chrysomelidae family. This species can be found in tropical Africa.

== Distribution ==
P. compressicornis is distributed throughout west, central and east Africa, including the Congo. It is found on bushes at the edge of dense gallery forest.
