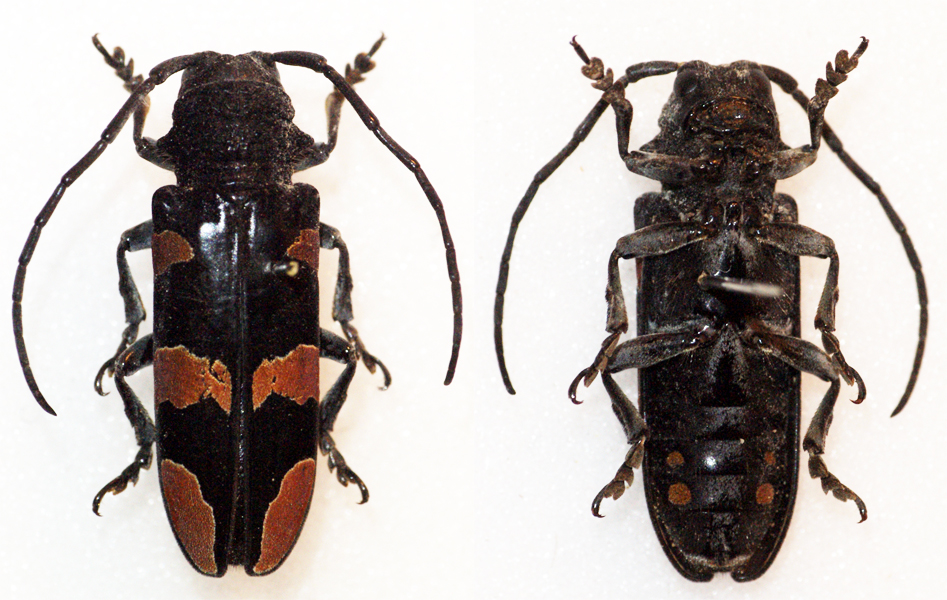

Scientific classification
- Domain: Eukaryota
- Kingdom: Animalia
- Phylum: Arthropoda
- Class: Insecta
- Order: Coleoptera
- Suborder: Polyphaga
- Infraorder: Cucujiformia
- Family: Cerambycidae
- Genus: Tragocephala
- Species: T. morio

Binomial name
- Tragocephala morio Jordan, 1903

Synonyms
- Tragocephala nyassica Hintz, 1909; Tragocephala morio m. itzingeriana Breuning, 1934

= Tragocephala morio =

Species of beetle

Tragocephala morio is a species of beetle in the family Cerambycidae. It was described by Karl Jordan in 1903. It is known from Tanzania and Malawi.
