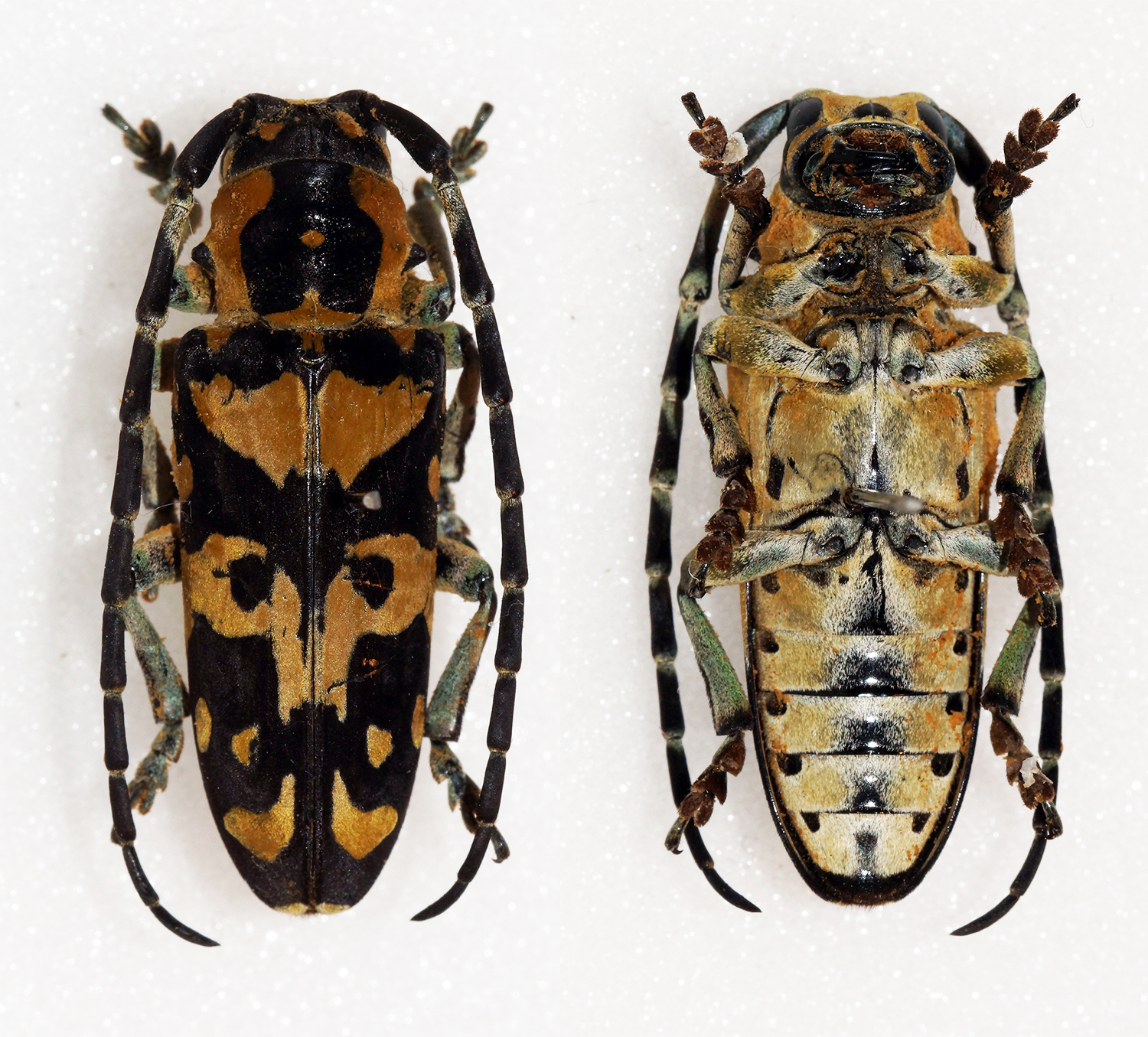

Scientific classification
- Domain: Eukaryota
- Kingdom: Animalia
- Phylum: Arthropoda
- Class: Insecta
- Order: Coleoptera
- Suborder: Polyphaga
- Infraorder: Cucujiformia
- Family: Cerambycidae
- Genus: Tragocephala
- Species: T. crassicornis

Binomial name
- Tragocephala crassicornis Jordan, 1903

Synonyms
- Tragocephala freyi ab. oculicollis (Fairmaire) Breuning, 1934

= Tragocephala crassicornis =

Species of beetle

Tragocephala crassicornis is a species of beetle in the family Cerambycidae. It was described by Karl Jordan in 1903.

== Varieties ==
- Tragocephala crassicornis var. ochrescens Breuning, 1934
- Tragocephala crassicornis var. grandidieri Breuning, 1934
