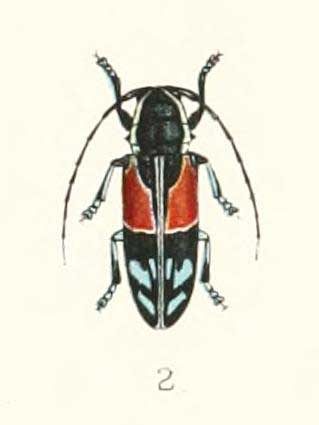

Scientific classification
- Domain: Eukaryota
- Kingdom: Animalia
- Phylum: Arthropoda
- Class: Insecta
- Order: Coleoptera
- Suborder: Polyphaga
- Infraorder: Cucujiformia
- Family: Cerambycidae
- Genus: Tragocephala
- Species: T. guerinii

Binomial name
- Tragocephala guerinii White, 1856

Synonyms
- Tragocephala guerini White, 1856; Tragocephala guerini m. latevitatta Teocchi, 1989

= Tragocephala guerinii =

Species of beetle

Tragocephala guerinii is a species of beetle in the family Cerambycidae. It was described by White in 1856. It has a wide distribution in Africa. It feeds on Calliandra houstoniana var. calothyrsus and Theobroma cacao.

== Varietas ==
- Tragocephala guerinii var. buquetii Thomson, 1857
- Tragocephala guerinii var. aurivilliusi Plavilstshikov, 1927
- Tragocephala guerinii var. jordani Breuning, 1934
- Tragocephala guerinii var. irregularis Aurivillius, 1913
- Tragocephala guerinii var. senatoria Chevrolat, 1858
- Tragocephala guerinii var. dilatata Aurivillius, 1913
