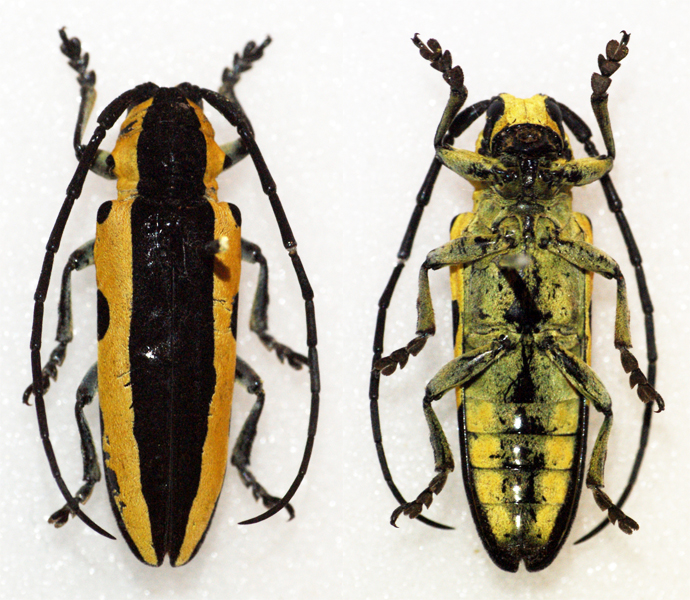

Scientific classification
- Kingdom: Animalia
- Phylum: Arthropoda
- Class: Insecta
- Order: Coleoptera
- Suborder: Polyphaga
- Infraorder: Cucujiformia
- Family: Cerambycidae
- Genus: Tragocephala
- Species: T. univittipennis

Binomial name
- Tragocephala univittipennis Breuning, 1974

= Tragocephala univittipennis =

Species of beetle

Tragocephala univittipennis is a species of beetle in the family Cerambycidae. It was described by Stephan von Breuning in 1974. It is known from Tanzania. It measures between 23 and 27 mm (0.91 and 1.06 in).
