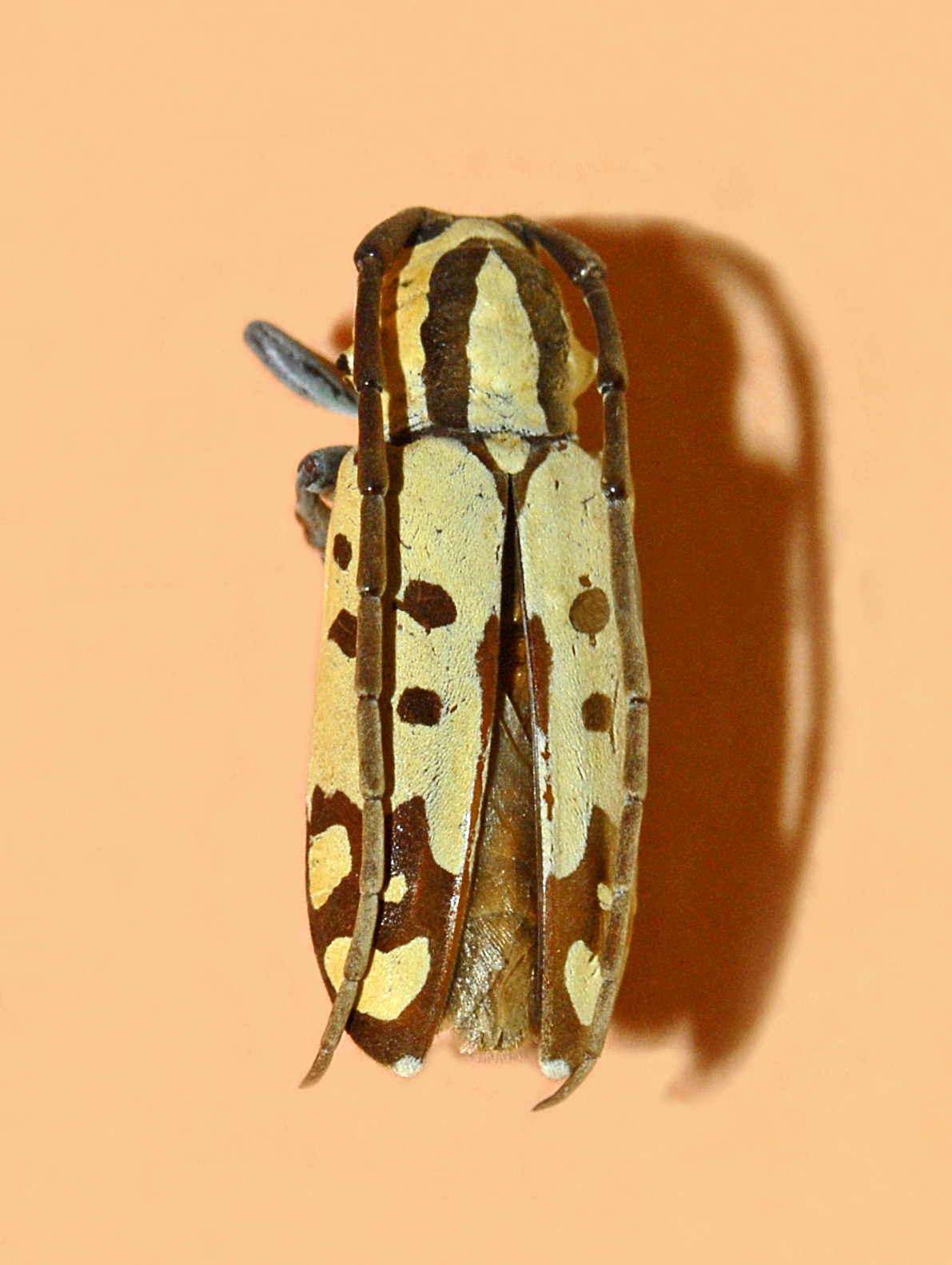
- Museum specimen of Tragocephala variegata

Scientific classification
- Domain: Eukaryota
- Kingdom: Animalia
- Phylum: Arthropoda
- Class: Insecta
- Order: Coleoptera
- Suborder: Polyphaga
- Infraorder: Cucujiformia
- Family: Cerambycidae
- Tribe: Tragocephalini
- Genus: Tragocephala; Laporte de Castelnau, 1840

= Tragocephala =

Genus of beetles

Tragocephala is a genus of flat-faced longhorn beetles belonging to the family Cerambycidae.

== Species ==
- Tragocephala alluaudi Lameere, 1893
- Tragocephala angolensis Aurivillius, 1916
- Tragocephala berchmansi Hintz, 1909
- Tragocephala burgeoni Breuning, 1938
- Tragocephala caerulescens Jordan, 1894
- Tragocephala carbonaria Lameere, 1892
- Tragocephala castelnaudi Thomson, 1868
- Tragocephala castnia Thomson, 1857
- Tragocephala crassicornis Jordan, 1903
- Tragocephala cuneifera Aurivillius, 1914
- Tragocephala descarpentriesi Lepesme & Breuning, 1950
- Tragocephala ducalis White, 1856
- Tragocephala formosa (Olivier, 1792)
- Tragocephala freyi Brancsik, 1893
- Tragocephala gorilla Thomson, 1857
- Tragocephala gracillima Breuning, 1934
- Tragocephala grandis Jordan, 1903
- Tragocephala guerinii White, 1856
- Tragocephala jucunda (Gory, 1835)
- Tragocephala mima Thomson, 1878
- Tragocephala mniszechii Thomson, 1857
- Tragocephala morio Jordan, 1903
- Tragocephala nigroapicalis Breuning, 1938
- Tragocephala nobilis (Fabricius, 1787)
- Tragocephala phidias Jordan, 1894
- Tragocephala pretiosa Hintz, 1909
- Tragocephala pulchra (Waterhouse, 1880)
- Tragocephala suturalis Jordan, 1903
- Tragocephala tournieri Lepesme & Breuning, 1950
- Tragocephala univittipennis Breuning, 1974
- Tragocephala variegata Bertoloni, 1849
- Tragocephala viridipes Breuning, 1947
