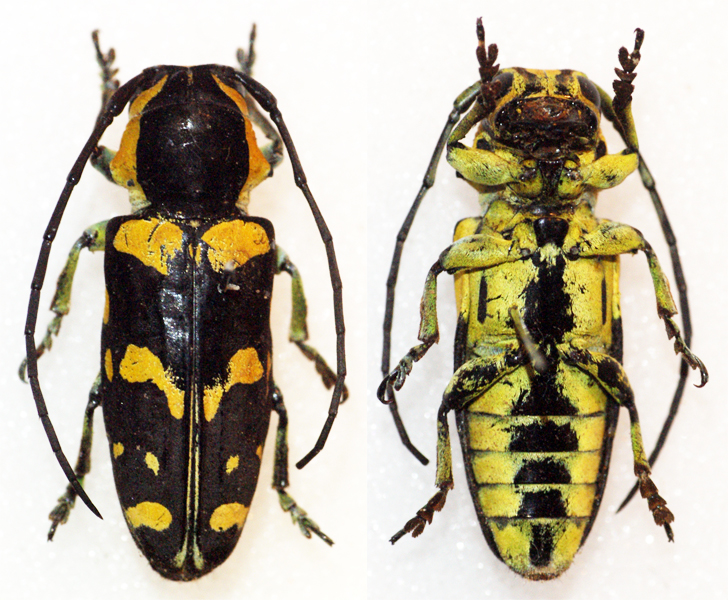

Scientific classification
- Kingdom: Animalia
- Phylum: Arthropoda
- Clade: Pancrustacea
- Class: Insecta
- Order: Coleoptera
- Suborder: Polyphaga
- Infraorder: Cucujiformia
- Family: Cerambycidae
- Genus: Tragocephala
- Species: T. nobilis

Binomial name
- Tragocephala nobilis (Fabricius, 1787)

Synonyms
- Lamia nobilis Fabricius, 1787; Cerambyx nobilis (Fabricius) Gmelin, 1790; Tragocephala nobilis m. postnigra Breuning, 1967; Tragocephala nobilis m. duploconnata Breuning, 1966; Tragocephala nobilis m. rufescens Breuning, 1967; Saperda laeta Fabricius, 1801

= Tragocephala nobilis =

Species of beetle

Tragocephala nobilis is a species of beetle in the family Cerambycidae. It was described by Johan Christian Fabricius in 1787, originally under the genus Lamia. It has a wide distribution in Africa. It feeds on Coffea arabica. It is preyed on by the parasitic wasp Aprostocetus lamiicidus, and the parasitic fly Billaea vanemdeni.

== Varietas ==
- Tragocephala nobilis var. bifasciata Baguena Corella, 1952
- Tragocephala nobilis var. fasciata Kolbe, 1893
- Tragocephala nobilis var. chloris Chevrolat, 1858
- Tragocephala nobilis var. diamenta Gilmour, 1956
- Tragocephala nobilis var. fuscovelutina Fairmaire, 1893
- Tragocephala nobilis var. basosuturalis Gilmour, 1956
- Tragocephala nobilis var. galathea Chevrolat, 1855
- Tragocephala nobilis var. fontanai Baguena, 1942
