= Tragocephala angolensis =

Scientific classification
- Domain: Eukaryota
- Kingdom: Animalia
- Phylum: Arthropoda
- Class: Insecta
- Order: Coleoptera
- Suborder: Polyphaga
- Infraorder: Cucujiformia
- Family: Cerambycidae
- Genus: Tragocephala
- Species: T. angolensis

Binomial name
- Tragocephala angolensis Aurivillius, 1916

Species of beetle

Tragocephala angolensis is a species of beetle in the family Cerambycidae. It was described by Per Olof Christopher Aurivillius in 1916. It is known from Angola. It contains the varietas Tragocephala angolensis var. flavotecta.
