= Tragocephala berchmansi =

Scientific classification
- Domain: Eukaryota
- Kingdom: Animalia
- Phylum: Arthropoda
- Class: Insecta
- Order: Coleoptera
- Suborder: Polyphaga
- Infraorder: Cucujiformia
- Family: Cerambycidae
- Genus: Tragocephala
- Species: T. berchmansi

Binomial name
- Tragocephala berchmansi Hintz, 1909

Species of beetle

Tragocephala berchmansi is a species of beetle in the family Cerambycidae. It was described by Hintz in 1909.

== Varietas ==
- Tragocephala berchmansi var. postmaculata Breuning, 1954
- Tragocephala berchmansi var. conjunctevittata Breuning, 1954
