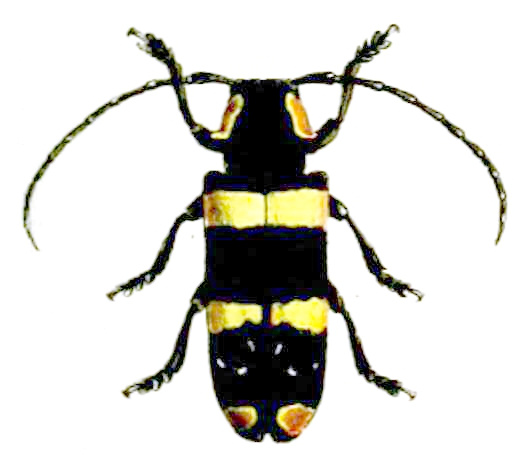

Scientific classification
- Kingdom: Animalia
- Phylum: Arthropoda
- Clade: Pancrustacea
- Class: Insecta
- Order: Coleoptera
- Suborder: Polyphaga
- Infraorder: Cucujiformia
- Family: Cerambycidae
- Genus: Tragocephala
- Species: T. formosa

Binomial name
- Tragocephala formosa (Olivier, 1792)

Synonyms
- Lamia formosa Olivier, 1792; Cerambyx formosus (Olivier) Olivier, 1795; Tragocephala daphnis Thomson, 1865

= Tragocephala formosa =

Species of beetle

Tragocephala formosa is a species of beetle in the family Cerambycidae. It was described by Guillaume-Antoine Olivier in 1792, originally under the genus Lamia. It is known from Mozambique, South Africa, Malawi, Kenya, and Zimbabwe, and has been introduced into Seychelles.

== Varietas ==
- Tragocephala formosa var. gemina Distant, 1904
- Tragocephala formosa var. comitessa White, 1856
- Tragocephala formosa var. thomsoni Aurivillius, 1921
- Tragocephala formosa var. praetoria Chevrolat, 1858
