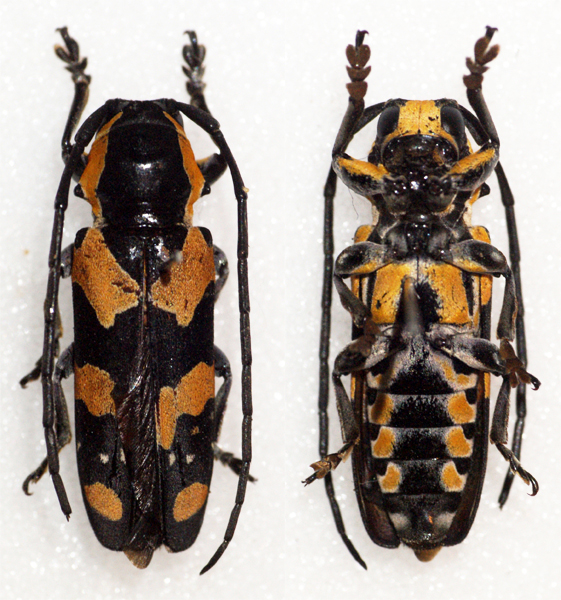
- Tragocephala castnia

Scientific classification
- Domain: Eukaryota
- Kingdom: Animalia
- Phylum: Arthropoda
- Class: Insecta
- Order: Coleoptera
- Suborder: Polyphaga
- Infraorder: Cucujiformia
- Family: Cerambycidae
- Genus: Tragocephala
- Species: T. castnia

Binomial name
- Tragocephala castnia Thomson, 1857

Synonyms
- Tragocephala nobilis m. castnia (Thomson) Breuning, 1934

= Tragocephala castnia =

Species of beetle

Tragocephala castnia is a species of beetle in the family Cerambycidae. It was described by James Thomson in 1857. It has a wide distribution in Africa. It feeds on Theobroma cacao.

== Subspecies ==
- Tragocephala castnia castnia Thomson, 1857
- Tragocephala castnia castniopsis Entwistle, 1963
- Tragocephala castnia cacaoensis Entwistle, 1963
- Tragocephala castnia islandica Entwistle, 1963
- Tragocephala castnia theobromae Entwistle, 1963
- Tragocephala castnia gorillaformis Entwistle, 1963
- Tragocephala castnia leonensis Thomson, 1878
