= Platycorynus cribratellus =

Scientific classification
- Kingdom: Animalia
- Phylum: Arthropoda
- Clade: Pancrustacea
- Class: Insecta
- Order: Coleoptera
- Suborder: Polyphaga
- Infraorder: Cucujiformia
- Family: Chrysomelidae
- Genus: Platycorynus
- Species: P. cribratellus

Binomial name
- Platycorynus cribratellus (Fairmaire, 1885)

Synonyms
- Corynodes cribratellus Fairmaire, 1885

Species of beetle

Platycorynus cribratellus is a species of leaf beetle. It is distributed in Uganda, Kenya, Ethiopia, South Sudan, the Central African Republic and the Democratic Republic of the Congo. It was described by Léon Fairmaire in 1885.
