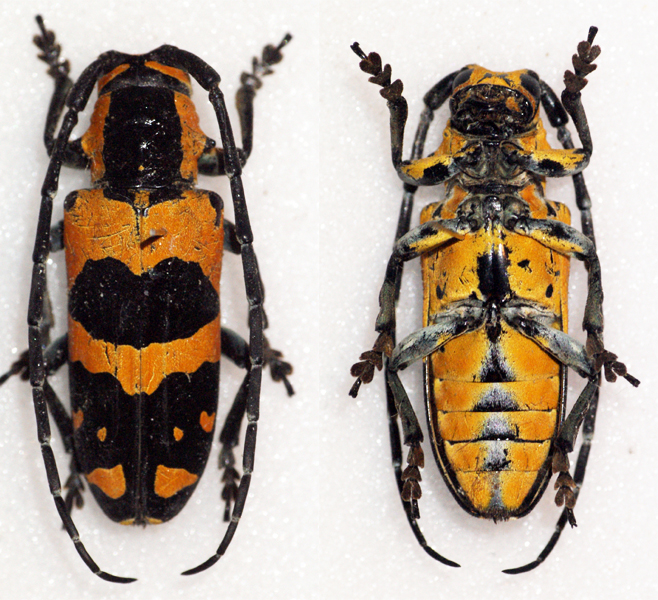

Scientific classification
- Domain: Eukaryota
- Kingdom: Animalia
- Phylum: Arthropoda
- Class: Insecta
- Order: Coleoptera
- Suborder: Polyphaga
- Infraorder: Cucujiformia
- Family: Cerambycidae
- Genus: Tragocephala
- Species: T. jucunda

Binomial name
- Tragocephala jucunda (Gory, 1835)

Synonyms
- Lamia jucunda Gory, 1835

= Tragocephala jucunda =

Species of beetle

Tragocephala jucunda is a species of beetle in the family Cerambycidae. It was described by Gory in 1835, originally under the genus Lamia. It is known from South Africa and Madagascar.

== Varietas ==
- Tragocephala jucunda var. jo Thomson, 1879
- Tragocephala jucunda var. fascicollis Breuning, 1957
- Tragocephala jucunda var. biplagiata Fairmaire, 1903
- Tragocephala jucunda var. kuenckeli Aurivillius, 1921
- Tragocephala jucunda var. heteroclita Thomson, 1857
- Tragocephala jucunda var. ochreata Fairmaire, 1894
- Tragocephala jucunda var. luctifera Fairmaire, 1905
- Tragocephala jucunda var. madagascariensis Künckel, 1890
- Tragocephala jucunda var. perrieri Fairmaire, 1903
