= Giuseppe Bertoloni =

Italian entomologist (1804–1874)

Giuseppe Bertoloni (16 September 1804, in Sarzana – 19 December 1874, in Bologna) was an Italian botanist and entomologist.

He was professor of botany in the University of Bologna which conserves his collections in the University Museum. Bertoloni worked especially on the flora and fauna of Mozambique. He was a member of La Società Entomologica Italiana.

His father Antonio (1775-1869) was a physician and botanist in Bologna.

== Publications ==
Partial list

- "Descriptio novae speciai e Coleoptorum ordine". Novi Comment. Acad. Scient. Inst. Boniensis. 3: 83. 1839.
- "De Botyde silaceali, deque damno, quo afficit Cannabin sativam L." Novi Comment. Acad. Scient. Inst. Boniensis. 6: 91. 1844.
- "De duobus insectis Ulmo campestri, et Pyro Malo infensis". Novi Comment. Acad. Scient. Inst. Boniensis. 6: 459. 1844.
- "Historia Lepidopterorum agri Bononiensis". Novi Comment. Acad. Scient. Inst. Boniensis. 7: 205. 1844.
- "Historia Lepidopterorum agri Bononiensis". Novi Comment. Acad. Scient. Inst. Boniensis. 8: 105. 1846.
- "Historia Lepidopterorum agri Bononiensis". Novi Comment. Acad. Scient. Inst. Boniensis. 9: 97. 1849.
- "Illustratio rerum naturalium Mozambici. Dissertatio I. De Coleopteris". Novi Comment. Acad. Scient. Inst. Boniensis. 10: 381. 1849.
- "Illustratio rerum naturalium Mozambici. Dissertatio II. De Coleopteris". Novi Comment. Acad. Scient. Inst. Boniensis. 10: 407. 1849.
- "Illustratio rerum naturalium Mozambici. Dissertatio III. De Coleopteris". Novi Comment. Acad. Scient. Inst. Boniensis. 10: 423. 1849.
- Illustrazione dei prodotti naturali del Mozambico. Academia delle scienze dell'instituto de Bologna. Dissertazione 4: 343-363 (1852)
- Coleoptera nova Mozambicana. Rendiconto delle sezione delle R. Academia delle scienze dell'instituto di Bologna 1855: 51-53 (1855)
- Illustratio rerum naturalium Mozambici. Coleoptera. Dissertatio 5. Memorie delle Academie delle scienze dell'instituto di Bologna. Memorie della sezione delle scienze naturali 1855 (1855)

He also published extensively in the Bolognese journal Nuovi annali delle scienze naturali (1834-1854).
