= Thomas Ansell Marshall =

English cleric and entomologist (1827–1903)

Thomas Ansell Marshall (18 March 1827 – 11 April 1903) was an English cleric and entomologist, mainly interested in Hymenoptera. He was the son of Thomas Marshall, one of the original members of the Royal Entomological Society of London.

== Works ==
- 1870 Ichneumonidium Brittanicorum Catalogus. London
- 1872 A catalogue of British Hymenoptera; Chrysididae, Ichneumonidae, Braconidae and Evaniidae. London.
- 1873 A catalogue of British Hymenoptera; Oxyura. Entomological Society of London, London..
- 1874. Hymenoptera. New British species, corrections of nomenclature, etc. (Cynipidae, Ichneumonidae, Braconidae, and Oxyura). Entomologists Annual 1874: 114–146.
- 1904 with Jean Jacques Kieffer Proctotrupidae. Species des Hymenopteres d'Europe et d'Algerie. Vol. 9.

Together with very numerous short papers, mainly in the Entomologist's Monthly Magazine, and one on Hymenoptera from Venezuela in the Bulletin Societe Entomologique de France. Two of the papers are on Hymenoptera from Lapland and Spitzbergen.

== Collections ==
Braconidae, Chalcididae, Proctotrupidae, Ichneumonidae und Tenthredinidae are in the Natural History Museum, London and the Hungarian Natural History Museum in Budapest. There are, in addition some British Diptera in the University of Nottingham.
