= Thysbina =

Scientific classification
- Kingdom: Animalia
- Phylum: Arthropoda
- Clade: Pancrustacea
- Class: Insecta
- Order: Coleoptera
- Suborder: Polyphaga
- Infraorder: Cucujiformia
- Family: Chrysomelidae
- Subfamily: Eumolpinae
- Tribe: Euryopini
- Genus: Thysbina; Weise, 1902

Genus of leaf beetles from Africa

Thysbina is a genus of leaf beetles in the subfamily Eumolpinae. It is found in Africa. It was first established by the German entomologist Julius Weise in 1902, for several species from Colasposoma as well as three new species. According to Louis Burgeon in 1941, Thysbina is actually a synonym of Colasposoma, though this proposed synonymy has been ignored in later works.

== Species ==
- Thysbina amata (J. Thomson, 1858)
- Thysbina antiqua (Harold, 1879)
- Thysbina bicostata Weise, 1902
- Thysbina fallax Weise, 1902
- Thysbina femoralis (Lefèvre, 1877)
- Thysbina lefevrei (Baly, 1881)
- Thysbina pleuralis Weise, 1915
- Thysbina rufipes Weise, 1902
- Thysbina viridimarginata (Jacoby, 1894)

Species moved to Ennodius:

- Thysbina caerulea Pic, 1952
- Thysbina gabonica Pic, 1952: synonym of Ennodius murrayi (Chapuis, 1874)

Species moved to Timentes:

- Thysbina camerunensis Pic, 1953
