= Ferreirana dejeani =

Scientific classification
- Kingdom: Animalia
- Phylum: Arthropoda
- Clade: Pancrustacea
- Class: Insecta
- Order: Coleoptera
- Suborder: Polyphaga
- Infraorder: Cucujiformia
- Family: Chrysomelidae
- Genus: Ferreirana
- Species: F. dejeani

Binomial name
- Ferreirana dejeani (Lefèvre, 1877)

Synonyms
- Colasposoma dejeani Lefèvre, 1877

Species of beetle

Ferreirana dejeani is a species of leaf beetle found in West Africa. It was first described from Senegal by Édouard Lefèvre in 1877, as a species of Colasposoma, and was transferred to the genus Ferreirana by Jan Bechyné in 1958.
