= Ferreirana =

Scientific classification
- Kingdom: Animalia
- Phylum: Arthropoda
- Clade: Pancrustacea
- Class: Insecta
- Order: Coleoptera
- Suborder: Polyphaga
- Infraorder: Cucujiformia
- Family: Chrysomelidae
- Subfamily: Eumolpinae
- Tribe: Euryopini
- Genus: Ferreirana; Bechyné, 1958

Type species
- Colasposoma dejeani Lefèvre, 1877

Genus of leaf beetles from Africa

Ferreirana is a genus of leaf beetles in the subfamily Eumolpinae. It is known from three species described from Mozambique and West Africa, which were formerly placed in the genus Colasposoma. The genus was first described by Jan Bechyné in 1958, in a paper on a collection of leaf beetles from the Museu Dr. Álvaro de Castro (now the Natural History Museum of Mozambique) passed to him by Portuguese entomologist Maria Corinta Ferreira.

== Species ==
- Ferreirana dejeani (Lefèvre, 1877) – West Africa
- Ferreirana donckieri (Pic, 1942) – Mozambique
- Ferreirana foveata (Jacoby, 1897) – Mozambique
