= Colasposoma aeneoviolaceum =

Scientific classification
- Kingdom: Animalia
- Phylum: Arthropoda
- Clade: Pancrustacea
- Class: Insecta
- Order: Coleoptera
- Suborder: Polyphaga
- Infraorder: Cucujiformia
- Family: Chrysomelidae
- Genus: Colasposoma
- Subgenus: Colasposoma (Colasposoma)
- Species: C. aeneoviolaceum

Binomial name
- Colasposoma aeneoviolaceum Burgeon, 1941

Species of beetle

Colasposoma aeneoviolaceum is a species of leaf beetle of the Democratic Republic of the Congo. It was first described by the Belgian entomologist Louis Burgeon in 1941.

== Description ==
Adults measure between 7 and 10 mm in length. They have a shiny bronze-coloured dorsum, while the edges of the pronotum, the underparts and the feet are violet in colour. However, one specimen from Moliro was found with a blue underside. The species generally resembles Colasposoma overlaeti.

== Subspecies ==
There are two subspecies of C. aeneoviolaceum:

- Colasposoma aeneoviolaceum aeneoviolaceum Burgeon, 1941: the nominotypical subspecies
- Colasposoma aeneoviolaceum elisabethae Burgeon, 1941: Compared to the nominal form, the adults differ in their bronze colouring, have a cupreous or tanned underside, and have less abundant elytral punctuation. The subspecies was described from Élisabethville (now Lubumbashi), in the south of Katanga.
