= Pathius =

Scientific classification
- Kingdom: Animalia
- Phylum: Arthropoda
- Clade: Pancrustacea
- Class: Insecta
- Order: Coleoptera
- Suborder: Polyphaga
- Infraorder: Cucujiformia
- Family: Chrysomelidae
- Subfamily: Eumolpinae
- Tribe: Euryopini
- Genus: Pathius; Aslam, 1968

Type species
- Taphius flavus Jacoby, 1897

Synonyms
- Taphius Jacoby, 1897 (nec Adams, 1855 nec Rafinesque, 1815)

Genus of leaf beetles from Africa

Pathius is a genus of leaf beetles in the subfamily Eumolpinae. It is known from Africa and the Arabian Peninsula.

The genus was originally named Taphius by Martin Jacoby in 1897; however, this name was preoccupied by Taphius Adams, 1855 (a genus in Mollusca, currently a synonym of Biomphalaria Preston, 1910) and Taphius Rafinesque, 1815 (a nomen nudum genus in Crustacea), so it was renamed to Pathius by N. A. Aslam in 1968.

== Species ==
- Pathius daccordii Zoia, 2020
- Pathius flavus (Jacoby, 1897)
- Pathius maculatus (Bryant, 1957)
- Pathius major (Weise, 1912)
- Pathius pallidus (Weise, 1912)
- Pathius pici Zoia, 2019
- Pathius tanganikanus (Burgeon, 1941)
- Pathius variabilis (Selman, 1963)
- Pathius vulgaris (Chapuis, 1879) (Phascus?)
