= Colasposoma brevepilosum =

Scientific classification
- Kingdom: Animalia
- Phylum: Arthropoda
- Clade: Pancrustacea
- Class: Insecta
- Order: Coleoptera
- Suborder: Polyphaga
- Infraorder: Cucujiformia
- Family: Chrysomelidae
- Genus: Colasposoma
- Subgenus: Colasposoma (Colasposoma)
- Species: C. brevepilosum

Binomial name
- Colasposoma brevepilosum Zoia, 2012

Species of beetle

Colasposoma brevepilosum is a species of leaf beetle endemic to Socotra. The species was described by Stefano Zoia in 2012. The species name refers to the short pubescence of the dorsum.

== Subspecies ==
There are three subspecies of Colasposoma brevepilosum:

- Colasposoma brevepilosum brevepilosum Zoia, 2012: The nominotypical subspecies.
- Colasposoma brevepilosum maritimum Zoia, 2012: The subspecies name refers to the specimens of the subspecies being collected at low altitude, not far from the sea.
- Colasposoma brevepilosum orientale Zoia, 2012: The subspecies name refers to the fact the specimen studied was collected in the easternmost area of Socotra.
