= Colasposoma instabile =

Scientific classification
- Kingdom: Animalia
- Phylum: Arthropoda
- Clade: Pancrustacea
- Class: Insecta
- Order: Coleoptera
- Suborder: Polyphaga
- Infraorder: Cucujiformia
- Family: Chrysomelidae
- Genus: Colasposoma
- Subgenus: Colasposoma (Colasposoma)
- Species: C. instabile

Binomial name
- Colasposoma instabile Harold, 1877

Synonyms
- Colasposoma inconstans Harold, 1877 (nec Baly, 1864); Colasposoma varians Baly, 1878

Species of beetle

Colasposoma instabile is a species of leaf beetle of Southeast Africa and the Democratic Republic of the Congo, described by the German entomologist Edgar von Harold in 1877.
