= Odontionopa =

Scientific classification
- Kingdom: Animalia
- Phylum: Arthropoda
- Clade: Pancrustacea
- Class: Insecta
- Order: Coleoptera
- Suborder: Polyphaga
- Infraorder: Cucujiformia
- Family: Chrysomelidae
- Subfamily: Eumolpinae
- Tribe: Euryopini
- Genus: Odontionopa; Chevrolat in Dejean, 1836

Type species
- Colaspis sericea Gyllenhal, 1808

Synonyms
- Prasoidea Weise, 1907

Genus of leaf beetles

Odontionopa is a genus of leaf beetles in the subfamily Eumolpinae. It is distributed in Africa.

== Species ==
Species in the genus include:

- Odontionopa caerulea Jacoby, 1900 – Zimbabwe
- Odontionopa chloris Lefèvre, 1885 – South Africa
- Odontionopa dentata (Olivier, 1808) – Benin
- Odontionopa discolor Lefèvre, 1890 – South Africa
- Odontionopa sericea (Gyllenhal, 1808) – South Africa
