= Colasposoma fairmairei =

Scientific classification
- Kingdom: Animalia
- Phylum: Arthropoda
- Clade: Pancrustacea
- Class: Insecta
- Order: Coleoptera
- Suborder: Polyphaga
- Infraorder: Cucujiformia
- Family: Chrysomelidae
- Genus: Colasposoma
- Subgenus: Colasposoma (Colasposoma)
- Species: C. fairmairei

Binomial name
- Colasposoma fairmairei Lefèvre, 1877

Synonyms
- Colasposoma kraatzi Jacoby, 1897; Dasychlorus varicolor Fairmaire, 1899

Species of beetle

Colasposoma fairmairei is a species of leaf beetle found in West and Central Africa. It was first described from Old Calabar and Benin by Édouard Lefèvre in 1877. It is closely related to Colasposoma abdominale, which it is possibly only a race of.

== Subspecies ==
There are two subspecies of C. fairmairei:

- Colasposoma fairmairei fairmairei Lefèvre, 1877: The nominotypical subspecies. Distributed in Nigeria, Ghana, Cameroon, Equatorial Guinea, the Republic of the Congo, DR Congo (Garamba and Virunga National Parks, south to Kasai and Sankuru Districts), and South Sudan (Equatoria).
- Colasposoma fairmairei katangense Burgeon, 1941: Distributed from Maniema Province to Lake Tanganyika.
