= Melindea brunnea =

Scientific classification
- Kingdom: Animalia
- Phylum: Arthropoda
- Clade: Pancrustacea
- Class: Insecta
- Order: Coleoptera
- Suborder: Polyphaga
- Infraorder: Cucujiformia
- Family: Chrysomelidae
- Genus: Melindea
- Species: M. brunnea

Binomial name
- Melindea brunnea (Jacoby, 1901)

Synonyms
- Mashonania brunnea Jacoby, 1901

Species of beetle

Melindea brunnea is a species of leaf beetle of Zimbabwe and the Democratic Republic of the Congo. It was first described from Harare by Martin Jacoby in 1901.
