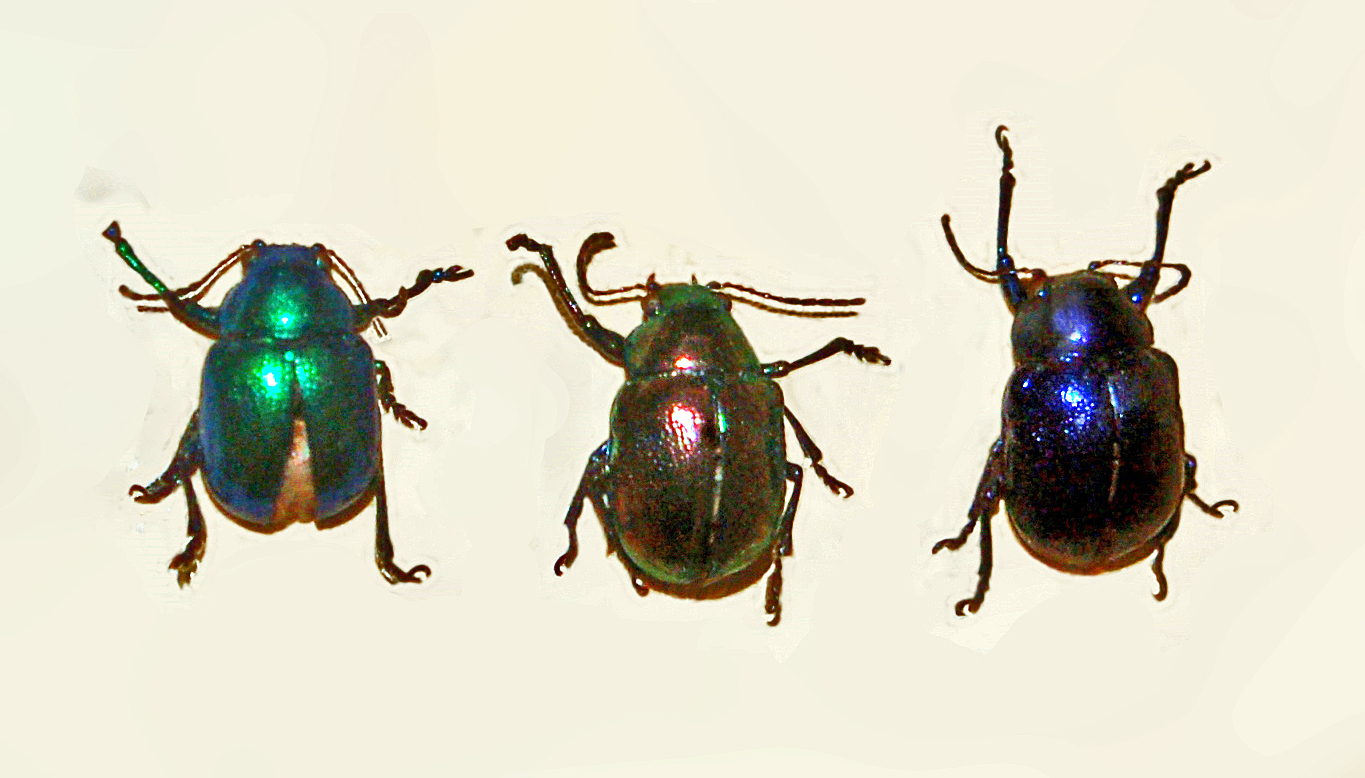
- Colasposoma viridicoeruleum from Sumatra. Mounted specimen

Scientific classification
- Kingdom: Animalia
- Phylum: Arthropoda
- Clade: Pancrustacea
- Class: Insecta
- Order: Coleoptera
- Suborder: Polyphaga
- Infraorder: Cucujiformia
- Family: Chrysomelidae
- Genus: Colasposoma
- Subgenus: Colasposoma (Colasposoma)
- Species: C. viridicoeruleum

Binomial name
- Colasposoma viridicoeruleum Motschulsky, 1860

Synonyms
- Colasposoma auripenne Motschulsky, 1860; Colasposoma pulcherrimum Baly, 1864; Colasposoma metallicum Clark, 1865; Colasposoma mutabile Baly, 1867; Colasposoma annamita Lefèvre, 1885; Colasposoma capitatum Jacoby, 1889; Colasposoma affine Lefèvre, 1890; Colasposoma oberthuri Jacoby, 1896; Colasposoma brevenotatum Pic, 1937; Colasposoma jeanvoinei Pic, 1937; Colasposoma perroudi Pic, 1937

= Colasposoma viridicoeruleum =

Species of leaf beetle

Colasposoma viridicoeruleum is a species of beetle belonging to the family Chrysomelidae, described by Victor Motschulsky in 1860. It is known as a pest of sweet potatoes. The species was formerly known as Colasposoma auripenne until 2003, when C. auripenne was determined to be a synonym of C. viridicoeruleum. It is sometimes considered a southern subspecies of Colasposoma dauricum, using the name Colasposoma dauricum auripenne.

== Description ==
Colasposoma viridicoeruleum can reach a length of 4–5 millimetres (0.16–0.20 in). The body is metallic green, blue or dark violaceous. Head is closely punctured, with black antennae. Thorax is twice as broad as long, with rounded sides and a punctured surface. Elytra show more strong punctures in irregular rows.

== Distribution ==
This species can be found in India, Andaman Islands, Myanmar, Malayan Subregion (Malay Peninsula, Sumatra, Java, Borneo and all the Indonesian Archipelago), Amur River region and China.
