= Colasposoma aruwimiense =

Scientific classification
- Kingdom: Animalia
- Phylum: Arthropoda
- Clade: Pancrustacea
- Class: Insecta
- Order: Coleoptera
- Suborder: Polyphaga
- Infraorder: Cucujiformia
- Family: Chrysomelidae
- Genus: Colasposoma
- Subgenus: Colasposoma (Colasposoma)
- Species: C. aruwimiense

Binomial name
- Colasposoma aruwimiense Gahan, 1892

Species of beetle

Colasposoma aruwimiense is a species of leaf beetles of the Democratic Republic of the Congo, described by Irish entomologist Charles Joseph Gahan in 1892.
