= Eumolpopsis =

Scientific classification
- Kingdom: Animalia
- Phylum: Arthropoda
- Clade: Pancrustacea
- Class: Insecta
- Order: Coleoptera
- Suborder: Polyphaga
- Infraorder: Cucujiformia
- Family: Chrysomelidae
- Subfamily: Eumolpinae
- Tribe: Euryopini
- Genus: Eumolpopsis; Jacoby, 1894
- Species: E. dimidiatus

Binomial name
- Eumolpopsis dimidiatus (Jacoby, 1893)

Synonyms
- Genus: Pseudeumolpus Jacoby, 1893 (nec Kraatz, 1890); Favarelius Pic, 1938; Species: Pseudeumolpus dimidiatus Jacoby, 1893; Favarelius atrimembris Pic, 1938

Genus of leaf beetles from Africa

Eumolpopsis is a genus of leaf beetles in the subfamily Eumolpinae. It contains only one species, Eumolpopsis dimidiatus, found in Gabon, the Republic of the Congo, and the Democratic Republic of the Congo. The species was first described by Martin Jacoby in 1893, who named it Pseudeumolpus dimidiatus. However, Pseudeumolpus was found to be preoccupied, so the genus was renamed to Eumolpopsis by Jacoby in 1894.
