= Paracrothinium =

Scientific classification
- Kingdom: Animalia
- Phylum: Arthropoda
- Clade: Pancrustacea
- Class: Insecta
- Order: Coleoptera
- Suborder: Polyphaga
- Infraorder: Cucujiformia
- Family: Chrysomelidae
- Subfamily: Eumolpinae
- Tribe: Euryopini
- Genus: Paracrothinium; Chen, 1940

Type species
- Paracrothinium cupricolle Chen, 1940

Genus of leaf beetles from Asia

Paracrothinium is a genus of leaf beetles in the subfamily Eumolpinae. It is known from Asia.

== Species ==
- Paracrothinium collare Kimoto & Gressitt, 1982 – Laos
- Paracrothinium consimile Chen, 1940 – Vietnam
- Paracrothinium cupricolle Chen, 1940 – Southern China (Guangxi)
- Paracrothinium latum (Pic, 1928) – Central China (Hunan), Vietnam
- Paracrothinium rufum Medvedev, 1993 – Southwestern China (Sichuan)
