= Melindea pubescens =

Scientific classification
- Kingdom: Animalia
- Phylum: Arthropoda
- Clade: Pancrustacea
- Class: Insecta
- Order: Coleoptera
- Suborder: Polyphaga
- Infraorder: Cucujiformia
- Family: Chrysomelidae
- Genus: Melindea
- Species: M. pubescens

Binomial name
- Melindea pubescens (Bryant, 1941)

Synonyms
- Mashonania pubescens Bryant, 1941

Species of beetle

Melindea pubescens is a species of leaf beetle of Senegal, described by Gilbert Ernest Bryant in 1941.
