= Colasposoma tinantae =

Scientific classification
- Kingdom: Animalia
- Phylum: Arthropoda
- Clade: Pancrustacea
- Class: Insecta
- Order: Coleoptera
- Suborder: Polyphaga
- Infraorder: Cucujiformia
- Family: Chrysomelidae
- Genus: Colasposoma
- Subgenus: Colasposoma (Colasposoma)
- Species: C. tinantae

Binomial name
- Colasposoma tinantae Burgeon, 1941

Species of beetle

Colasposoma tinantae is a species of leaf beetle of the Democratic Republic of the Congo, Zambia and Malawi. It was first described by the Belgian entomologist Louis Burgeon in 1941.
