= Lefevrea carpenteri =

Scientific classification
- Kingdom: Animalia
- Phylum: Arthropoda
- Clade: Pancrustacea
- Class: Insecta
- Order: Coleoptera
- Suborder: Polyphaga
- Infraorder: Cucujiformia
- Family: Chrysomelidae
- Genus: Lefevrea
- Species: L. carpenteri

Binomial name
- Lefevrea carpenteri Bryant, 1932

Species of beetle

Lefevrea carpenteri is a species of leaf beetle of the Republic of the Congo, the Democratic Republic of the Congo, Uganda, Rwanda, Ivory Coast and Cameroon. It was first described by the British entomologist Gilbert Ernest Bryant in 1932, from specimens collected by the British entomologist Geoffrey Douglas Hale Carpenter from Gulu, Uganda in 1925.
