= Colasposoma senegalense =

Scientific classification
- Kingdom: Animalia
- Phylum: Arthropoda
- Clade: Pancrustacea
- Class: Insecta
- Order: Coleoptera
- Suborder: Polyphaga
- Infraorder: Cucujiformia
- Family: Chrysomelidae
- Genus: Colasposoma
- Subgenus: Colasposoma (Colasposoma)
- Species: C. senegalense

Binomial name
- Colasposoma senegalense Laporte, 1833

Species of beetle

Colasposoma senegalense is a species of leaf beetle found in Senegal and the Democratic Republic of the Congo. It was first described from Senegal by François-Louis Laporte in 1833.
