= Euryope sanguinea =

Scientific classification
- Kingdom: Animalia
- Phylum: Arthropoda
- Clade: Pancrustacea
- Class: Insecta
- Order: Coleoptera
- Suborder: Polyphaga
- Infraorder: Cucujiformia
- Family: Chrysomelidae
- Genus: Euryope
- Species: E. sanguinea

Binomial name
- Euryope sanguinea (Olivier, 1808)

Species of beetle

Euryope sanguinea is a species of leaf beetle of the Democratic Republic of the Congo and the Republic of the Congo, described by Guillaume-Antoine Olivier in 1808.
