= Melindea ferruginipes =

Scientific classification
- Kingdom: Animalia
- Phylum: Arthropoda
- Clade: Pancrustacea
- Class: Insecta
- Order: Coleoptera
- Suborder: Polyphaga
- Infraorder: Cucujiformia
- Family: Chrysomelidae
- Genus: Melindea
- Species: M. ferruginipes

Binomial name
- Melindea ferruginipes (Weise, 1924)

Synonyms
- Mashonania ferruginipes Weise, 1924

Species of beetle

Melindea ferruginipes is a species of leaf beetle of the Democratic Republic of the Congo and Ivory Coast, described by Julius Weise in 1924.
