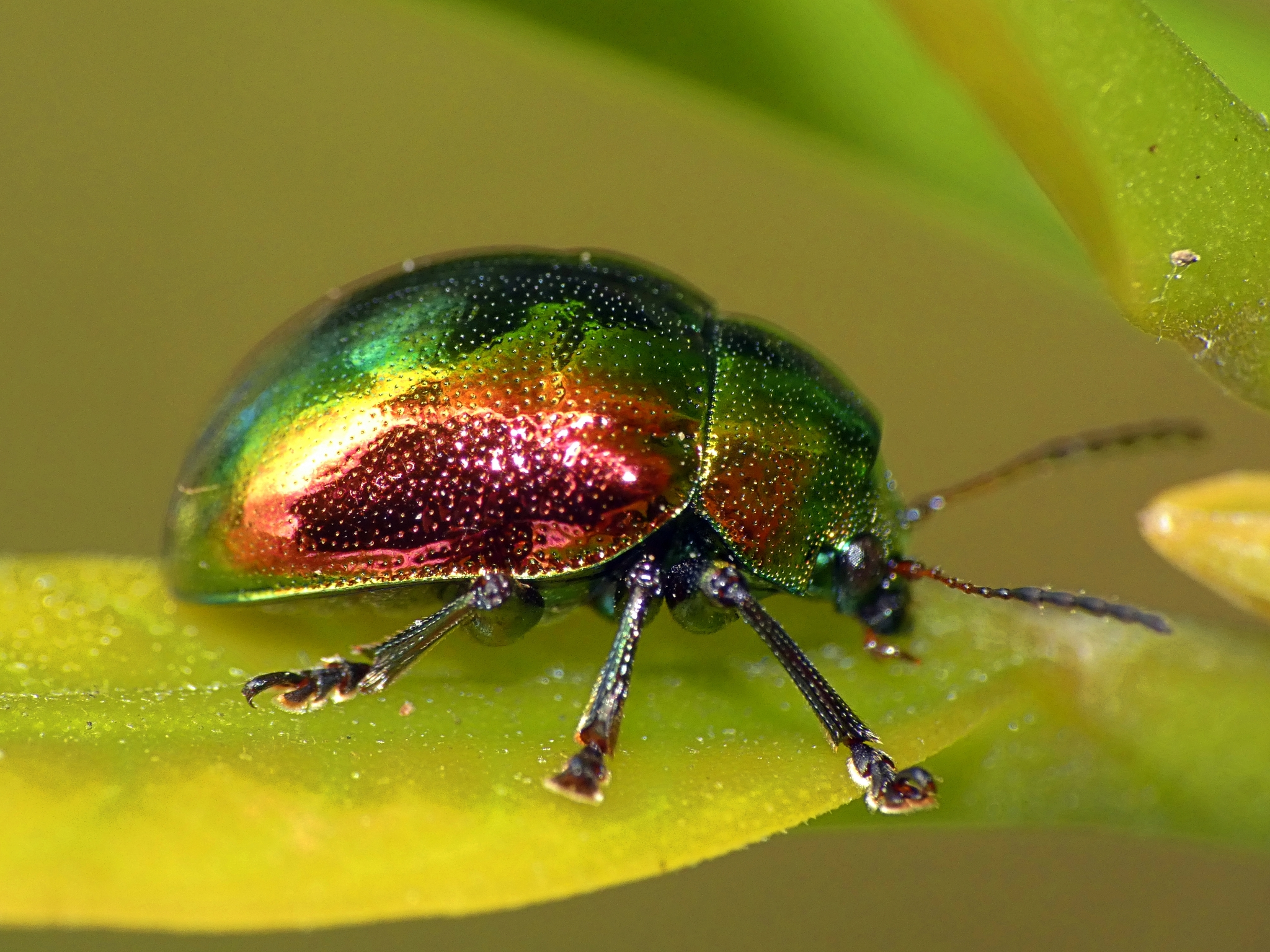
- Colasposoma sellatum from the Shire of Douglas, Queensland, Australia

Scientific classification
- Kingdom: Animalia
- Phylum: Arthropoda
- Clade: Pancrustacea
- Class: Insecta
- Order: Coleoptera
- Suborder: Polyphaga
- Infraorder: Cucujiformia
- Family: Chrysomelidae
- Genus: Colasposoma
- Subgenus: Colasposoma (Colasposoma)
- Species: C. sellatum

Binomial name
- Colasposoma sellatum Baly, 1878

Synonyms
- Colasposoma barbatum Harold, 1879; Colasposoma regulare Jacoby, 1885

= Colasposoma sellatum =

Species of beetle

Colasposoma sellatum is a species of leaf beetle from Australia and Papua New Guinea, described by Joseph Sugar Baly in 1878. In Australia, it is found around Darwin in the Northern Territory, in the north-east of Queensland and on the Torres Strait Islands. It is the only member of the genus Colasposoma found in Australia, where it is known as a pest of sweet potatoes.

== Description ==
Adults are between 6.2 and 9.2 mm in length, and are strongly metallic in appearance. They are generally coloured green or blue, rarely coppery or purple, though they frequently have a different colour along the elytral suture or lateral margins. The legs are black with metallic reflections. The basalmost segment of each antennae is usually black, or sometimes reddish-brown; the next five segments are reddish-brown and the last five are black.

Larvae are white, with a body length of approximately 1.5 mm in the first instar, to approximately 12.0 mm in the fifth instar.
