= Colasposoma sumptuosum =

Scientific classification
- Kingdom: Animalia
- Phylum: Arthropoda
- Clade: Pancrustacea
- Class: Insecta
- Order: Coleoptera
- Suborder: Polyphaga
- Infraorder: Cucujiformia
- Family: Chrysomelidae
- Genus: Colasposoma
- Subgenus: Colasposoma (Colasposoma)
- Species: C. sumptuosum

Binomial name
- Colasposoma sumptuosum Weise, 1906

Species of beetle

Colasposoma sumptuosum is a species of leaf beetle of Tanzania and the Democratic Republic of the Congo. It was first described from Kigonsera by Julius Weise in 1906.
