= Colasposoma bonvouloiri =

Scientific classification
- Kingdom: Animalia
- Phylum: Arthropoda
- Clade: Pancrustacea
- Class: Insecta
- Order: Coleoptera
- Suborder: Polyphaga
- Infraorder: Cucujiformia
- Family: Chrysomelidae
- Genus: Colasposoma
- Subgenus: Colasposoma (Colasposoma)
- Species: C. bonvouloiri

Binomial name
- Colasposoma bonvouloiri Lefèvre, 1877

Synonyms
- Colasposoma thoracicum Lefèvre, 1877

Species of beetle

Colasposoma bonvouloiri is a species of leaf beetle of South Africa and the Democratic Republic of the Congo. It was first described by Édouard Lefèvre in 1877.
