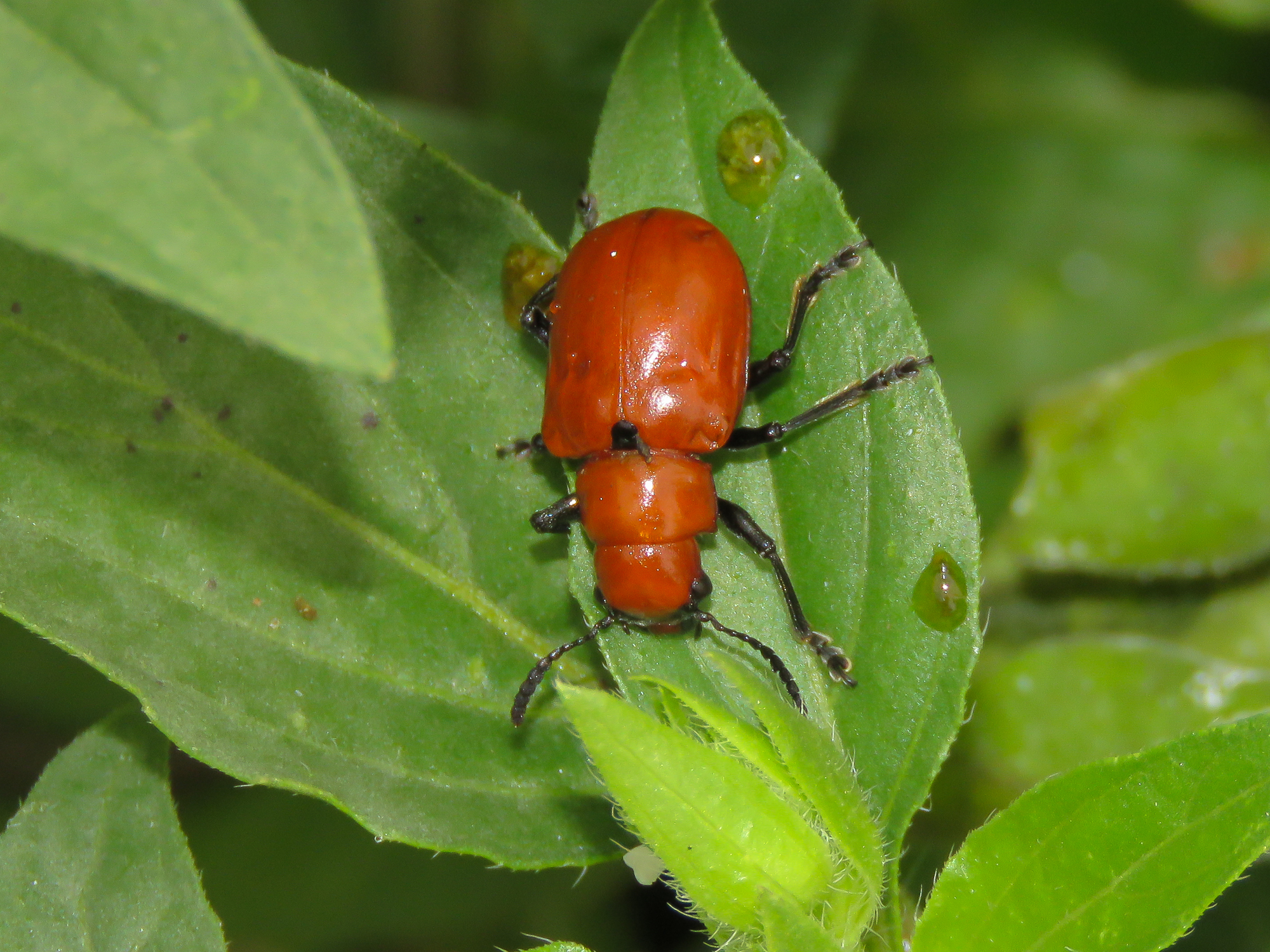

Scientific classification
- Kingdom: Animalia
- Phylum: Arthropoda
- Clade: Pancrustacea
- Class: Insecta
- Order: Coleoptera
- Suborder: Polyphaga
- Infraorder: Cucujiformia
- Family: Chrysomelidae
- Genus: Euryope
- Species: E. batesi

Binomial name
- Euryope batesi Jacoby, 1880

= Euryope batesi =

Species of beetle

Euryope batesi is a species of leaf beetle of East Africa and the Democratic Republic of the Congo. It was first described from the Nguru Mountains by Martin Jacoby in 1880.

Adults of the species are small, measuring 9 to 10 mm in length. Their bodies are red from above, while their undersides as well as their legs and antennae are entirely black.
