= Ennodius orientalis =

Scientific classification
- Kingdom: Animalia
- Phylum: Arthropoda
- Clade: Pancrustacea
- Class: Insecta
- Order: Coleoptera
- Suborder: Polyphaga
- Infraorder: Cucujiformia
- Family: Chrysomelidae
- Genus: Ennodius
- Species: E. orientalis

Binomial name
- Ennodius orientalis Kuntzen, 1912

Species of beetle

Ennodius orientalis is a species of leaf beetle of East Africa and the Democratic Republic of the Congo. It was first described by Heinrich Kuntzen in 1912.
