= Phascus occidentalis =

Scientific classification
- Kingdom: Animalia
- Phylum: Arthropoda
- Clade: Pancrustacea
- Class: Insecta
- Order: Coleoptera
- Suborder: Polyphaga
- Infraorder: Cucujiformia
- Family: Chrysomelidae
- Genus: Phascus
- Species: P. occidentalis

Binomial name
- Phascus occidentalis Weise, 1912

Species of beetle

Phascus occidentalis is a species of leaf beetle of Cameroon and the Democratic Republic of the Congo. It was first described by Julius Weise in 1912.
