= Thysbina femoralis =

Scientific classification
- Kingdom: Animalia
- Phylum: Arthropoda
- Clade: Pancrustacea
- Class: Insecta
- Order: Coleoptera
- Suborder: Polyphaga
- Infraorder: Cucujiformia
- Family: Chrysomelidae
- Genus: Thysbina
- Species: T. femoralis

Binomial name
- Thysbina femoralis (Lefèvre, 1877)

Synonyms
- Colasposoma femorale Lefèvre, 1877

Species of beetle

Thysbina femoralis is a species of leaf beetle of Senegal and the Democratic Republic of the Congo. It was first described by Édouard Lefèvre in 1877.
