= Colasposoma tibiale =

Scientific classification
- Kingdom: Animalia
- Phylum: Arthropoda
- Clade: Pancrustacea
- Class: Insecta
- Order: Coleoptera
- Suborder: Polyphaga
- Infraorder: Cucujiformia
- Family: Chrysomelidae
- Genus: Colasposoma
- Subgenus: Colasposoma (Colasposoma)
- Species: C. tibiale

Binomial name
- Colasposoma tibiale Baly, 1878

Species of beetle

Colasposoma tibiale is a species of leaf beetle of East Africa and the Democratic Republic of the Congo. It was first described from Lake Nyassa by Joseph Sugar Baly in 1878.
