= Euryope bipartita =

Scientific classification
- Kingdom: Animalia
- Phylum: Arthropoda
- Clade: Pancrustacea
- Class: Insecta
- Order: Coleoptera
- Suborder: Polyphaga
- Infraorder: Cucujiformia
- Family: Chrysomelidae
- Genus: Euryope
- Species: E. bipartita

Binomial name
- Euryope bipartita Jacoby, 1897

Synonyms
- Euryope laeviuscula Weise, 1908; Euryope simplex Weise, 1915

Species of beetle

Euryope bipartita is a species of leaf beetle of the Democratic Republic of the Congo, described by Martin Jacoby in 1897. The species was originally described from a single specimen from the collection of Major von Quedenfeldt, with no locality indicated. The body of the adult is colored black, except for the head, the pronotum, and the rearmost third of the elytra which all have a fulvous color.
