= Obelistes acutangulus =

Scientific classification
- Kingdom: Animalia
- Phylum: Arthropoda
- Clade: Pancrustacea
- Class: Insecta
- Order: Coleoptera
- Suborder: Polyphaga
- Infraorder: Cucujiformia
- Family: Chrysomelidae
- Genus: Obelistes
- Species: O. acutangulus

Binomial name
- Obelistes acutangulus Weise, 1895

Species of beetle

Obelistes acutangulus is a species of leaf beetle from Ghana and the Democratic Republic of the Congo. It was first described by Julius Weise in 1895.
