= Melindea opaca =

Scientific classification
- Kingdom: Animalia
- Phylum: Arthropoda
- Clade: Pancrustacea
- Class: Insecta
- Order: Coleoptera
- Suborder: Polyphaga
- Infraorder: Cucujiformia
- Family: Chrysomelidae
- Genus: Melindea
- Species: M. opaca

Binomial name
- Melindea opaca (Weise, 1915)

Species of beetle

Melindea opaca is a species of leaf beetle of the Democratic Republic of the Congo, described by Julius Weise in 1915.
