= Lefevrea leroyi =

Scientific classification
- Kingdom: Animalia
- Phylum: Arthropoda
- Clade: Pancrustacea
- Class: Insecta
- Order: Coleoptera
- Suborder: Polyphaga
- Infraorder: Cucujiformia
- Family: Chrysomelidae
- Genus: Lefevrea
- Species: L. leroyi

Binomial name
- Lefevrea leroyi Burgeon, 1940

Species of beetle

Lefevrea leroyi is a species of leaf beetle. It is distributed in the Democratic Republic of the Congo, South Sudan and Ivory Coast. It was first described by the Belgian entomologist Louis Burgeon in 1940. Host plants for the species include the aerial parts of Gramineae, and Combretum spp.
