= Colasposoma holasi =

Scientific classification
- Kingdom: Animalia
- Phylum: Arthropoda
- Clade: Pancrustacea
- Class: Insecta
- Order: Coleoptera
- Suborder: Polyphaga
- Infraorder: Cucujiformia
- Family: Chrysomelidae
- Genus: Colasposoma
- Subgenus: Colasposoma (Colasposoma)
- Species: C. holasi

Binomial name
- Colasposoma holasi Pic, 1953

Species of beetle

Colasposoma holasi is a species of leaf beetle of the Democratic Republic of the Congo, described by Maurice Pic in 1953.
