= Melindea =

Scientific classification
- Kingdom: Animalia
- Phylum: Arthropoda
- Clade: Pancrustacea
- Class: Insecta
- Order: Coleoptera
- Suborder: Polyphaga
- Infraorder: Cucujiformia
- Family: Chrysomelidae
- Subfamily: Eumolpinae
- Tribe: Euryopini
- Genus: Melindea; Lefèvre, 1884

Type species
- Melindea abyssinica Lefèvre, 1884

Synonyms
- Mashonania Jacoby, 1901; Casmenella Jacoby, 1904; Falsoparnops Pic, 1923

Genus of leaf beetles from Africa

Melindea is a genus of leaf beetles in the subfamily Eumolpinae. It is known from Africa.

== Species ==
- Melindea abyssinica Lefèvre, 1884 – Ethiopia
- Melindea brunnea (Jacoby, 1901) – Zimbabwe, DR Congo
- Melindea denticrus (Burgeon, 1941) – Cameroon
- Melindea ferruginipes (Weise, 1924) – DR Congo, Ivory Coast
- Melindea limbata (Pic, 1923) – Ethiopia
- Melindea nigripes (Bryant, 1954) – Kenya
- Melindea nigrita (Jacoby, 1901) – Ethiopia, Kenya, DR Congo, Uganda, Sudan
- Melindea nigritarsis (Bryant, 1954) – Ethiopia
- Melindea opaca (Weise, 1915) – DR Congo
- Melindea pubescens (Bryant, 1941) – Senegal
- Melindea robusta (Pic, 1923) – Ethiopia
- Melindea rufescens (Pic, 1950) – Niger: Aïr Mountains
- Melindea semifulva (Bryant, 1954) – Kenya
- Melindea virescens (Lefèvre, 1885) – Ethiopia
