= Colasposoma auripes =

Scientific classification
- Kingdom: Animalia
- Phylum: Arthropoda
- Clade: Pancrustacea
- Class: Insecta
- Order: Coleoptera
- Suborder: Polyphaga
- Infraorder: Cucujiformia
- Family: Chrysomelidae
- Genus: Colasposoma
- Subgenus: Colasposoma (Colasposoma)
- Species: C. auripes

Binomial name
- Colasposoma auripes Jacoby, 1894

Species of beetle

Colasposoma auripes is a species of leaf beetles of East Africa and the Democratic Republic of the Congo, described by Martin Jacoby in 1894.

== Subspecies ==
There are two subspecies of C. auripes:

- Colasposoma auripes auripes Jacoby, 1894: nominotypical subspecies
- Colasposoma auripes kafakumbae Burgeon, 1941
