= Thysbina amata =

Scientific classification
- Kingdom: Animalia
- Phylum: Arthropoda
- Clade: Pancrustacea
- Class: Insecta
- Order: Coleoptera
- Suborder: Polyphaga
- Infraorder: Cucujiformia
- Family: Chrysomelidae
- Genus: Thysbina
- Species: T. amata

Binomial name
- Thysbina amata (J. Thomson, 1858)

Synonyms
- Colasposoma marginicolle Lefèvre, 1889; Thysbe amata J. Thomson, 1858

Species of beetle

Thysbina amata is a species of leaf beetle of Gabon, the Republic of the Congo, Democratic Republic of the Congo and Ivory Coast, described by James Thomson in 1858.
