= Colasposoma rufimembris =

Scientific classification
- Kingdom: Animalia
- Phylum: Arthropoda
- Clade: Pancrustacea
- Class: Insecta
- Order: Coleoptera
- Suborder: Polyphaga
- Infraorder: Cucujiformia
- Family: Chrysomelidae
- Genus: Colasposoma
- Subgenus: Colasposoma (Colasposoma)
- Species: C. rufimembris

Binomial name
- Colasposoma rufimembris Pic, 1942

Species of beetle

Colasposoma rufimembris is a species of leaf beetle of Senegal, described by Maurice Pic in 1942.
