= Colasposoma laticorne =

Scientific classification
- Kingdom: Animalia
- Phylum: Arthropoda
- Clade: Pancrustacea
- Class: Insecta
- Order: Coleoptera
- Suborder: Polyphaga
- Infraorder: Cucujiformia
- Family: Chrysomelidae
- Genus: Colasposoma
- Subgenus: Colasposoma (Colasposoma)
- Species: C. laticorne

Binomial name
- Colasposoma laticorne (J. Thomson, 1858)

Synonyms
- Thysbe laticornis J. Thomson, 1858; Dasychlorus passeti Fairmaire, 1898; Colasposoma pradieri Lefèvre, 1877

Species of beetle

Colasposoma laticorne is a species of leaf beetle of West Africa and the Democratic Republic of the Congo. It was first described from Gabon by James Thomson in 1858.
