= Odontiomorpha =

Scientific classification
- Kingdom: Animalia
- Phylum: Arthropoda
- Clade: Pancrustacea
- Class: Insecta
- Order: Coleoptera
- Suborder: Polyphaga
- Infraorder: Cucujiformia
- Family: Chrysomelidae
- Subfamily: Eumolpinae
- Tribe: Euryopini
- Genus: Odontiomorpha; Jacoby, 1900

Type species
- Odontiomorpha minuta Jacoby, 1900

Genus of leaf beetles from Africa

Odontiomorpha is a genus of leaf beetles in the subfamily Eumolpinae. It is distributed in South Africa.

== Species ==
- Odontiomorpha capensis Zoia, 2011
- Odontiomorpha cuprina Zoia, 2011
- Odontiomorpha minuta Jacoby, 1900
- Odontiomorpha spinipennis Zoia & Grobbelaar, 2011
