= Lefevrea aeneoviridis =

Scientific classification
- Kingdom: Animalia
- Phylum: Arthropoda
- Clade: Pancrustacea
- Class: Insecta
- Order: Coleoptera
- Suborder: Polyphaga
- Infraorder: Cucujiformia
- Family: Chrysomelidae
- Genus: Lefevrea
- Species: L. aeneoviridis

Binomial name
- Lefevrea aeneoviridis Bryant, 1932

Species of beetle

Lefevrea aeneoviridis is a species of leaf beetle of the Democratic Republic of the Congo, Uganda and Rwanda. It was first described by the British entomologist Gilbert Ernest Bryant in 1932, from specimens collected by the British entomologist Harry Hargreaves from Bugomolo, Uganda in 1927.
