= Lefevrea troupini =

Scientific classification
- Kingdom: Animalia
- Phylum: Arthropoda
- Clade: Pancrustacea
- Class: Insecta
- Order: Coleoptera
- Suborder: Polyphaga
- Infraorder: Cucujiformia
- Family: Chrysomelidae
- Genus: Lefevrea
- Species: L. troupini

Binomial name
- Lefevrea troupini Selman, 1972

Species of beetle

Lefevrea troupini is a species of leaf beetle reported from the Republic of the Congo and the Democratic Republic of the Congo. It was first described from Garamba National Park by Brian J. Selman in 1972. Its host plants include Beckeropsis uniseta, Eriosema psoraleoides and Grewia mollis.
