= Colasposoma ovatum =

Scientific classification
- Kingdom: Animalia
- Phylum: Arthropoda
- Clade: Pancrustacea
- Class: Insecta
- Order: Coleoptera
- Suborder: Polyphaga
- Infraorder: Cucujiformia
- Family: Chrysomelidae
- Genus: Colasposoma
- Subgenus: Colasposoma (Colasposoma)
- Species: C. ovatum

Binomial name
- Colasposoma ovatum Achard, 1923

Species of beetle

Colasposoma ovatum is a species of leaf beetle from Senegal. The species was first described in 1923 by Julien Achard, from Sédhiou in the Casamance region.
