= Phascus pallidus =

Scientific classification
- Kingdom: Animalia
- Phylum: Arthropoda
- Clade: Pancrustacea
- Class: Insecta
- Order: Coleoptera
- Suborder: Polyphaga
- Infraorder: Cucujiformia
- Family: Chrysomelidae
- Genus: Phascus
- Species: P. pallidus

Binomial name
- Phascus pallidus Lefèvre, 1884

Species of beetle

Phascus pallidus is a species of leaf beetle found in southern and eastern Africa and the Arabian Peninsula. It was first described by Édouard Lefèvre in 1884, from the highlands of Hamasien (today part of Eritrea).

== Subspecies ==
There are two subspecies of P. pallidus:

- Phascus pallidus australis Zoia, 2019: found in Namibia, Kenya and Zambia
- Phascus pallidus pallidus Lefèvre, 1884: found in Eritrea and Saudi Arabia
