= Colasposoma aurichalcicum =

Scientific classification
- Kingdom: Animalia
- Phylum: Arthropoda
- Clade: Pancrustacea
- Class: Insecta
- Order: Coleoptera
- Suborder: Polyphaga
- Infraorder: Cucujiformia
- Family: Chrysomelidae
- Genus: Colasposoma
- Subgenus: Colasposoma (Colasposoma)
- Species: C. aurichalcicum

Binomial name
- Colasposoma aurichalcicum (J. Thomson, 1858)

Synonyms
- Thysbe aurichalcica J. Thomson, 1858

Species of beetle

Colasposoma aurichalcicum is a species of leaf beetles. It is distributed in Gabon, the Democratic Republic of the Congo and Ethiopia. It was described by the American entomologist James Thomson in 1858.
