= Colasposoma flavolimbatum =

Scientific classification
- Kingdom: Animalia
- Phylum: Arthropoda
- Clade: Pancrustacea
- Class: Insecta
- Order: Coleoptera
- Suborder: Polyphaga
- Infraorder: Cucujiformia
- Family: Chrysomelidae
- Genus: Colasposoma
- Subgenus: Colasposoma (Colasposoma)
- Species: C. flavolimbatum

Binomial name
- Colasposoma flavolimbatum (Pic, 1905)

Synonyms
- Coptocephala flavolimbatum Pic, 1905

Species of beetle

Colasposoma flavolimbatum is a species of leaf beetle of Algeria, described by Maurice Pic in 1905.
