= Lefevrea puncticollis =

Scientific classification
- Kingdom: Animalia
- Phylum: Arthropoda
- Clade: Pancrustacea
- Class: Insecta
- Order: Coleoptera
- Suborder: Polyphaga
- Infraorder: Cucujiformia
- Family: Chrysomelidae
- Genus: Lefevrea
- Species: L. puncticollis

Binomial name
- Lefevrea puncticollis Jacoby, 1897

Species of beetle

Lefevrea puncticollis is a species of leaf beetle of Zimbabwe and the Democratic Republic of the Congo. It was first described from Mashonaland by Martin Jacoby in 1897.
