= Melindea nigrita =

Scientific classification
- Kingdom: Animalia
- Phylum: Arthropoda
- Clade: Pancrustacea
- Class: Insecta
- Order: Coleoptera
- Suborder: Polyphaga
- Infraorder: Cucujiformia
- Family: Chrysomelidae
- Genus: Melindea
- Species: M. nigrita

Binomial name
- Melindea nigrita (Jacoby, 1901)

Synonyms
- Casmenella natalense Jacoby, 1904; Mashonania nigrita Jacoby, 1901

Species of beetle

Melindea nigrita is a species of leaf beetle. It is distributed in Ethiopia, Kenya, the Democratic Republic of the Congo, Uganda and South Sudan. It was described by Martin Jacoby in 1901.
