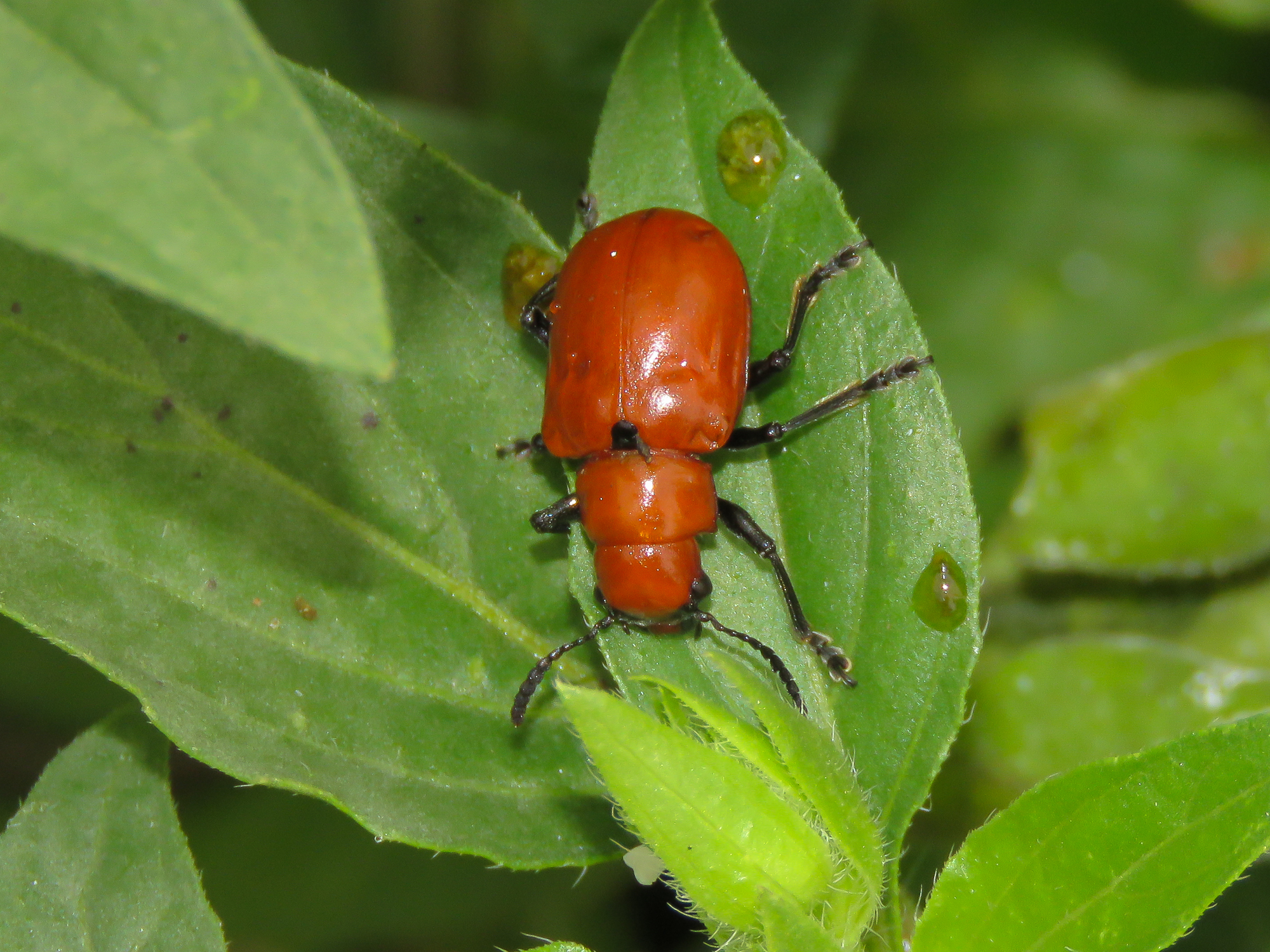
- Euryope batesi

Scientific classification
- Kingdom: Animalia
- Phylum: Arthropoda
- Clade: Pancrustacea
- Class: Insecta
- Order: Coleoptera
- Suborder: Polyphaga
- Infraorder: Cucujiformia
- Family: Chrysomelidae
- Subfamily: Eumolpinae
- Tribe: Euryopini
- Genus: Euryope; Dalman, 1824

Type species
- Eumolpus ruber (= Cryptocephalus rubrifrons Fabricius, 1787) Latreille, 1807

Synonyms
- Arachnosphaerus J. Thomson, 1856; Ecranus Walker, 1871; Bechyneia Jolivet, 1950

= Euryope =

Genus of leaf beetles from Africa

Euryope is a genus of leaf beetles in the subfamily Eumolpinae. It is distributed in Africa and the Arabian Peninsula.

== Species ==
- Euryope angulicollis Fairmaire, 1882
- Euryope barkeri Jacoby, 1904
- Euryope batesi Jacoby, 1880
- Euryope bipartita Jacoby, 1897
- Euryope cingulata Baly, 1860
- Euryope consobrina Lefèvre, 1875
- Euryope costata Clavareau, 1909
- Euryope cruciata Lefèvre, 1887
- Euryope discicollis Jacoby, 1895
- Euryope discoidalis Jacoby, 1897
- Euryope hoehneli Lefèvre, 1889
- Euryope humeralis Pic, 1939
- Euryope lightfooti Péringer, 1899
- Euryope marginalis Ancey, 1882
- Euryope megacephala (J. Thomson, 1856)
- Euryope minuta Jacoby, 1880
- Euryope monstrosa Baly, 1862
- Euryope nigricollis Jacoby, 1897
- Euryope nigrita Baly, 1881
- Euryope notabilis Péringuey, 1892
- Euryope pictipennis Jacoby, 1895
- Euryope pulchella Baly, 1881
- Euryope rubrifrons (Fabricius, 1787)
- Euryope rugulosa Weise, 1919
- Euryope sanguinea (Olivier, 1808)
- Euryope sauberlichi Weise, 1904
- Euryope subserricornis (Latreille, 1806)
- Euryope terminalis Baly, 1860
- Euryope vanderijsti Burgeon, 1941
- Euryope wellmani Clavareau, 1909
