= Lefevrea atromaculata =

Scientific classification
- Kingdom: Animalia
- Phylum: Arthropoda
- Clade: Pancrustacea
- Class: Insecta
- Order: Coleoptera
- Suborder: Polyphaga
- Infraorder: Cucujiformia
- Family: Chrysomelidae
- Genus: Lefevrea
- Species: L. atromaculata

Binomial name
- Lefevrea atromaculata Bryant, 1932

Species of beetle

Lefevrea atromaculata is a species of leaf beetle of the Democratic Republic of the Congo, Uganda and Ivory Coast. It was first described by the British entomologist Gilbert Ernest Bryant in 1932, from specimens collected by the British entomologist Alfred Francis John Gedye from Kampala, Uganda.
