= Cheiridella =

Scientific classification
- Kingdom: Animalia
- Phylum: Arthropoda
- Clade: Pancrustacea
- Class: Insecta
- Order: Coleoptera
- Suborder: Polyphaga
- Infraorder: Cucujiformia
- Family: Chrysomelidae
- Subfamily: Eumolpinae
- Tribe: Euryopini
- Genus: Cheiridella; Jacoby, 1904

Type species
- Cheiridella zambesiana Jacoby, 1904

Genus of leaf beetles from Africa

Cheiridella is a genus of leaf beetles in the subfamily Eumolpinae. They are known from Africa.

== Species ==
- Cheiridella principis Zoia, 2017 – Príncipe, São Tomé
- Cheiridella zambesiana Jacoby, 1904 – "Estcourt, Natal" (type locality)
