= Lefevrea humeralis =

Scientific classification
- Kingdom: Animalia
- Phylum: Arthropoda
- Clade: Pancrustacea
- Class: Insecta
- Order: Coleoptera
- Suborder: Polyphaga
- Infraorder: Cucujiformia
- Family: Chrysomelidae
- Genus: Lefevrea
- Species: L. humeralis

Binomial name
- Lefevrea humeralis Weise, 1924

Species of beetle

Lefevrea humeralis is a species of leaf beetle. It is distributed in the Democratic Republic of the Congo, the Central African Republic, Uganda and South Sudan. It was described by Julius Weise in 1924.
