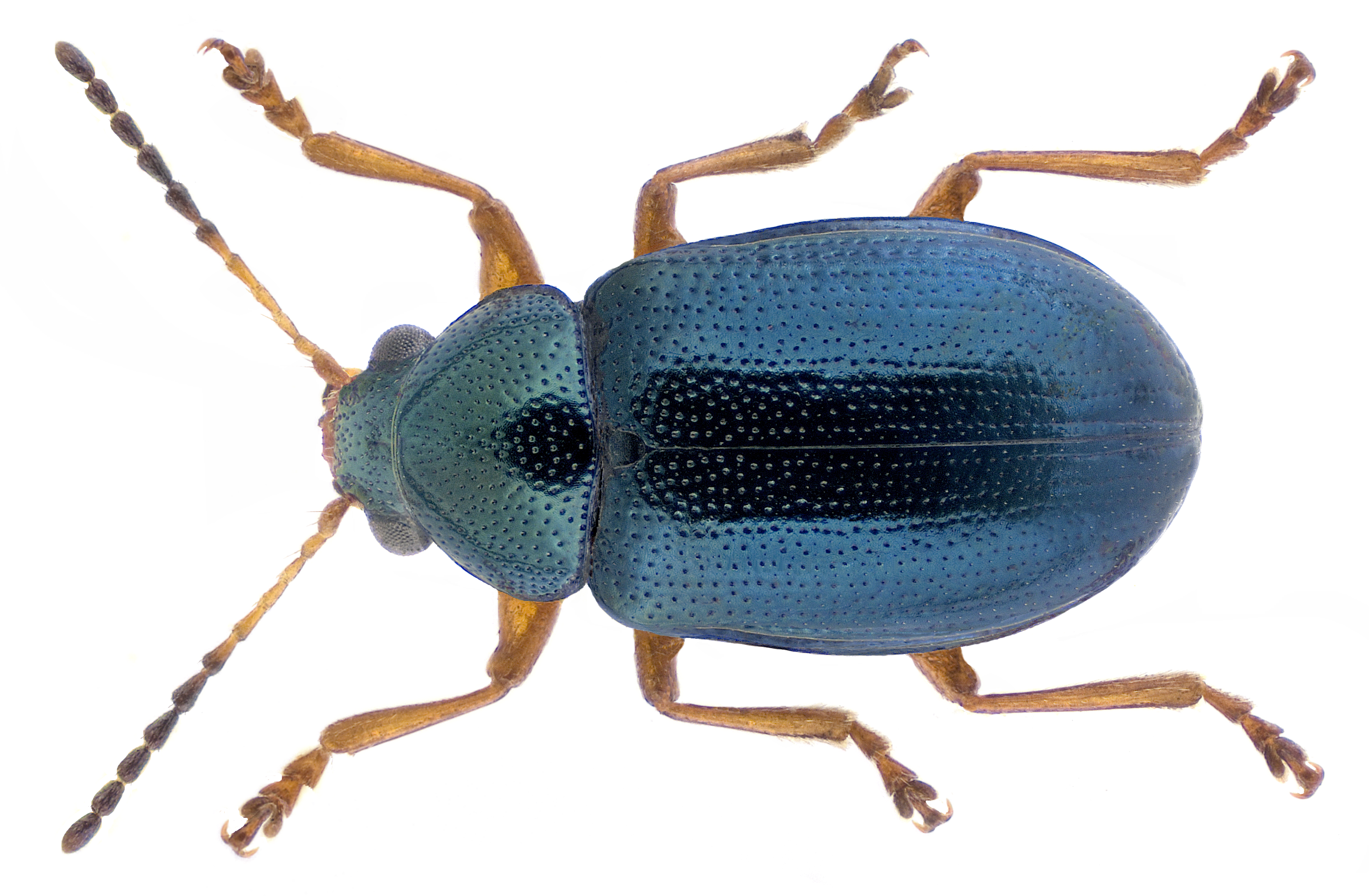
- Lefevrea turneri

Scientific classification
- Kingdom: Animalia
- Phylum: Arthropoda
- Clade: Pancrustacea
- Class: Insecta
- Order: Coleoptera
- Suborder: Polyphaga
- Infraorder: Cucujiformia
- Family: Chrysomelidae
- Subfamily: Eumolpinae
- Tribe: Euryopini; Chapuis, 1874

Synonyms
- Colasposomini Špringlová de Bechyné, 1960; Odontionopini Lefèvre, 1876; Prasoideini Clavareau, 1914

= Euryopini =

Tribe of leaf beetles

Euryopini is a tribe of leaf beetles in the subfamily Eumolpinae.

== Taxonomy ==
Following the leaf beetle classification of Seeno and Wilcox (1982), the genera of Euryopini are divided into three informal groups or "sections": Colasposomites, Euryopites and Prasoideites.

== Genera ==
The following genera belong to the tribe Euryopini:

Section Prasoideites:

- Cheiridella Jacoby, 1904
- Lefevrea Jacoby, 1897
- Lucignolo Zoia, 2010
- Microhermesia Jacoby, 1900
- Nodostonopa Jacoby, 1901
- Obelistes Lefèvre, 1885
- Odontiomorpha Jacoby, 1900
- Odontionopa Chevrolat in Dejean, 1836
- Phascus Lefèvre, 1884

Section Colasposomites:

- Cocotteumolpus Bechyné, 1957
- Colasposoma Laporte, 1833
- Deuterotrichia Bechyné, 1957
- Eprius Fairmaire, 1902
- Ferreirana Bechyné, 1958
- Melindea Lefèvre, 1884
- Paracrothinium Chen, 1940
- Platycornia Zoia, 2018
- Thysbina Weise, 1902
- Timentes Selman, 1965
- Trichostola Chapuis, 1874

Section Euryopites:

- Eumolpopsis Jacoby, 1894
- Euryope Dalman, 1824 (= Bechyneia Jolivet, 1950)

Genera not placed in a section:

- Pathius Aslam, 1968
- †Taphioporus Moseyko & Kirejtshuk, 2013
