= Thysbina pleuralis =

Scientific classification
- Kingdom: Animalia
- Phylum: Arthropoda
- Clade: Pancrustacea
- Class: Insecta
- Order: Coleoptera
- Suborder: Polyphaga
- Infraorder: Cucujiformia
- Family: Chrysomelidae
- Genus: Thysbina
- Species: T. pleuralis

Binomial name
- Thysbina pleuralis Weise, 1915

Species of beetle

Thysbina pleuralis is a species of leaf beetle of the Democratic Republic of the Congo, described by Julius Weise in 1915.
