= Lefevrea atra =

Scientific classification
- Kingdom: Animalia
- Phylum: Arthropoda
- Clade: Pancrustacea
- Class: Insecta
- Order: Coleoptera
- Suborder: Polyphaga
- Infraorder: Cucujiformia
- Family: Chrysomelidae
- Genus: Lefevrea
- Species: L. atra

Binomial name
- Lefevrea atra Bryant, 1932

Species of beetle

Lefevrea atra is a species of leaf beetle of the Democratic Republic of the Congo and Uganda. It was first described by the British entomologist Gilbert Ernest Bryant in 1932, from specimens collected by C. C. Gowday from Tero Forest, Uganda in 1912.
