= Obelistes =

Scientific classification
- Kingdom: Animalia
- Phylum: Arthropoda
- Clade: Pancrustacea
- Class: Insecta
- Order: Coleoptera
- Suborder: Polyphaga
- Infraorder: Cucujiformia
- Family: Chrysomelidae
- Subfamily: Eumolpinae
- Tribe: Euryopini
- Genus: Obelistes; Lefèvre, 1885

Type species
- Obelistes varians Lefèvre, 1885

Synonyms
- Angoleumolpus Pic, 1938; Angoleumolpus Pic, 1939

Genus of leaf beetles from Africa

Obelistes is a genus of leaf beetles in the subfamily Eumolpinae. It is known from Africa.

== Species ==
- Obelistes acutangulus Weise, 1895 – Ghana, DR Congo
- Obelistes bryanti Zoia, 2019 – Kenya
- Obelistes curtipennis (Pic, 1952) – Mozambique
- Obelistes clavareaui Burgeon, 1941 – Cameroon
- Obelistes dentatus (Bryant, 1954)
- Obelistes flavus (Pic, 1938) – Tanzania
- Obelistes fuscitarsis Weise, 1895 – Ghana
- Obelistes intermedius Burgeon, 1941 – DR Congo
- Obelistes leplaei Burgeon, 1941 – DR Congo
- Obelistes luluensis Burgeon, 1941 – DR Congo
- Obelistes maynei Burgeon, 1941 – DR Congo
- Obelistes nigrovittatus (Pic, 1939) – Angola
- Obelistes pallidicolor (Pic, 1939) – Angola
- Obelistes schoutedeni Burgeon, 1941 – DR Congo
- Obelistes subelongatus (Pic, 1940) – Angola
- Obelistes trivittatus Burgeon, 1941 – DR Congo
- Obelistes variabilis Selman, 1972 – Congo, DR Congo
- Obelistes varians Lefèvre, 1885 – Nigeria
- Obelistes villiersi (Pic, 1950) – Niger: Aïr Mountains

Synonyms:

- Obelistes nigrovittatus Bryant, 1952: renamed to Obelistes bryanti Zoia, 2019
