= Colasposoma subaureum =

Scientific classification
- Kingdom: Animalia
- Phylum: Arthropoda
- Clade: Pancrustacea
- Class: Insecta
- Order: Coleoptera
- Suborder: Polyphaga
- Infraorder: Cucujiformia
- Family: Chrysomelidae
- Genus: Colasposoma
- Subgenus: Colasposoma (Colasposoma)
- Species: C. subaureum

Binomial name
- Colasposoma subaureum Jacoby, 1900

Species of beetle

Colasposoma subaureum is a species of leaf beetle of the Democratic Republic of the Congo, described by Martin Jacoby in 1900.
