= Colasposoma akaense =

Scientific classification
- Kingdom: Animalia
- Phylum: Arthropoda
- Clade: Pancrustacea
- Class: Insecta
- Order: Coleoptera
- Suborder: Polyphaga
- Infraorder: Cucujiformia
- Family: Chrysomelidae
- Genus: Colasposoma
- Subgenus: Colasposoma (Colasposoma)
- Species: C. akaense

Binomial name
- Colasposoma akaense Selman, 1972

Synonyms
- Colasposoma akaensis (misspelling)

Species of beetle

Colasposoma akaense is a species of leaf beetles of the Democratic Republic of the Congo, described by Brian J. Selman in 1972.
