= Colasposoma grande =

Scientific classification
- Kingdom: Animalia
- Phylum: Arthropoda
- Clade: Pancrustacea
- Class: Insecta
- Order: Coleoptera
- Suborder: Polyphaga
- Infraorder: Cucujiformia
- Family: Chrysomelidae
- Genus: Colasposoma
- Subgenus: Colasposoma (Falsonerissus)
- Species: C. grande

Binomial name
- Colasposoma grande (Lefèvre, 1890)

Synonyms
- Eryxia grandis Lefèvre, 1890; Falsonerissus arabicus Pic, 1951

Species of beetle

Colasposoma grande is a species of leaf beetle found in the Arabian Peninsula and Socotra. It was first described by Édouard Lefèvre in 1890. It was originally placed in the genus Eryxia, but was moved to the genus Colasposoma (subgenus Falsonerissus) by Stefano Zoia in 2012.

A synonym of this species is Falsonerissus arabicus, described by Maurice Pic in 1951, which was the type and only species of the genus Falsonerissus. Falsonerissus is now considered a subgenus of Colasposoma.

== Subspecies ==
There are two subspecies of C. grande:

- Colasposoma grande grande (Lefèvre, 1890) – Yemen (mainland), Oman, Saudi Arabia, the United Arab Emirates
- Colasposoma grande insulare Zoia, 2012 – Yemen (Socotra)
