= Lefevrea kibonotensis =

Scientific classification
- Kingdom: Animalia
- Phylum: Arthropoda
- Clade: Pancrustacea
- Class: Insecta
- Order: Coleoptera
- Suborder: Polyphaga
- Infraorder: Cucujiformia
- Family: Chrysomelidae
- Genus: Lefevrea
- Species: L. kibonotensis

Binomial name
- Lefevrea kibonotensis Weise, 1909

Species of beetle

Lefevrea kibonotensis is a species of leaf beetle of Tanzania and the Democratic Republic of the Congo. It was first described by Julius Weise in 1909.
