= Colasposoma iturianum =

Scientific classification
- Kingdom: Animalia
- Phylum: Arthropoda
- Clade: Pancrustacea
- Class: Insecta
- Order: Coleoptera
- Suborder: Polyphaga
- Infraorder: Cucujiformia
- Family: Chrysomelidae
- Genus: Colasposoma
- Subgenus: Colasposoma (Colasposoma)
- Species: C. iturianum

Binomial name
- Colasposoma iturianum Weise, 1912

Species of beetle

Colasposoma iturianum is a species of leaf beetle in the genus Colasposoma, described by Julius Weise in 1912 in the Democratic Republic of the Congo.
