= Colasposoma subcostatum =

Scientific classification
- Kingdom: Animalia
- Phylum: Arthropoda
- Clade: Pancrustacea
- Class: Insecta
- Order: Coleoptera
- Suborder: Polyphaga
- Infraorder: Cucujiformia
- Family: Chrysomelidae
- Genus: Colasposoma
- Subgenus: Colasposoma (Colasposoma)
- Species: C. subcostatum

Binomial name
- Colasposoma subcostatum Gerstaecker, 1871

Synonyms
- Colasposoma subcostatum ab. bicolor Weise, 1902; Colasposoma subcostatum ab. cupreum Weise, 1902; Colasposoma subcostatum ab. holocyaneum Fairmaire, 1887; Colasposoma subcostatum ab. nigrum Weise, 1902; Colasposoma subcostatum ab. viridescens Weise, 1902

Species of beetle

Colasposoma subcostatum is a species of leaf beetle of East Africa and the Democratic Republic of the Congo. It was first described by Carl Eduard Adolph Gerstaecker in 1871.
