= Colasposoma viridivittatum =

Scientific classification
- Kingdom: Animalia
- Phylum: Arthropoda
- Clade: Pancrustacea
- Class: Insecta
- Order: Coleoptera
- Suborder: Polyphaga
- Infraorder: Cucujiformia
- Family: Chrysomelidae
- Genus: Colasposoma
- Subgenus: Colasposoma (Colasposoma)
- Species: C. viridivittatum

Binomial name
- Colasposoma viridivittatum Baly, 1865

Species of beetle

Colasposoma viridivittatum is a species of leaf beetle of Mali, described by Joseph Sugar Baly in 1865.
