= Thysbina bicostata =

Scientific classification
- Kingdom: Animalia
- Phylum: Arthropoda
- Clade: Pancrustacea
- Class: Insecta
- Order: Coleoptera
- Suborder: Polyphaga
- Infraorder: Cucujiformia
- Family: Chrysomelidae
- Genus: Thysbina
- Species: T. bicostata

Binomial name
- Thysbina bicostata Weise, 1902

Species of beetle

Thysbina bicostata is a species of leaf beetle of the Democratic Republic of the Congo, described by Julius Weise in 1902.
