= Lefevrea moyoensis =

Scientific classification
- Kingdom: Animalia
- Phylum: Arthropoda
- Clade: Pancrustacea
- Class: Insecta
- Order: Coleoptera
- Suborder: Polyphaga
- Infraorder: Cucujiformia
- Family: Chrysomelidae
- Genus: Lefevrea
- Species: L. moyoensis

Binomial name
- Lefevrea moyoensis Selman, 1972

Species of beetle

Lefevrea moyoensis is a species of leaf beetle. It is distributed in the Democratic Republic of the Congo and South Sudan. It was described by Brian J. Selman in 1972.
