= Timentes =

Scientific classification
- Kingdom: Animalia
- Phylum: Arthropoda
- Clade: Pancrustacea
- Class: Insecta
- Order: Coleoptera
- Suborder: Polyphaga
- Infraorder: Cucujiformia
- Family: Chrysomelidae
- Subfamily: Eumolpinae
- Tribe: Euryopini
- Genus: Timentes; Selman, 1965
- Species: T. camerunensis

Binomial name
- Timentes camerunensis (Pic, 1953)

Synonyms
- Thysbina camerunensis Pic, 1953; Timentes flavipes Selman, 1965

Genus of leaf beetles from Africa

Timentes is a genus of leaf beetles in the subfamily Eumolpinae. It contains only one species, Timentes camerunensis, from Cameroon and possibly Tanzania. It is closely related to Thysbina.

The genus was originally erected by Brian J. Selman for a single species, Timentes flavipes. According to Selman, the genus and species were originally named by Julius Weise at an unknown date (probably 1885–6), from material in the Jacoby collection found at the Natural History Museum, London. However, they were not described until 1965 by Selman himself, who preserved Weise's names for them. The holotype of T. flavipes has a label that gives its locality as "East Africa" without further indication, though it was thought by Selman to probably come from Tanganyika in Tanzania.

In 2019, Stefano Zoia found that Timentes flavipes was a junior synonym of Thysbina camerunensis, a species described by Maurice Pic from Edéa, Cameroon in 1953, and moved the latter species to Timentes.
