= Colasposoma abdominale =

Scientific classification
- Kingdom: Animalia
- Phylum: Arthropoda
- Clade: Pancrustacea
- Class: Insecta
- Order: Coleoptera
- Suborder: Polyphaga
- Infraorder: Cucujiformia
- Family: Chrysomelidae
- Genus: Colasposoma
- Subgenus: Colasposoma (Colasposoma)
- Species: C. abdominale

Binomial name
- Colasposoma abdominale Baly, 1864

Species of beetle

Colasposoma abdominale is a species of leaf beetle from Botswana and the former Katanga Province of the Democratic Republic of the Congo. It was first described from Lake Ngami by Joseph Sugar Baly in 1864. It is closely related to Colasposoma fairmairei (which is possibly only a race of C. abdominale), differing from it by the reddish underside of the abdomen. Its length ranges from 7.5 to 11 mm.
