= Phascus shoemakeri =

Scientific classification
- Kingdom: Animalia
- Phylum: Arthropoda
- Clade: Pancrustacea
- Class: Insecta
- Order: Coleoptera
- Suborder: Polyphaga
- Infraorder: Cucujiformia
- Family: Chrysomelidae
- Genus: Phascus
- Species: P. shoemakeri

Binomial name
- Phascus shoemakeri Selman, 1972

Species of beetle

Phascus shoemakeri is a species of leaf beetle reported from the Republic of the Congo and the Democratic Republic of the Congo. It was first described from Garamba National Park by Brian J. Selman in 1972. Its host plants include Canthium sp., Erythrophleum guineense and Eriosema psoraleoides, and it was also collected on Scleria, Urena lobata and Bridelia micrantha.
