= Pathius maculatus =

Scientific classification
- Kingdom: Animalia
- Phylum: Arthropoda
- Clade: Pancrustacea
- Class: Insecta
- Order: Coleoptera
- Suborder: Polyphaga
- Infraorder: Cucujiformia
- Family: Chrysomelidae
- Genus: Pathius
- Species: P. maculatus

Binomial name
- Pathius maculatus (Bryant, 1957)

Synonyms
- Taphius maculatus Bryant, 1957

Species of beetle

Pathius maculatus is a species of leaf beetle of Yemen, described by Gilbert Ernest Bryant in 1957.
