= Lefevrea signata =

Scientific classification
- Kingdom: Animalia
- Phylum: Arthropoda
- Clade: Pancrustacea
- Class: Insecta
- Order: Coleoptera
- Suborder: Polyphaga
- Infraorder: Cucujiformia
- Family: Chrysomelidae
- Genus: Lefevrea
- Species: L. signata

Binomial name
- Lefevrea signata Weise, 1924

Species of beetle

Lefevrea signata is a species of leaf beetle of the Democratic Republic of the Congo, described by Julius Weise in 1924.
