= Colasposoma velutinum =

Scientific classification
- Kingdom: Animalia
- Phylum: Arthropoda
- Clade: Pancrustacea
- Class: Insecta
- Order: Coleoptera
- Suborder: Polyphaga
- Infraorder: Cucujiformia
- Family: Chrysomelidae
- Genus: Colasposoma
- Subgenus: Colasposoma (Colasposoma)
- Species: C. velutinum

Binomial name
- Colasposoma velutinum Lefèvre, 1885

Species of beetle

Colasposoma velutinum is a species of leaf beetle of Mali, and Senegal, described by Édouard Lefèvre in 1885.
