= Colasposoma atrocyaneum =

Scientific classification
- Kingdom: Animalia
- Phylum: Arthropoda
- Clade: Pancrustacea
- Class: Insecta
- Order: Coleoptera
- Suborder: Polyphaga
- Infraorder: Cucujiformia
- Family: Chrysomelidae
- Genus: Colasposoma
- Subgenus: Colasposoma (Colasposoma)
- Species: C. atrocyaneum

Binomial name
- Colasposoma atrocyaneum Zoia, 2012

Species of beetle

Colasposoma atrocyaneum is a species of leaf beetle endemic to Socotra. It was described by Stefano Zoia in 2012. The species name refers to the dark blue color of nearly all the specimens examined, though the species can also have a green color.
