= Colasposoma hajeki =

Scientific classification
- Kingdom: Animalia
- Phylum: Arthropoda
- Clade: Pancrustacea
- Class: Insecta
- Order: Coleoptera
- Suborder: Polyphaga
- Infraorder: Cucujiformia
- Family: Chrysomelidae
- Genus: Colasposoma
- Subgenus: Colasposoma (Colasposoma)
- Species: C. hajeki

Binomial name
- Colasposoma hajeki Zoia, 2012

Species of beetle

Colasposoma hajeki is a species of leaf beetle endemic to Socotra. It was described by Stefano Zoia in 2012. The species is named after Jiří Hájek, who collected some of the material studied.
