= Colasposoma perlatum =

Scientific classification
- Kingdom: Animalia
- Phylum: Arthropoda
- Clade: Pancrustacea
- Class: Insecta
- Order: Coleoptera
- Suborder: Polyphaga
- Infraorder: Cucujiformia
- Family: Chrysomelidae
- Genus: Colasposoma
- Subgenus: Colasposoma (Colasposoma)
- Species: C. perlatum

Binomial name
- Colasposoma perlatum Harold, 1880

Species of beetle

Colasposoma perlatum is a species of leaf beetle of Angola and the Democratic Republic of the Congo. It was first described by the German entomologist Edgar von Harold in 1880.
