= Colasposoma densatum =

Scientific classification
- Kingdom: Animalia
- Phylum: Arthropoda
- Clade: Pancrustacea
- Class: Insecta
- Order: Coleoptera
- Suborder: Polyphaga
- Infraorder: Cucujiformia
- Family: Chrysomelidae
- Genus: Colasposoma
- Subgenus: Colasposoma (Colasposoma)
- Species: C. densatum

Binomial name
- Colasposoma densatum Fairmaire, 1887

Species of beetle

Colasposoma densatum is a species of leaf beetle of Saudi Arabia and Yemen described by Léon Fairmaire in 1887.
