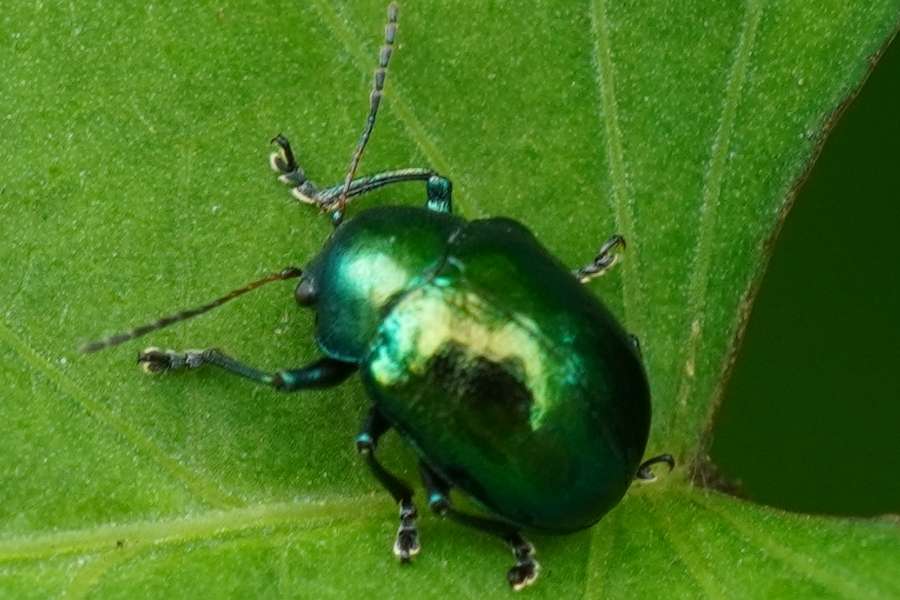

Scientific classification
- Kingdom: Animalia
- Phylum: Arthropoda
- Clade: Pancrustacea
- Class: Insecta
- Order: Coleoptera
- Suborder: Polyphaga
- Infraorder: Cucujiformia
- Family: Chrysomelidae
- Genus: Colasposoma
- Subgenus: Colasposoma (Colasposoma)
- Species: C. dauricum

Binomial name
- Colasposoma dauricum (Mannerheim, 1849)

Synonyms
- Acis daurica Mannerheim, 1849; Colasposoma cyaneum Motschulsky, 1860; Colasposoma mongolicum Motschulsky, 1860

= Colasposoma dauricum =

Species of beetle

Colasposoma dauricum is a species of leaf beetle from eastern Asia. It was first described by Carl Gustaf Mannerheim in 1849. It is known as a pest of sweet potatoes.

C. dauricum and the similar species Colasposoma viridicoeruleum (formerly known as Colasposoma auripenne) are sometimes considered to be a single species, with C. dauricum dauricum as the northern subspecies, and C. dauricum auripenne as the southern subspecies.

== Distribution ==
C. dauricum is known from Russia (Siberia and Far East), Kazakhstan, Mongolia, China (North and Northeast), Taiwan, North Korea, South Korea and Japan. Since 2010, C. dauricum has also been recorded from Piedmont, Italy, where it is an invasive species.
