= Obelistes variabilis =

Scientific classification
- Kingdom: Animalia
- Phylum: Arthropoda
- Clade: Pancrustacea
- Class: Insecta
- Order: Coleoptera
- Suborder: Polyphaga
- Infraorder: Cucujiformia
- Family: Chrysomelidae
- Genus: Obelistes
- Species: O. variabilis

Binomial name
- Obelistes variabilis Selman, 1972

Species of beetle

Obelistes variabilis is a species of leaf beetle reported from the Republic of the Congo and the Democratic Republic of the Congo. It was first described from Garamba National Park by Brian J. Selman in 1972. Its host plants include Anona chrysobotrya var. senegalensis, and it was also collected on Erythrophleum guineense, oak foliage, and the base of the trunk of Vitex doniana.
