= Euryope subserricornis =

Scientific classification
- Kingdom: Animalia
- Phylum: Arthropoda
- Clade: Pancrustacea
- Class: Insecta
- Order: Coleoptera
- Suborder: Polyphaga
- Infraorder: Cucujiformia
- Family: Chrysomelidae
- Genus: Euryope
- Species: E. subserricornis

Binomial name
- Euryope subserricornis (Latreille, 1806)

Synonyms
- Cryptocephalus subserricornis Latreille, 1806; Ecranus nigripes Walker, 1871; Eumolpus quadrimaculatus Olivier, 1808; Eumolpus ruber Latreille, 1807; Euryope rubra (Latreille, 1807)

Species of beetle

Euryope subserricornis is a species of leaf beetle of Saudi Arabia Yemen, and Egypt described by Pierre André Latreille in 1806.
