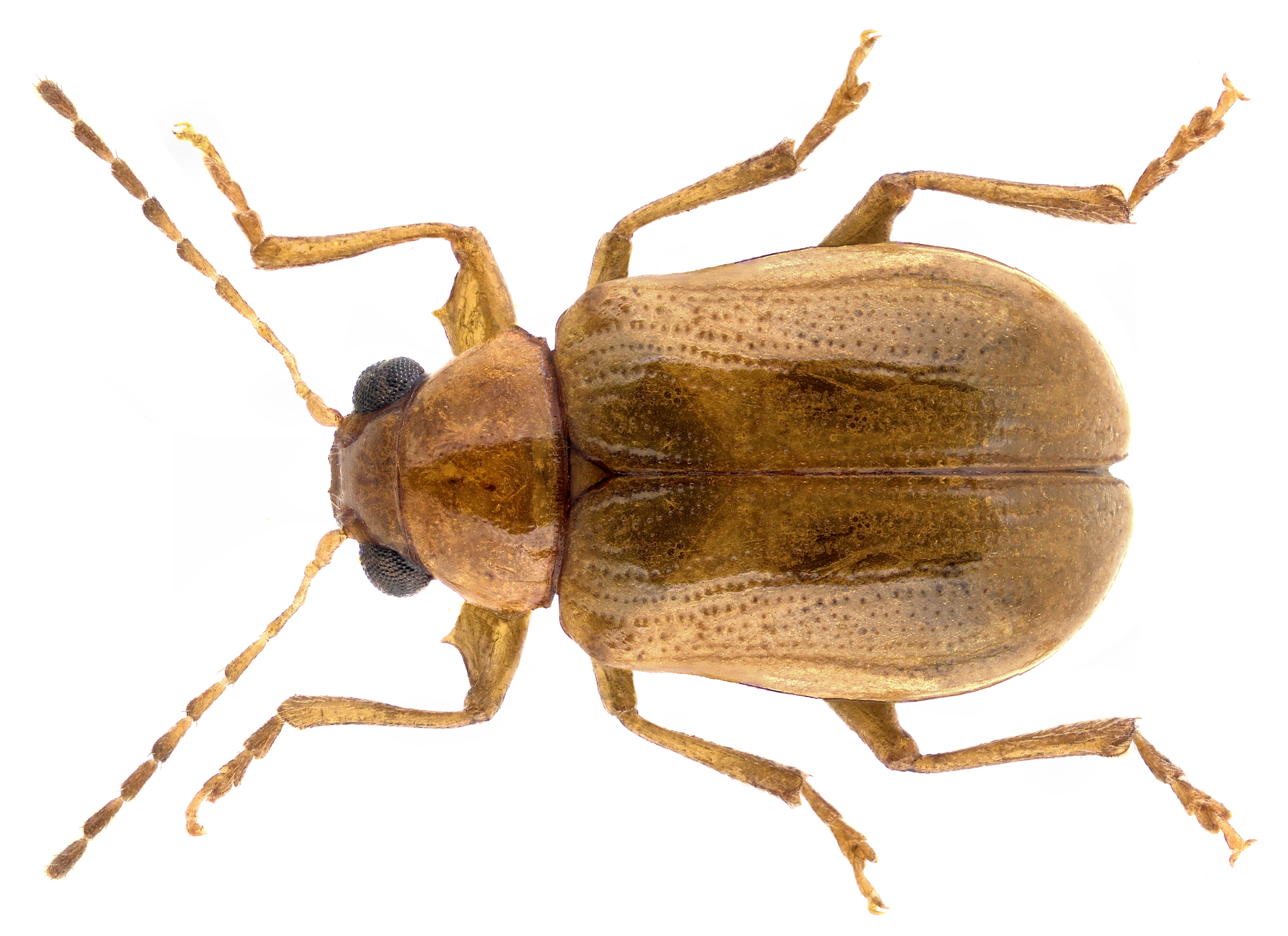
- Phascus bicolor

Scientific classification
- Kingdom: Animalia
- Phylum: Arthropoda
- Clade: Pancrustacea
- Class: Insecta
- Order: Coleoptera
- Suborder: Polyphaga
- Infraorder: Cucujiformia
- Family: Chrysomelidae
- Subfamily: Eumolpinae
- Tribe: Euryopini
- Genus: Phascus; Lefèvre, 1884

Type species
- Phascus maculatus Lefèvre, 1884

= Phascus =

Genus of leaf beetles from Africa

Phascus is a genus of leaf beetles in the subfamily Eumolpinae. It is known from Africa and the Arabian Peninsula.

== Species ==
- Phascus bicolor Weise, 1904 – Kenya
- Phascus bredoi Burgeon, 1941 – Uganda, Rwanda, DR Congo
- Phascus chopardi (Pic, 1950) – Niger: Aïr Mountains
- Phascus cruciatus Selman, 1972 – DR Congo
- Phascus denisoffi Selman, 1972 – DR Congo
- Phascus fulvus Lefèvre, 1884 – Tanzania
- Phascus instriatus (Pic, 1949) – Ethiopia
- Phascus lineatocollis Burgeon, 1941 – DR Congo
- Phascus martini Selman, 1972 – DR Congo
- Phascus multisulcatus Burgeon, 1941 – DR Congo
- Phascus occidentalis Weise, 1912 – Cameroon, DR Congo
- Phascus pallidus Lefèvre, 1884 – Eritrea, Saudi Arabia, Namibia, Kenya, Zambia
- Phascus pilosus Burgeon, 1941 – DR Congo
- Phascus reticulaticollis Burgeon, 1941 – DR Congo
- Phascus ruandanus Burgeon, 1941 – Rwanda
- Phascus shoemakeri Selman, 1972 – DR Congo, Congo
- Phascus suturalis Burgeon, 1941 – DR Congo
