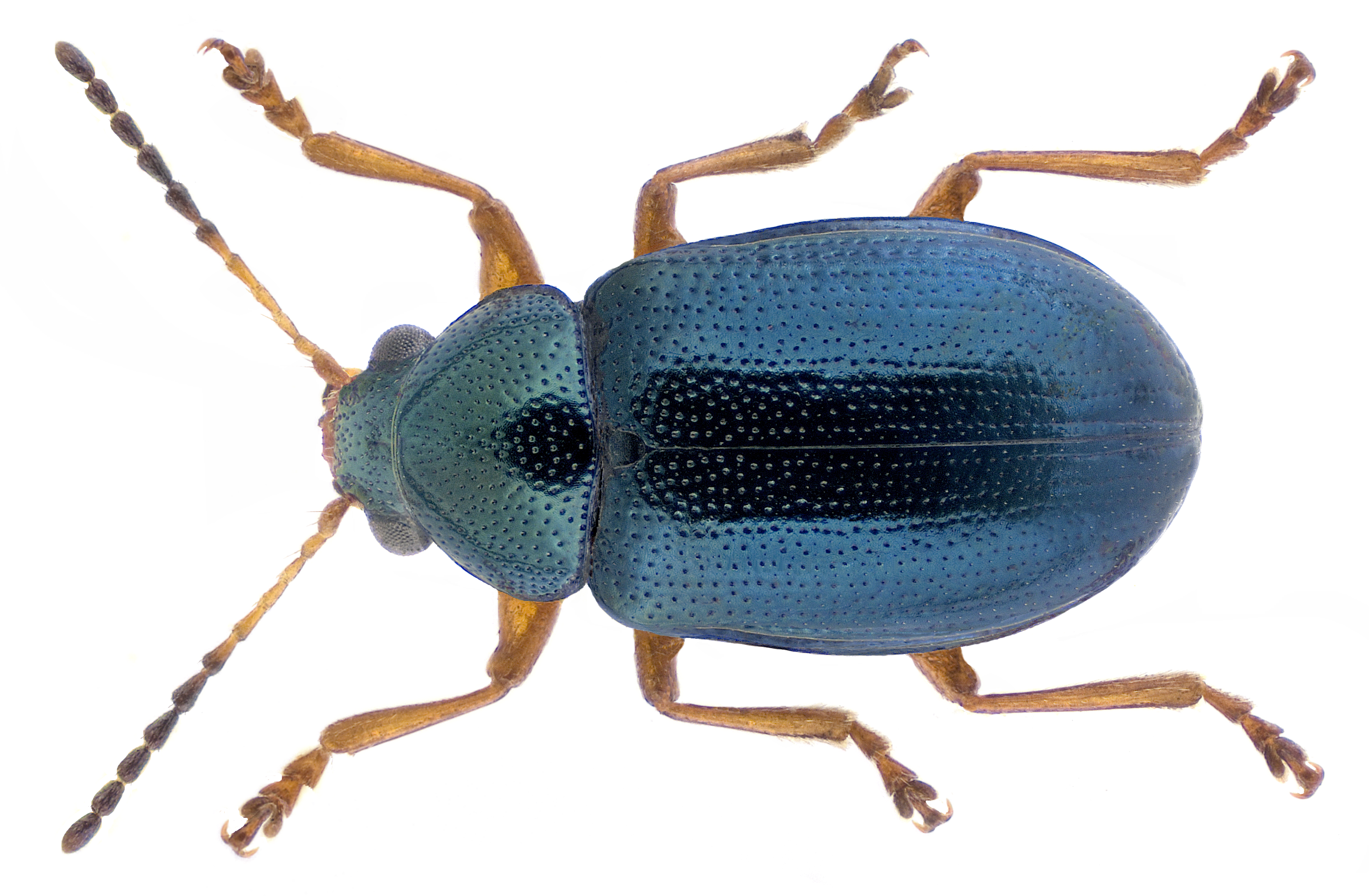
- Lefevrea turneri

Scientific classification
- Kingdom: Animalia
- Phylum: Arthropoda
- Clade: Pancrustacea
- Class: Insecta
- Order: Coleoptera
- Suborder: Polyphaga
- Infraorder: Cucujiformia
- Family: Chrysomelidae
- Subfamily: Eumolpinae
- Tribe: Euryopini
- Genus: Lefevrea; Jacoby, 1897

= Lefevrea =

Genus of leaf beetles from Africa

Lefevrea is a genus of leaf beetles in the subfamily Eumolpinae. It is distributed in Africa.

== Species ==
- Lefevrea abdominalis Jacoby, 1897
- Lefevrea aeneicollis Jacoby, 1897
- Lefevrea aeneoviridis Bryant, 1932
- Lefevrea ancora Burgeon, 1940
- Lefevrea andrewi Selman, 1972
- Lefevrea angolensis Weise, 1908
- Lefevrea annae Burgeon, 1940
- Lefevrea atra Bryant, 1932
- Lefevrea atromaculata Bryant, 1932
- Lefevrea bicolorata Bryant, 1959
- Lefevrea bicoloripes Pic, 1939
- Lefevrea brunnea Jacoby, 1900
- Lefevrea carpenteri Bryant, 1932
- Lefevrea collina Bryant, 1954
- Lefevrea conradsi Pic, 1939
- Lefevrea costulata Weise, 1909
- Lefevrea cribricollis Pic, 1938
- Lefevrea cuprea Bryant, 1954
- Lefevrea curtipennis Pic, 1940
- Lefevrea dentatipes Pic, 1939
- Lefevrea dollmani Bryant, 1932
- Lefevrea fabianae Zoia, 2020
- Lefevrea flava Bryant, 1954
- Lefevrea fulvicollis Jacoby, 1904
- Lefevrea fulvipes Jacoby, 1897
- Lefevrea gedyei Bryant, 1932
- Lefevrea hirsuta Jacoby, 1900
- Lefevrea humeralis Weise, 1924
- Lefevrea intermedia Jacoby, 1897
- Lefevrea ivoirensis Selman, 1973
- Lefevrea kibonotensis Weise, 1909
- Lefevrea lamottei Bryant, 1954
- Lefevrea leroyi Burgeon, 1940
- Lefevrea longelytrata Burgeon, 1940
- Lefevrea magna Selman, 1972
- Lefevrea margareta Selman, 1972
- Lefevrea maynei Burgeon, 1940
- Lefevrea megacephala Burgeon, 1940
- Lefevrea metallica Bryant, 1932
- Lefevrea milnei Selman, 1973
- Lefevrea minuta Jacoby, 1897
- Lefevrea moesta Weise, 1919
- Lefevrea moyoensis Selman, 1972
- Lefevrea nigriceps Burgeon, 1940
- Lefevrea nigrocaerulea Bryant, 1932
- Lefevrea nitida Pic, 1939
- Lefevrea obscurilabris Pic, 1939
- Lefevrea pilosa Burgeon, 1940
- Lefevrea pubipennis Bryant, 1932
- Lefevrea pubiventris Bryant, 1940
- Lefevrea puncticollis Jacoby, 1897
- Lefevrea rotundata Burgeon, 1940
- Lefevrea rufa (Pic, 1941)
- Lefevrea ruficollis Pic, 1939
- Lefevrea schoutedeni Burgeon, 1940
- Lefevrea schubotzi Weise, 1915
- Lefevrea scutellaris Burgeon, 1940
- Lefevrea semistriata Jacoby, 1901
- Lefevrea signata Weise, 1924
- Lefevrea subtestacea Pic, 1939
- Lefevrea testacea Pic, 1939
- Lefevrea thoracica Jacoby, 1901
- Lefevrea troupini Selman, 1972
- Lefevrea tunguensis Selman, 1972
- Lefevrea turneri Bryant, 1954
- Lefevrea ugandensis Bryant, 1932
- Lefevrea unifasciata Pic, 1939
- Lefevrea uninotata Pic, 1938
- Lefevrea viridescens Pic, 1939
- Lefevrea wittei Burgeon, 1942
