= Ennodius murrayi =

Scientific classification
- Kingdom: Animalia
- Phylum: Arthropoda
- Clade: Pancrustacea
- Class: Insecta
- Order: Coleoptera
- Suborder: Polyphaga
- Infraorder: Cucujiformia
- Family: Chrysomelidae
- Genus: Ennodius
- Species: E. murrayi

Binomial name
- Ennodius murrayi (Chapuis, 1874)

Synonyms
- Enipeus murrayi Chapuis, 1874; Thysbina gabonica Pic, 1952

Species of beetle

Ennodius murrayi is a species of leaf beetle of Guinea, Ivory Coast, Nigeria, Cameroon, Equatorial Guinea (including Bioko), the Republic of the Congo and the Democratic Republic of the Congo, described by Félicien Chapuis in 1874.
