= Ennodius (beetle) =

Scientific classification
- Kingdom: Animalia
- Phylum: Arthropoda
- Clade: Pancrustacea
- Class: Insecta
- Order: Coleoptera
- Suborder: Polyphaga
- Infraorder: Cucujiformia
- Family: Chrysomelidae
- Subfamily: Eumolpinae
- Tribe: Bromiini
- Genus: Ennodius; Lefèvre, 1885

Type species
- Enipeus murrayi Chapuis, 1874

Synonyms
- Enipeus Chapuis, 1874 (preoccupied)

Genus of leaf beetles from Africa

Ennodius is a genus of leaf beetles in the subfamily Eumolpinae. It is known from Africa.

== Species ==
- Ennodius caeruleus (Pic, 1952)
- Ennodius murrayi (Chapuis, 1874)
- Ennodius orientalis Kuntzen, 1912
