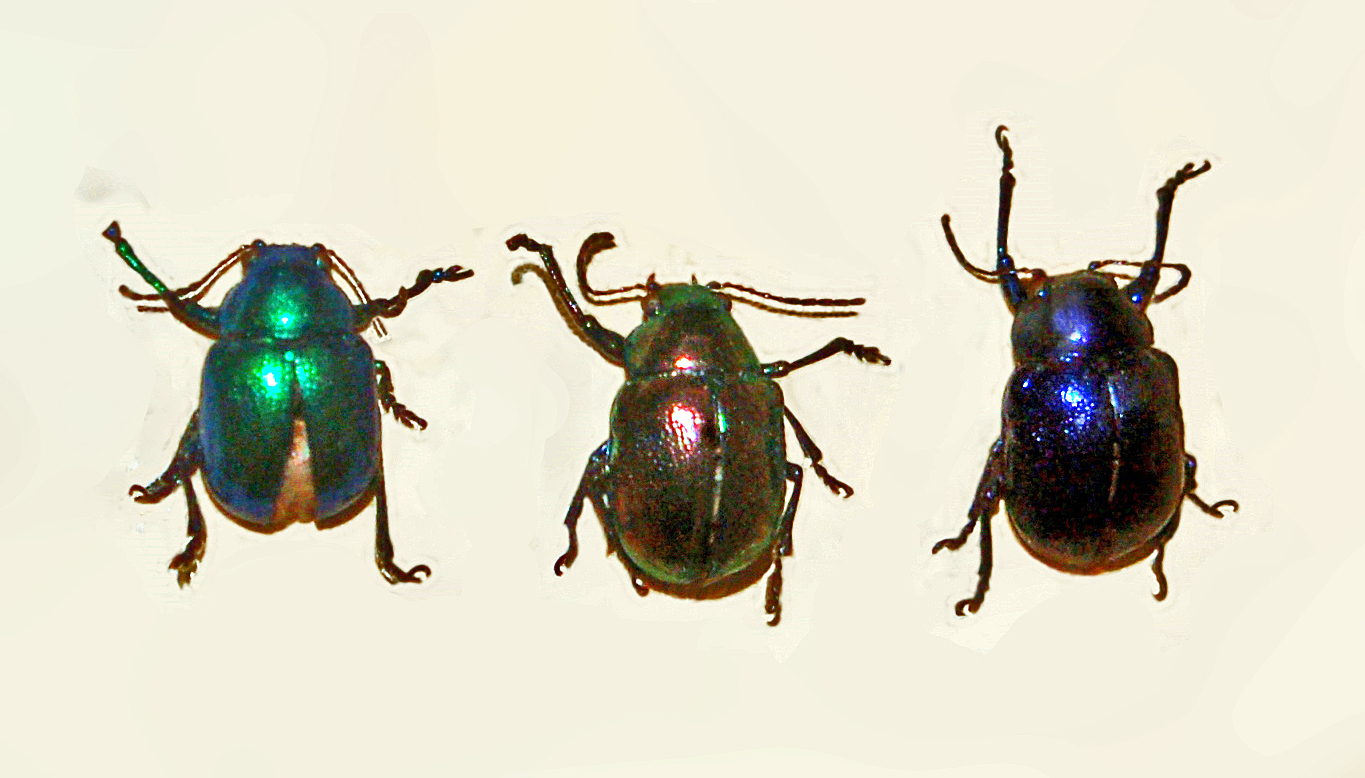
- Colasposoma viridicoeruleum

Scientific classification
- Kingdom: Animalia
- Phylum: Arthropoda
- Clade: Pancrustacea
- Class: Insecta
- Order: Coleoptera
- Suborder: Polyphaga
- Infraorder: Cucujiformia
- Family: Chrysomelidae
- Subfamily: Eumolpinae
- Tribe: Euryopini
- Genus: Colasposoma; Laporte, 1833

Type species
- Colasposoma senegalense Laporte, 1833

Synonyms
- Acis Chevrolat, 1836 (nec Billberg, 1820); Thysbe Dejean, 1836 (Nom. Nud.); Ballatro Gistel, 1848; Thysbe J. Thomson, 1858; Palesida Harold, 1874; Pseudomacetes Linell, 1895; Dasychlorus Fairmaire, 1898; Cheiriphyle Jacoby, 1901; Chiriphyle Auctt. (misspelling); Anwarullahia Abdullah & Qureshi, 1969

= Colasposoma =

Genus of leaf beetles

Colasposoma is a genus of leaf beetles in the subfamily Eumolpinae. It includes over 200 species, with over 150 described from Africa, over 50 from continental Asia, seven from the Philippines, seven from Malaysia and Indonesia, and a single species from Australia. However, the true number of species in the genus should be much lower, as almost all species descriptions were based on the color and sculpture of their upper sides, characters now known to be too variable for taxonomic purposes, and therefore many of them are at best only color variations of other species.

Species of Colasposoma are known to feed on plants of the family Convolvulaceae, especially on the genera Ipomoea and Argyreia. Some species, such as C. sellatum, C. auripenne (now known as C. viridicoeruleum) and C. dauricum, are known as pests of sweet potatoes. The larvae live in soil on the roots, while adults feed on the leaves. Pupation also takes place in the soil.

== List of species ==
Subgenus Colasposoma Laporte, 1833

- Colasposoma abdominale Baly, 1864
- Colasposoma acaciae Bryant, 1944
- Colasposoma aemulum Lefèvre, 1886
- Colasposoma aeneicolor Pic, 1939
- Colasposoma aeneoviolaceum Burgeon, 1941
  - Colasposoma aeneoviolaceum aeneoviolaceum Burgeon, 1941
  - Colasposoma aeneoviolaceum elisabethae Burgeon, 1941
- Colasposoma akaense Selman, 1972
- Colasposoma albovillosum Jacoby, 1908 – Bengal
- Colasposoma alutaceum Jacoby, 1900
- Colasposoma amplicolle Lefèvre, 1877
- Colasposoma angolense Pic, 1939
- Colasposoma antennale Jacoby, 1881
- Colasposoma apicale Jacoby, 1881
- Colasposoma apicipenne Tan, 1983 – Southwestern China (Yunnan)
- Colasposoma ardens Harold, 1879
- Colasposoma aruwimiense Gahan, 1892
- Colasposoma atrocyaneum Zoia, 2012 – Socotra
- Colasposoma aurichalcicum (J. Thomson, 1858)
- Colasposoma auripes Jacoby, 1894
  - Colasposoma auripes auripes Jacoby, 1894
  - Colasposoma auripes kafakumbae Burgeon, 1941
- Colasposoma austerum Zoia, 2012 – Socotra
- Colasposoma balyi Jacoby, 1904
- Colasposoma basicostatum Weise, 1919
- Colasposoma bedeli Achard, 1923
- Colasposoma beiraense Jacoby, 1904
- Colasposoma benguelanum Achard, 1924
- Colasposoma benningseni Weise, 1902
- Colasposoma bicallosum Lefèvre, 1891 – Bengal
- Colasposoma birmanicum Medvedev, 2007
- Colasposoma blandum Weise, 1904
- Colasposoma bonvouloiri Lefèvre, 1877
- Colasposoma bottegoi Jacoby, 1899
- Colasposoma brevepilosum Zoia, 2012 – Socotra
  - Colasposoma brevepilosum brevepilosum Zoia, 2012
  - Colasposoma brevepilosum maritimum Zoia, 2012
  - Colasposoma brevepilosum orientale Zoia, 2012
- Colasposoma camerunense Jacoby, 1903
- Colasposoma chailluensis Selman, 1970
- Colasposoma chapuisi (Harold, 1874)
- Colasposoma chloris Lefèvre, 1877
- Colasposoma clavareaui Jacoby, 1908 – Southern India (Pondicherry)
- Colasposoma coerulescens Motschulsky, 1860 – Myanmar
- Colasposoma coffeae Kolbe, 1911
- Colasposoma collare Achard, 1923
- Colasposoma colmanti Burgeon, 1941
- Colasposoma compactum Gerstaecker, 1871
- Colasposoma concinnum Weise, 1905
- Colasposoma conradi Jacoby, 1900
- Colasposoma consimile Gahan, 1909
- Colasposoma costatum Harold, 1877
- Colasposoma crampeli Pic, 1941
- Colasposoma crenulatum Gerstaecker, 1855
  - Colasposoma crenulatum crenulatum Gerstaecker, 1855
  - Colasposoma crenulatum karibaense Zoia, 2007
- Colasposoma curtepilosum Pic, 1942
- Colasposoma curvipes Jacoby, 1901
- Colasposoma cyaneicorne Pic, 1932 – Madagascar
- Colasposoma cyaneocupreum Fairmaire, 1887
- Colasposoma dahomeyanum Aslam, 1968
- Colasposoma dauricum (Mannerheim, 1849) – China (North and Northeast), Japan, Kazakhstan, Mongolia, Russia (Siberia and Far East), North Korea, South Korea
- Colasposoma davidi Lefèvre, 1887 – Southwestern China (Yunnan)
- Colasposoma densatum Fairmaire, 1887
- Colasposoma dentaticolle Pic, 1953
- Colasposoma dentipes (Fabricius, 1801) – India
- Colasposoma distinctum Baly, 1867 – Philippines
- Colasposoma diversipenne Pic, 1939
- Colasposoma downesii Baly, 1862
  - Colasposoma downesii asperatum Lefèvre, 1885 – Southwestern China (Yunnan), India, Andaman Islands, Southeast Asia
  - Colasposoma downesii downesii Baly, 1862 – Bhutan, Southwestern China (Xizang), India, Nepal, Southeast Asia
- Colasposoma ertli Weise, 1905
- Colasposoma erythreanum Pic, 1939
- Colasposoma fairmairei Lefèvre, 1877
  - Colasposoma fairmairei fairmairei Lefèvre, 1877
  - Colasposoma fairmairei katangense Burgeon, 1941
- Colasposoma favareli Pic, 1938
- Colasposoma flavipes Harold, 1877
- Colasposoma flavolimbatum (Pic, 1905)
- Colasposoma fulgidipenne Achard, 1923
- Colasposoma fulgidum Lefèvre, 1877
- Colasposoma fulvipes Lefèvre, 1877
- Colasposoma gabonense Jacoby, 1894
- Colasposoma geminatum Weise, 1922 – Philippines
- Colasposoma geniculatum Weise, 1905
- Colasposoma gibbicolle Jacoby, 1881
- Colasposoma gloriosum Weise, 1902
- Colasposoma haefligeri Weise, 1906
- Colasposoma hajeki Zoia, 2012 – Socotra
- Colasposoma hirsutum Burgeon, 1941
- Colasposoma holasi Pic, 1953
- Colasposoma homolamprum Fairmaire, 1902 – Madagascar
- Colasposoma inconstans Baly, 1864 – Sulawesi
- Colasposoma instabile Harold, 1877
- Colasposoma iturianum Weise, 1912
- Colasposoma jacksoni Bryant, 1957
- Colasposoma jucundum Lefèvre, 1877
- Colasposoma keyense Pic, 1943 – Kai Islands
- Colasposoma kindaense Burgeon, 1941
- Colasposoma langeri Zoia, 2020
- Colasposoma laticolle Jacoby, 1900 – Bengal, Nepal
- Colasposoma laticorne (J. Thomson, 1858)
- Colasposoma lividipes Jacoby, 1903 – Southern India, Sri Lanka
- Colasposoma longipes Jacoby, 1881
- Colasposoma lucubense Brancsik, 1893 – Madagascar
- Colasposoma luluense Burgeon, 1941
- Colasposoma macrocnemis Burgeon, 1941
- Colasposoma madagassum Harold, 1877 – Madagascar
- Colasposoma madoni Pic, 1942
- Colasposoma magnificum Bryant, 1957
- Colasposoma marshalli Jacoby, 1898
- Colasposoma mauricei Medvedev, 2003 – India
- Colasposoma mediocre Fairmaire, 1902 – Madagascar
- Colasposoma melancholicum Jacoby, 1881
- Colasposoma metallicum Clark, 1865 – India, Andaman Islands, Southeast Asia
- Colasposoma micheli Pic, 1952
- Colasposoma mirabile Jacoby, 1904
- Colasposoma monardi Pic, 1939
- Colasposoma monticola Weise, 1909
- Colasposoma multipunctatum Jacoby, 1889 – Myanmar
- Colasposoma neavei Bryant, 1957
- Colasposoma nepalense Kimoto, 2001
- Colasposoma nigriventre Baly, 1867 – India, Sri Lanka, Myanmar, Peninsular Malaysia, Sumatra
- Colasposoma nigroaeneum Motschulsky, 1860 – Myanmar
- Colasposoma nitens Weise, 1919
- Colasposoma obscurum Jacoby, 1900
- Colasposoma ornatum Jacoby, 1881 – Afghanistan, Pakistan, India, Sangir
- Colasposoma ovatum Achard, 1923
- Colasposoma overlaeti Burgeon, 1941
- Colasposoma ovulum Lefèvre, 1885
- Colasposoma parvicolle Burgeon, 1941
- Colasposoma parvulum Lefèvre, 1890
- Colasposoma perlatum Harold, 1880
- Colasposoma perrieri Jacoby, 1904 – Madagascar
- Colasposoma piceitarse Jacoby, 1904
- Colasposoma pilosum Lefèvre, 1885
- Colasposoma pilosum Pic, 1943 (homonym of previous) – India
- Colasposoma plumbeum Jacoby, 1898
- Colasposoma posticum Weise, 1905
- Colasposoma prasinum Clavareau, 1909
- Colasposoma pretiosum Baly, 1860 – Southwestern China, India, Nepal, Southeast Asia
- Colasposoma propinquum Baly, 1867 – Borneo
- Colasposoma pubescens Lefèvre, 1877
- Colasposoma pubipenne Jacoby, 1898
- Colasposoma purcharti Zoia, 2012 – Socotra
- Colasposoma purpuratum Motschulsky, 1860 – Java
- Colasposoma purpureicolor Pic, 1939
- Colasposoma purpureipenne Pic, 1941
- Colasposoma purpureocinctum Pic, 1942
- Colasposoma pusillum Jacoby, 1904
- Colasposoma pustuliferum Pic, 1939
- Colasposoma quadrimaculatum Weise, 1919
- Colasposoma reygnaulti Pic, 1942
- Colasposoma robustum Jacoby, 1881 – Southern India, Sri Lanka
- Colasposoma ruficolle Bryant, 1957
- Colasposoma rufimembris Pic, 1942
- Colasposoma rufipes (Fabricius, 1793) (?)
- Colasposoma rufipes Jacoby, 1900 (homonym of previous) – Northeast India
- Colasposoma rugatum Achard, 1923
- Colasposoma rugulosum Baly, 1867 – Peninsular Malaysia
- Colasposoma rutilans (Klug, 1833) – Madagascar
- Colasposoma sansibaricum Harold, 1879
- Colasposoma scapulatum Fairmaire, 1903 – Madagascar
- Colasposoma scutellare Lefèvre, 1877
- Colasposoma sellatum Baly, 1878 – Australia, Papua New Guinea
- Colasposoma semiasperum Fairmaire, 1902 – Madagascar
- Colasposoma semicostatum Jacoby, 1908 – Northeast India, Nepal
- Colasposoma semihirsutum Jacoby, 1898
- Colasposoma semipurpureum Jacoby, 1901 – Madagascar
- Colasposoma senegalense Laporte, 1833
- Colasposoma senegalense (Klug, 1835) (homonym of previous)
- Colasposoma separatum Lefèvre, 1877
- Colasposoma sheppardi Jacoby, 1904
- Colasposoma splendidum (Fabricius, 1792) – Java, Sulawesi, Peninsular Malaysia, "East India"
- Colasposoma subaureum Jacoby, 1900
- Colasposoma subcostatum Gerstaecker, 1871
- Colasposoma sublaeve Fairmaire, 1903 – Madagascar
- Colasposoma subnigrum Pic, 1939
- Colasposoma subopacum Jacoby, 1908 – India, Myanmar
- Colasposoma subopacum Weise, 1919 (homonym of previous)
- Colasposoma subpurpureum Pic, 1942
- Colasposoma subsericum Harold, 1879
- Colasposoma sumptuosum Weise, 1906
- Colasposoma suturale Zoia, 2020
- Colasposoma tarsale Jacoby, 1881
- Colasposoma tenenbaumi Pic, 1943 – "Himalaya"
- Colasposoma tibiale Baly, 1878
- Colasposoma timorense Pic, 1943 – Timor
- Colasposoma tinantae Burgeon, 1941
- Colasposoma tokeri Bryant, 1957
- Colasposoma transvalense Jacoby, 1897
- Colasposoma transversicolle Jacoby, 1889 – Myanmar
- Colasposoma tumidulum Weise, 1904
- Colasposoma unicostatum Zoia, 2012 – Socotra
- Colasposoma varendorffi Weise, 1914
- Colasposoma variabile Jacoby, 1881
- Colasposoma varicolor Fairmaire, 1887
- Colasposoma vedyi Burgeon, 1941
- Colasposoma velutinum Lefèvre, 1885
- Colasposoma versicolor Lefèvre, 1887 – Southern India, Sri Lanka
- Colasposoma vestitum J. Thomson, 1858
- Colasposoma vicinale Tan, 1983 – Southwestern China (Yunnan)
- Colasposoma villosulum Lefèvre, 1885 – Southwestern China (Yunnan), Southern India, Sri Lanka
- Colasposoma viridicoeruleum Motschulsky, 1860 – South China, India, Andaman Islands, Japan, Southeast Asia
- Colasposoma viridicolle Fairmaire, 1887 – Madagascar
- Colasposoma viridifasciatum Motschulsky, 1860 – Philippines
- Colasposoma viridinotatum Zoia, 2022
- Colasposoma viridivittatum Baly, 1865
- Colasposoma williamsi Bryant, 1957
- Colasposoma wittei Burgeon, 1941
- Colasposoma yunnanum Fairmaire, 1888 – Southwestern China (Yunnan)
- Colasposoma zavattarii Pic, 1938

Subgenus Falsonerissus Pic, 1951 (Synonyms: Iranomolpus Lopatin, 1979; Andosiomorpha Lopatin, 1981; Bezdekia Warchałowski, 2005)

- Colasposoma argentatum (Lopatin, 1981) – Iran
- Colasposoma badium (Lopatin, 1979) – Iran
- Colasposoma coracinum (Lopatin, 1996) – UAE, Oman, Iran
- Colasposoma distinguendum Zoia, 2012 – Socotra
- Colasposoma grande (Lefèvre, 1890)
  - Colasposoma grande grande (Lefèvre, 1890) – Yemen, Oman, Saudi Arabia, UAE
  - Colasposoma grande insulare Zoia, 2012 – Socotra
- Colasposoma socotranum (Gahan, 1903) – Socotra
- Colasposoma tenebrosum (Warchałowski, 2005) – Iran
- Colasposoma villosum Zoia, 2012 – Socotra

Synonyms:

- Colasposoma aeneoviride Clark, 1865: synonym of Colaspoides cuprea Baly, 1867
- Colasposoma albopilosum Pic, 1943: synonym of Colasposoma villosulum Lefèvre, 1885
- Colasposoma andrewesi Jacoby, 1895: synonym of Colasposoma downesii asperatum Lefèvre, 1885
- Colasposoma arcuateimpressum Pic, 1943: synonym of Colasposoma robustum Jacoby, 1881
- Colasposoma asperatum Fairmaire, 1902 (not C. downesii asperatum Lefèvre, 1885): renamed to Colasposoma perrieri Jacoby, 1904
- Colasposoma aureovittatum Baly, 1864: synonym of Colasposoma downesii downesii Baly, 1862
- Colasposoma auripenne Motschulsky, 1860: synonym of Colasposoma viridicoeruleum Motschulsky, 1860
- Colasposoma bicoloratum Jacoby, 1908: synonym of Colasposoma robustum Jacoby, 1881
- Colasposoma bonnevili Pic, 1943: synonym of Colasposoma pretiosum Baly, 1860
- Colasposoma castetsi Pic, 1943: synonym of Colasposoma semicostatum Jacoby, 1908
- Colasposoma coimbatorense Pic, 1943: synonym of Colasposoma robustum Jacoby, 1881
- Colasposoma collare Zoia, 2020 (not C. collare Achard, 1923): renamed to Colasposoma viridinotatum Zoia, 2022
- Colasposoma coromandeliana Jacoby, 1908: synonym of Colasposoma robustum Jacoby, 1881
- Colasposoma cumingi Baly, 1867: synonym of Colasposoma viridifasciatum Motschulsky, 1860
- Colasposoma cyaneicolle Pic, 1943: synonym of Colasposoma robustum Jacoby, 1881
- Colasposoma cyaneovittatum Pic, 1943: synonym of Colasposoma ornatum Jacoby, 1881
- Colasposoma gregarium Lefèvre, 1886: synonym of Colasposoma viridifasciatum Motschulsky, 1860
- Colasposoma madoni Pic, 1943 (not C. madoni Pic, 1942): renamed to Colasposoma mauricei Medvedev, 2003
- Colasposoma mutabile Baly, 1867: synonym of Colasposoma viridicoeruleum Motschulsky, 1860
- Colasposoma nathani Pic, 1943: synonym of Colasposoma robustum Jacoby, 1881
- Colasposoma nitidum Baly, 1867: synonym of Colasposoma distinctum Baly, 1867
- Colasposoma pradieri Lefèvre, 1877: synonym of Colasposoma laticorne (J. Thomson, 1858)
- Colasposoma prosternale Jacoby, 1908: synonym of Colasposoma downesii asperatum Lefèvre, 1885
- Colasposoma ramnadense Pic, 1943: synonym of Colasposoma semicostatum Jacoby, 1908
- Colasposoma ruficorne Pic, 1943: synonym of Colasposoma lividipes Jacoby, 1903
- Colasposoma rufipenne Pic, 1943: synonym of Colasposoma pretiosum Baly, 1860
- Colasposoma rufofemorale Pic, 1943: synonym of Colasposoma lividipes Jacoby, 1903
- Colasposoma rufum (Pic, 1941): moved to Lefevrea
- Colasposoma rugiceps Lefèvre, 1885: synonym of Colasposoma distinctum Baly, 1867
- Colasposoma rugipenne Motschulsky, 1860: moved to Colaspoides
- Colasposoma serratulum Lefèvre, 1885: synonym of Colasposoma downesii asperatum Lefèvre, 1885
- Colasposoma sparsepunctatum Pic, 1943: synonym of Colasposoma robustum Jacoby, 1881
- Colasposoma viridicinctum Pic, 1943: synonym of Colasposoma versicolor Lefèvre, 1887
- Colasposoma viridigeniculatum Pic, 1943: synonym of Colasposoma lividipes Jacoby, 1903
