= Subaeneus =

Subaeneus may refer to:

- Brachyplatys subaeneus, species of shield bugs
- Dorcadionoides subaeneus, species of beetle
- Eupogonius subaeneus, species of beetle
- Harpalus subaeneus, species of ground beetle
- Ilybius subaeneus, species of predaceous diving beetle
- Onthophagus subaeneus, species of dung beetle
- Paraivongius subaeneus, species of leaf beetle
- Stator subaeneus, species of leaf beetle
