= Mandollia =

Scientific classification
- Kingdom: Animalia
- Phylum: Arthropoda
- Clade: Pancrustacea
- Class: Insecta
- Order: Coleoptera
- Suborder: Polyphaga
- Infraorder: Cucujiformia
- Family: Chrysomelidae
- Subfamily: Eumolpinae
- Tribe: Typophorini
- Genus: Mandollia; Selman, 1965

Type species
- Rhembastus affinis Jacoby, 1900

Genus of leaf beetles from Africa

Mandollia is a genus of leaf beetles in the subfamily Eumolpinae, found in Africa. Two of its species were originally placed in Rhembastus.

== Species ==
- Mandollia affinis (Jacoby, 1900) – Zimbabwe
- Mandollia isoensis Selman, 1972 – DR Congo
- Mandollia semibrunneus (Jacoby, 1901) – Zimbabwe
