= Pseudanaesthetis rufipennis =

Scientific classification
- Kingdom: Animalia
- Phylum: Arthropoda
- Class: Insecta
- Order: Coleoptera
- Suborder: Polyphaga
- Infraorder: Cucujiformia
- Family: Cerambycidae
- Genus: Pseudanaesthetis
- Species: P. rufipennis

Binomial name
- Pseudanaesthetis rufipennis (Matsushita, 1933)

Synonyms
- Eupogonius rufipennis Matsushita, 1933

Species of beetle

Pseudanaesthetis rufipennis is a species of beetle in the family Cerambycidae. It was described by Matsushita in 1933, originally under the genus Eupogonius.
