= Paraivongius parvulus =

Scientific classification
- Kingdom: Animalia
- Phylum: Arthropoda
- Clade: Pancrustacea
- Class: Insecta
- Order: Coleoptera
- Suborder: Polyphaga
- Infraorder: Cucujiformia
- Family: Chrysomelidae
- Genus: Paraivongius
- Species: P. parvulus

Binomial name
- Paraivongius parvulus (Jacoby, 1903)

Synonyms
- Menius parvulus Jacoby, 1903; Menius viridinitens Bryant, 1954; Paraivongius viridinitens (Bryant, 1954)

Species of beetle

Paraivongius parvulus is a species of leaf beetle of West Africa (Guinea and Ivory Coast), Cameroon and the Democratic Republic of the Congo. It was first described by Martin Jacoby in 1903, as a species of the genus Menius.
