= Paraivongius viridiaeneus =

Scientific classification
- Kingdom: Animalia
- Phylum: Arthropoda
- Class: Insecta
- Order: Coleoptera
- Suborder: Polyphaga
- Infraorder: Cucujiformia
- Family: Chrysomelidae
- Genus: Paraivongius
- Species: P. viridiaeneus

Binomial name
- Paraivongius viridiaeneus (Jacoby, 1882)

Synonyms
- Menius viridiaeneus Jacoby, 1882

Species of West African leaf beetle

Paraivongius viridiaeneus is a species of leaf beetle found in West Africa which was first described by Martin Jacoby in 1882. The species was moved to Paraivongius from Menius after it and others were found to differ greatly from the type species of Menius.

The species' habitat is on the cocoa plant, and it feeds primarily on mature leaves on the plant, as well as on bark and leaf petioles. Their population spikes in November–December and is moderately higher in June–July, at the times when there is the highest concentration of mature cocoa leaves.
