= Eupogonius cyaneus =

Scientific classification
- Domain: Eukaryota
- Kingdom: Animalia
- Phylum: Arthropoda
- Class: Insecta
- Order: Coleoptera
- Suborder: Polyphaga
- Infraorder: Cucujiformia
- Family: Cerambycidae
- Genus: Eupogonius
- Species: E. cyaneus

Binomial name
- Eupogonius cyaneus Zajciw, 1962

Species of beetle

Eupogonius cyaneus is a species of beetle in the family Cerambycidae. It was described by Zajciw in 1962. It is known from Brazil.
