= Paraivongius semipiceus =

Scientific classification
- Kingdom: Animalia
- Phylum: Arthropoda
- Clade: Pancrustacea
- Class: Insecta
- Order: Coleoptera
- Suborder: Polyphaga
- Infraorder: Cucujiformia
- Family: Chrysomelidae
- Genus: Paraivongius
- Species: P. semipiceus

Binomial name
- Paraivongius semipiceus (Jacoby, 1903)

Synonyms
- Menius semipiceus Jacoby, 1903

Species of leaf beetle

Paraivongius semipiceus is a species of leaf beetle of Cameroon and the Democratic Republic of the Congo. It was first described by Martin Jacoby in 1903.

The beetle's habitat is the cocoa plant, and it is found primarily on the plant's cocoa pods or sometimes on its leaves or shoots. It feeds on the cocoa pods, and the population of the species increases in the dry dull season (roughly August to November).
