= Selmania albertiana =

Scientific classification
- Kingdom: Animalia
- Phylum: Arthropoda
- Clade: Pancrustacea
- Class: Insecta
- Order: Coleoptera
- Suborder: Polyphaga
- Infraorder: Cucujiformia
- Family: Chrysomelidae
- Genus: Selmania
- Species: S. albertiana

Binomial name
- Selmania albertiana (Burgeon, 1941)

Synonyms
- Massartia albertiana (Burgeon, 1941); Rhembastus albertianus Burgeon, 1941

Species of beetle

Selmania albertiana is a species of leaf beetle extant in the Democratic Republic of the Congo and Ivory Coast. It was first described by the Belgian entomologist Louis Burgeon in 1941.
