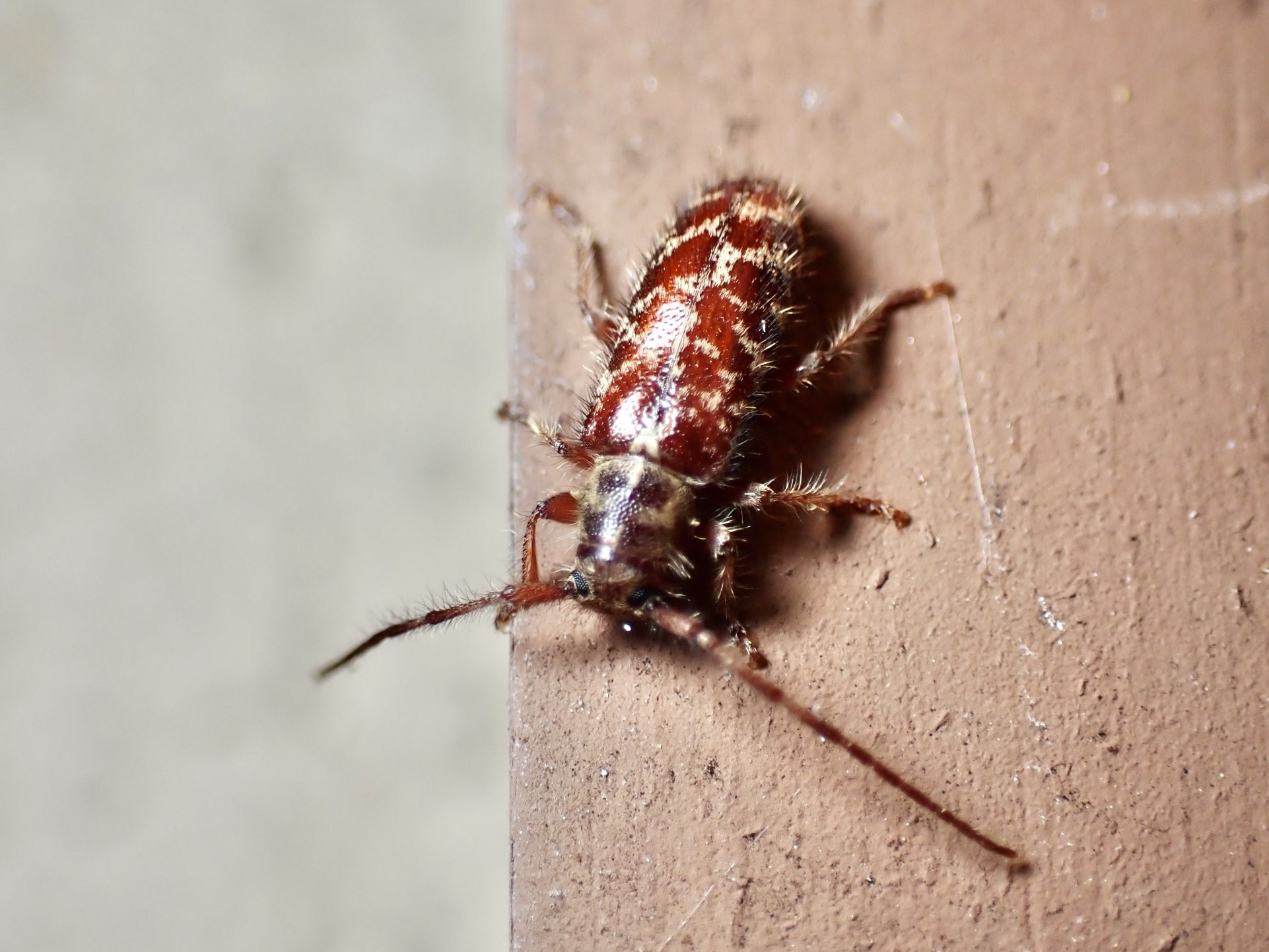

Scientific classification
- Domain: Eukaryota
- Kingdom: Animalia
- Phylum: Arthropoda
- Class: Insecta
- Order: Coleoptera
- Suborder: Polyphaga
- Infraorder: Cucujiformia
- Family: Cerambycidae
- Genus: Eupogonius
- Species: E. tomentosus

Binomial name
- Eupogonius tomentosus (Haldeman, 1847)

= Eupogonius tomentosus =

Species of beetle

Eupogonius tomentosus is a species of beetle in the family Cerambycidae. It was described by Haldeman in 1847. The species has not yet been ranked by conservation status.

Eupogonius tomentosus lives in Canada and the US, with the exception of Hawaii and Alaska.
