= Eupogonius pulcher =

Scientific classification
- Kingdom: Animalia
- Phylum: Arthropoda
- Clade: Pancrustacea
- Class: Insecta
- Order: Coleoptera
- Suborder: Polyphaga
- Infraorder: Cucujiformia
- Family: Cerambycidae
- Genus: Eupogonius
- Species: E. pulcher

Binomial name
- Eupogonius pulcher Bezark & Santos‑Silva, 2023

Species of beetle

Eupogonius pulcher is a species of beetle of the family Cerambycidae. It is found in Mexico (Nayarit, Morelos).
