= Paraivongius nigritarsis =

Scientific classification
- Kingdom: Animalia
- Phylum: Arthropoda
- Clade: Pancrustacea
- Class: Insecta
- Order: Coleoptera
- Suborder: Polyphaga
- Infraorder: Cucujiformia
- Family: Chrysomelidae
- Genus: Paraivongius
- Species: P. nigritarsis

Binomial name
- Paraivongius nigritarsis (Lefèvre, 1891)

Synonyms
- Rhembastus nigritarsis Lefèvre, 1891

Species of beetle

Paraivongius nigritarsis is a species of leaf beetle of Cameroon and the Democratic Republic of the Congo. It was first described by Édouard Lefèvre in 1891.
