= Sarum pergeminatus =

Scientific classification
- Kingdom: Animalia
- Phylum: Arthropoda
- Clade: Pancrustacea
- Class: Insecta
- Order: Coleoptera
- Suborder: Polyphaga
- Infraorder: Cucujiformia
- Family: Chrysomelidae
- Genus: Sarum
- Species: S. pergeminatus

Binomial name
- Sarum pergeminatus (Burgeon, 1941)

Synonyms
- Rhembastus pergeminatus Burgeon, 1941

Species of beetle

Sarum pergeminatus is a species of leaf beetle. It is distributed in the Democratic Republic of the Congo and South Sudan. It was first described by the Belgian entomologist Louis Burgeon in 1941.
