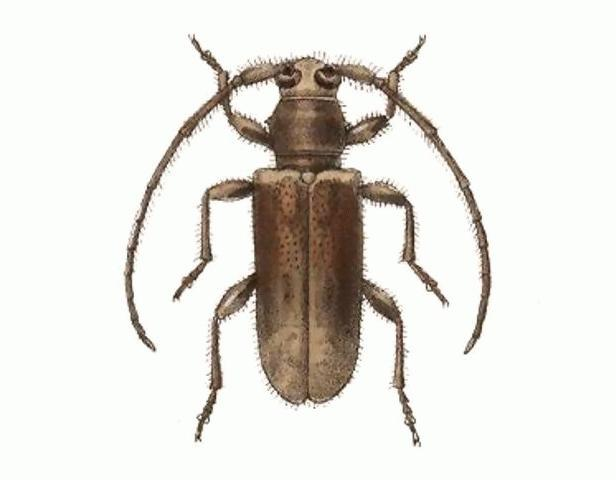

Scientific classification
- Domain: Eukaryota
- Kingdom: Animalia
- Phylum: Arthropoda
- Class: Insecta
- Order: Coleoptera
- Suborder: Polyphaga
- Infraorder: Cucujiformia
- Family: Cerambycidae
- Genus: Eupogonius
- Species: E. infimus

Binomial name
- Eupogonius infimus (Thomson, 1868)

Synonyms
- Eupogonius marmoratus Fisher, 1925; Eupogonius subaeneus Bates, 1872

= Eupogonius infimus =

Species of beetle

Eupogonius infimus is a species of beetle in the family Cerambycidae. It was described by Thomson in 1868. It is known from Panama, Mexico, and Venezuela.
