= Eupogonius albipilis =

Scientific classification
- Kingdom: Animalia
- Phylum: Arthropoda
- Class: Insecta
- Order: Coleoptera
- Suborder: Polyphaga
- Infraorder: Cucujiformia
- Family: Cerambycidae
- Genus: Eupogonius
- Species: E. albipilis

Binomial name
- Eupogonius albipilis Breuning, 1955

Species of beetle

Eupogonius albipilis is a species of beetle in the family Cerambycidae. It was described by Stephan von Breuning in 1955. It is known from Trinidad.
