= Rhembastus mandolloides =

Scientific classification
- Kingdom: Animalia
- Phylum: Arthropoda
- Clade: Pancrustacea
- Class: Insecta
- Order: Coleoptera
- Suborder: Polyphaga
- Infraorder: Cucujiformia
- Family: Chrysomelidae
- Genus: Rhembastus
- Species: R. mandolloides

Binomial name
- Rhembastus mandolloides Selman, 1972

Species of beetle

Rhembastus mandolloides is a species of leaf beetle of the Democratic Republic of the Congo and Ivory Coast, described by Brian J. Selman in 1972.
