= Paraivongius kraatzi =

Scientific classification
- Kingdom: Animalia
- Phylum: Arthropoda
- Clade: Pancrustacea
- Class: Insecta
- Order: Coleoptera
- Suborder: Polyphaga
- Infraorder: Cucujiformia
- Family: Chrysomelidae
- Genus: Paraivongius
- Species: P. kraatzi

Binomial name
- Paraivongius kraatzi (Jacoby, 1898)

Synonyms
- Rhembastus kraatzi Jacoby, 1898

Species of beetle

Paraivongius kraatzi is a species of leaf beetle of Cameroon and the Democratic Republic of the Congo. It was first described by Martin Jacoby in 1898.
