= Eupogonius griseus =

Scientific classification
- Kingdom: Animalia
- Phylum: Arthropoda
- Clade: Pancrustacea
- Class: Insecta
- Order: Coleoptera
- Suborder: Polyphaga
- Infraorder: Cucujiformia
- Family: Cerambycidae
- Genus: Eupogonius
- Species: E. griseus

Binomial name
- Eupogonius griseus Fisher, 1926

Species of beetle

Eupogonius griseus is a species of beetle in the family Cerambycidae. It was described by Fisher in 1926. It is known from Cuba.
