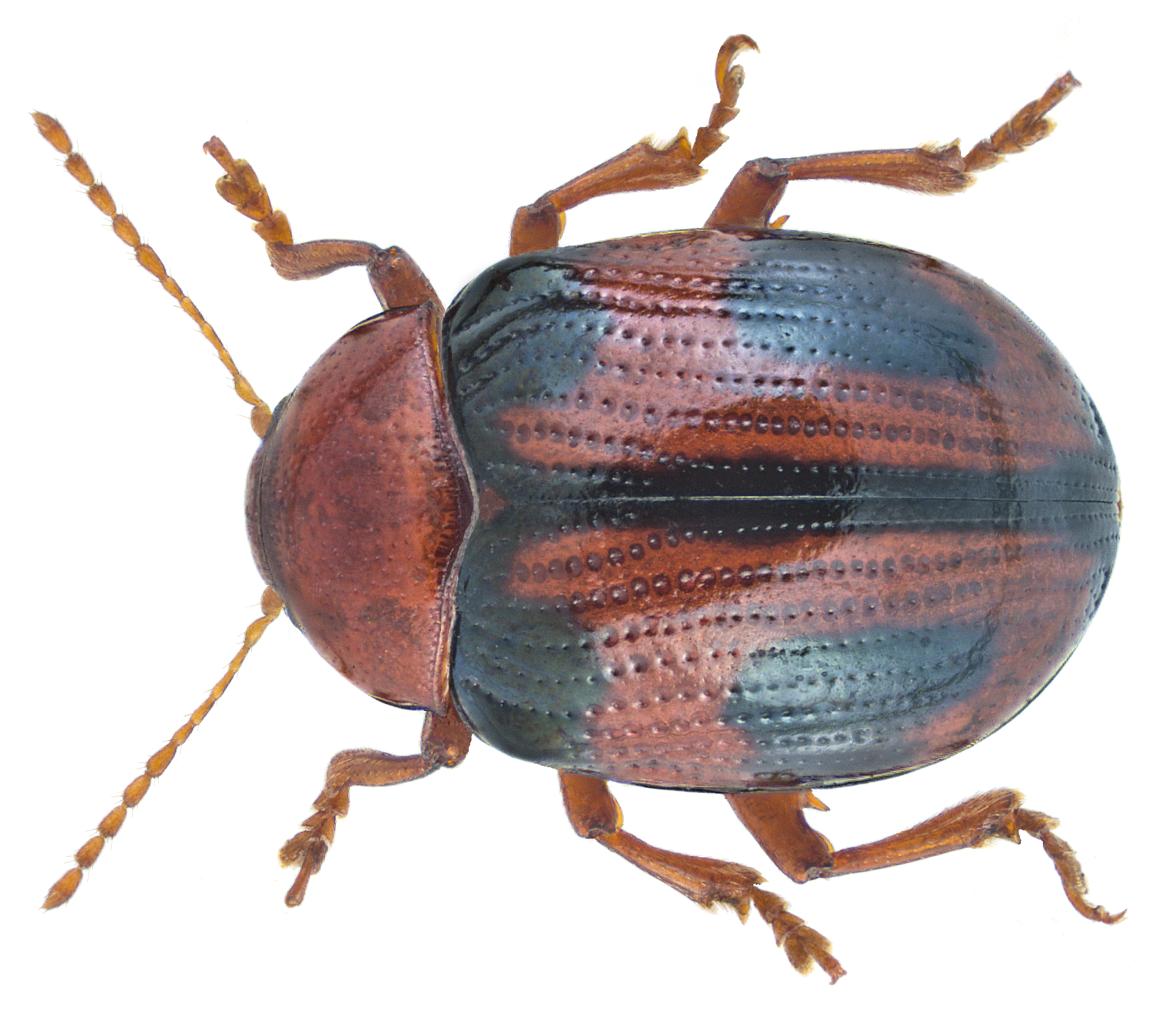
- Rhembastus variabilis

Scientific classification
- Kingdom: Animalia
- Phylum: Arthropoda
- Clade: Pancrustacea
- Class: Insecta
- Order: Coleoptera
- Suborder: Polyphaga
- Infraorder: Cucujiformia
- Family: Chrysomelidae
- Genus: Rhembastus
- Species: R. variabilis

Binomial name
- Rhembastus variabilis Harold, 1877

Synonyms
- Rhambastus variabilis var. madoni Pic, 1952; Rhambastus variabilis var. paulojunctus Pic, 1952; Rhambastus variabilis var. separatus Pic, 1952; Rhambastus variabilis var. viridipennis Pic, 1952; Rhembastus parvidens Harold, 1879; Rhembastus variabilis ab. fasciatus Weise, 1909; Rhembastus variabilis var. a Harold, 1877; Rhembastus variabilis var. b Harold, 1877; Rhembastus variabilis var. c Harold, 1877; Rhembastus variabilis var. d Harold, 1877; Syagrus quadrinotatus Lefèvre, 1877

= Rhembastus variabilis =

Species of beetle

Rhembastus variabilis is a species of leaf beetle. It is distributed in South Africa, Mozambique, the Democratic Republic of the Congo, South Sudan, and West Africa as far as Guinea and Ivory Coast. It was described by the German entomologist Edgar von Harold in 1877.
