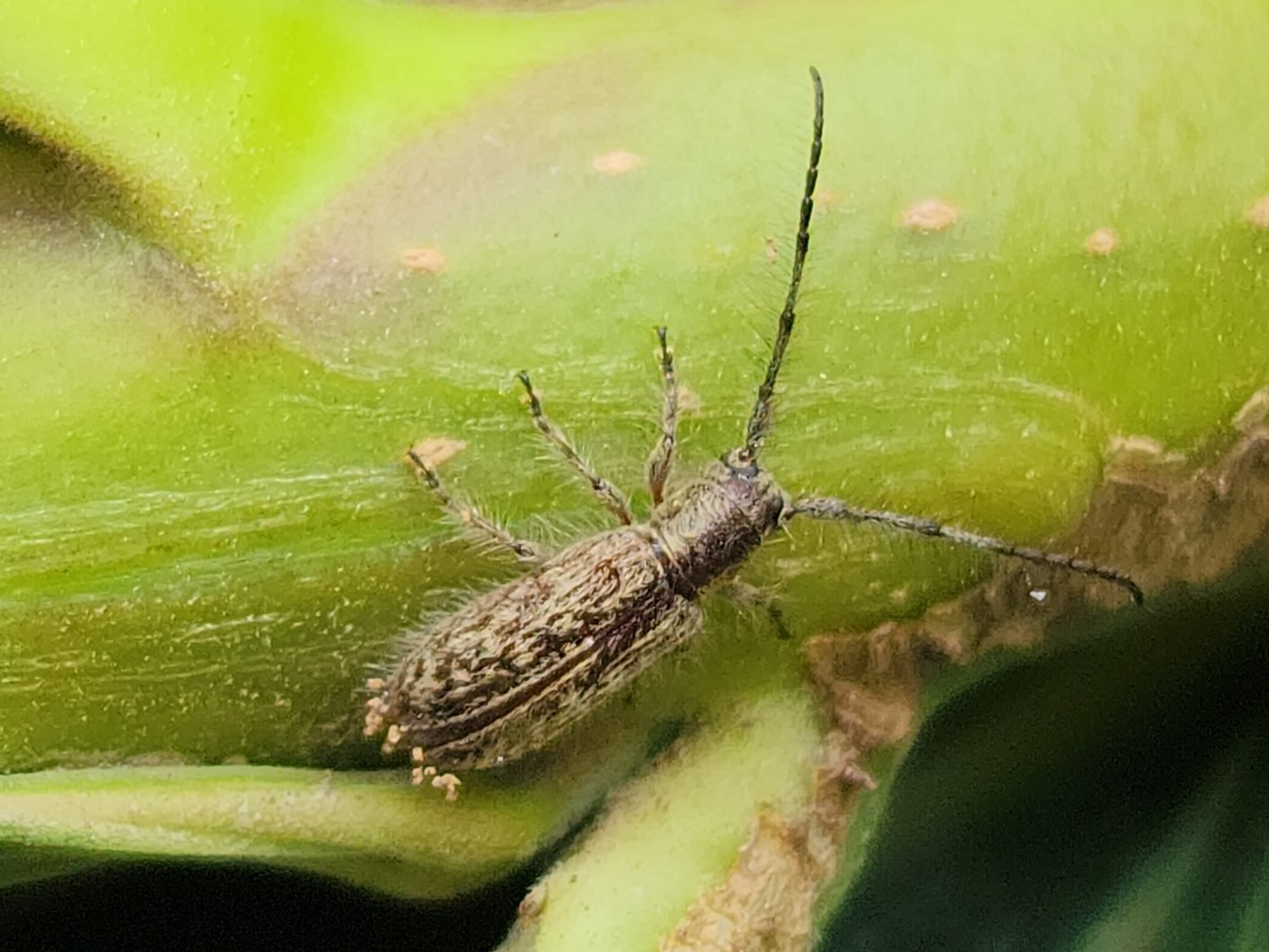

Scientific classification
- Kingdom: Animalia
- Phylum: Arthropoda
- Class: Insecta
- Order: Coleoptera
- Suborder: Polyphaga
- Infraorder: Cucujiformia
- Family: Cerambycidae
- Genus: Eupogonius
- Species: E. lineolatus

Binomial name
- Eupogonius lineolatus Melzer, 1933

= Eupogonius lineolatus =

Species of beetle

Eupogonius lineolatus is a species of beetle in the family Cerambycidae. It was described by Melzer in 1933. It is known from Argentina, Brazil, Paraguay, and Uruguay.
