= Eupogonius azteca =

Scientific classification
- Kingdom: Animalia
- Phylum: Arthropoda
- Clade: Pancrustacea
- Class: Insecta
- Order: Coleoptera
- Suborder: Polyphaga
- Infraorder: Cucujiformia
- Family: Cerambycidae
- Genus: Eupogonius
- Species: E. azteca

Binomial name
- Eupogonius azteca Martins, Santos-Silva & Galileo, 2015

Species of beetle

Eupogonius azteca is a species of beetle of the family Cerambycidae. It is found in Mexico (Chiapas, Guerrero, Veracruz), Guatemala and Honduras.
