= Eupogonius hagmanni =

Scientific classification
- Kingdom: Animalia
- Phylum: Arthropoda
- Class: Insecta
- Order: Coleoptera
- Suborder: Polyphaga
- Infraorder: Cucujiformia
- Family: Cerambycidae
- Genus: Eupogonius
- Species: E. hagmanni

Binomial name
- Eupogonius hagmanni Melzer, 1927

Species of beetle

Eupogonius hagmanni is a species of beetle in the family Cerambycidae. It was described by Melzer in 1927. It is known from Brazil.
