= Paraivongius varicolor =

Scientific classification
- Kingdom: Animalia
- Phylum: Arthropoda
- Clade: Pancrustacea
- Class: Insecta
- Order: Coleoptera
- Suborder: Polyphaga
- Infraorder: Cucujiformia
- Family: Chrysomelidae
- Genus: Paraivongius
- Species: P. varicolor

Binomial name
- Paraivongius varicolor (Lefèvre, 1891)

Synonyms
- Syagrus varicolor Lefèvre, 1891

Species of beetle

Paraivongius varicolor is a species of leaf beetle from Nigeria and the Democratic Republic of the Congo, described by Édouard Lefèvre in 1891.
