= Eupogonius pilosulus =

Scientific classification
- Domain: Eukaryota
- Kingdom: Animalia
- Phylum: Arthropoda
- Class: Insecta
- Order: Coleoptera
- Suborder: Polyphaga
- Infraorder: Cucujiformia
- Family: Cerambycidae
- Genus: Eupogonius
- Species: E. pilosulus

Binomial name
- Eupogonius pilosulus (Chevrolat, 1862)

Species of beetle

Eupogonius pilosulus is a species of beetle in the family Cerambycidae. It was described by Louis Alexandre Auguste Chevrolat in 1862. It is known from Cuba and Jamaica.
