= Eupogonius strandi =

Scientific classification
- Kingdom: Animalia
- Phylum: Arthropoda
- Class: Insecta
- Order: Coleoptera
- Suborder: Polyphaga
- Infraorder: Cucujiformia
- Family: Cerambycidae
- Genus: Eupogonius
- Species: E. strandi

Binomial name
- Eupogonius strandi Breuning, 1942

Species of beetle

Eupogonius strandi is a species of beetle in the family Cerambycidae. It was described by Stephan von Breuning in 1942. It is known from Costa Rica.
