= Eupogonius arizonensis =

Scientific classification
- Domain: Eukaryota
- Kingdom: Animalia
- Phylum: Arthropoda
- Class: Insecta
- Order: Coleoptera
- Suborder: Polyphaga
- Infraorder: Cucujiformia
- Family: Cerambycidae
- Genus: Eupogonius
- Species: E. arizonensis

Binomial name
- Eupogonius arizonensis Knull, 1954

Species of beetle

Eupogonius arizonensis is a species of beetle in the family Cerambycidae. It was described by Knull in 1954. It is known from the United States.
