= Pseudanaesthetis =

Scientific classification
- Kingdom: Animalia
- Phylum: Arthropoda
- Class: Insecta
- Order: Coleoptera
- Suborder: Polyphaga
- Infraorder: Cucujiformia
- Family: Cerambycidae
- Tribe: Desmiphorini
- Genus: Pseudanaesthetis

Genus of beetles

Pseudanaesthetis is a genus of longhorn beetles of the subfamily Lamiinae, containing the following species:

- Pseudanaesthetis atripes Pic, 1926
- Pseudanaesthetis densepunctata Breuning, 1954
- Pseudanaesthetis formosana Breuning, 1975
- Pseudanaesthetis langana Pic, 1922
- Pseudanaesthetis nigripennis Breuning, 1940
- Pseudanaesthetis rufa Gressitt, 1942
- Pseudanaesthetis rufipennis (Matsushita, 1933)
- Pseudanaesthetis sumatrana Pic, 1942
