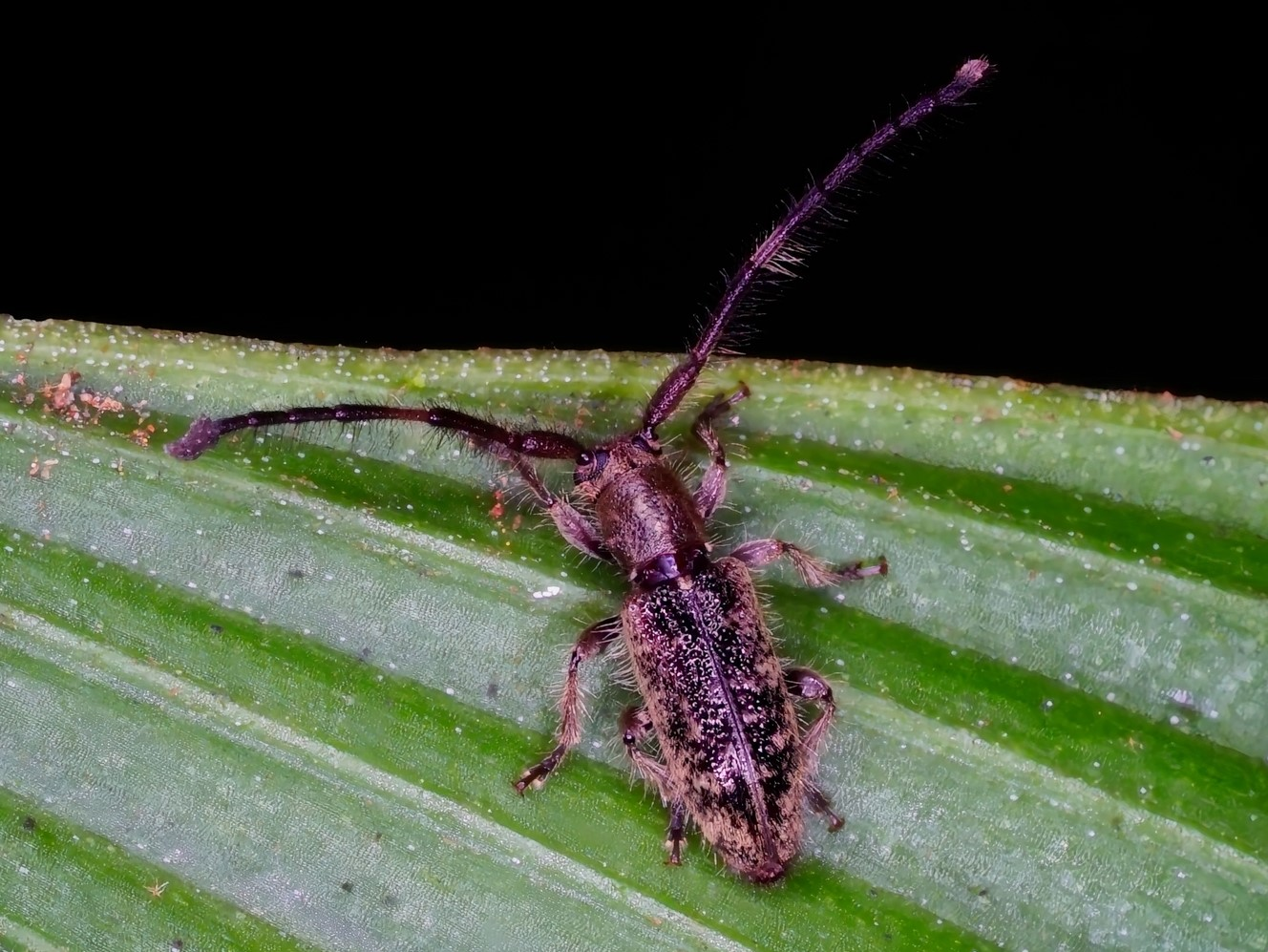

Scientific classification
- Kingdom: Animalia
- Phylum: Arthropoda
- Class: Insecta
- Order: Coleoptera
- Suborder: Polyphaga
- Infraorder: Cucujiformia
- Family: Cerambycidae
- Genus: Eupogonius
- Species: E. pubicollis

Binomial name
- Eupogonius pubicollis Melzer, 1933

= Eupogonius pubicollis =

Species of beetle

Eupogonius pubicollis is a species of beetle in the family Cerambycidae. It was first described by Melzer in 1933. It is known from Honduras and Panama.
