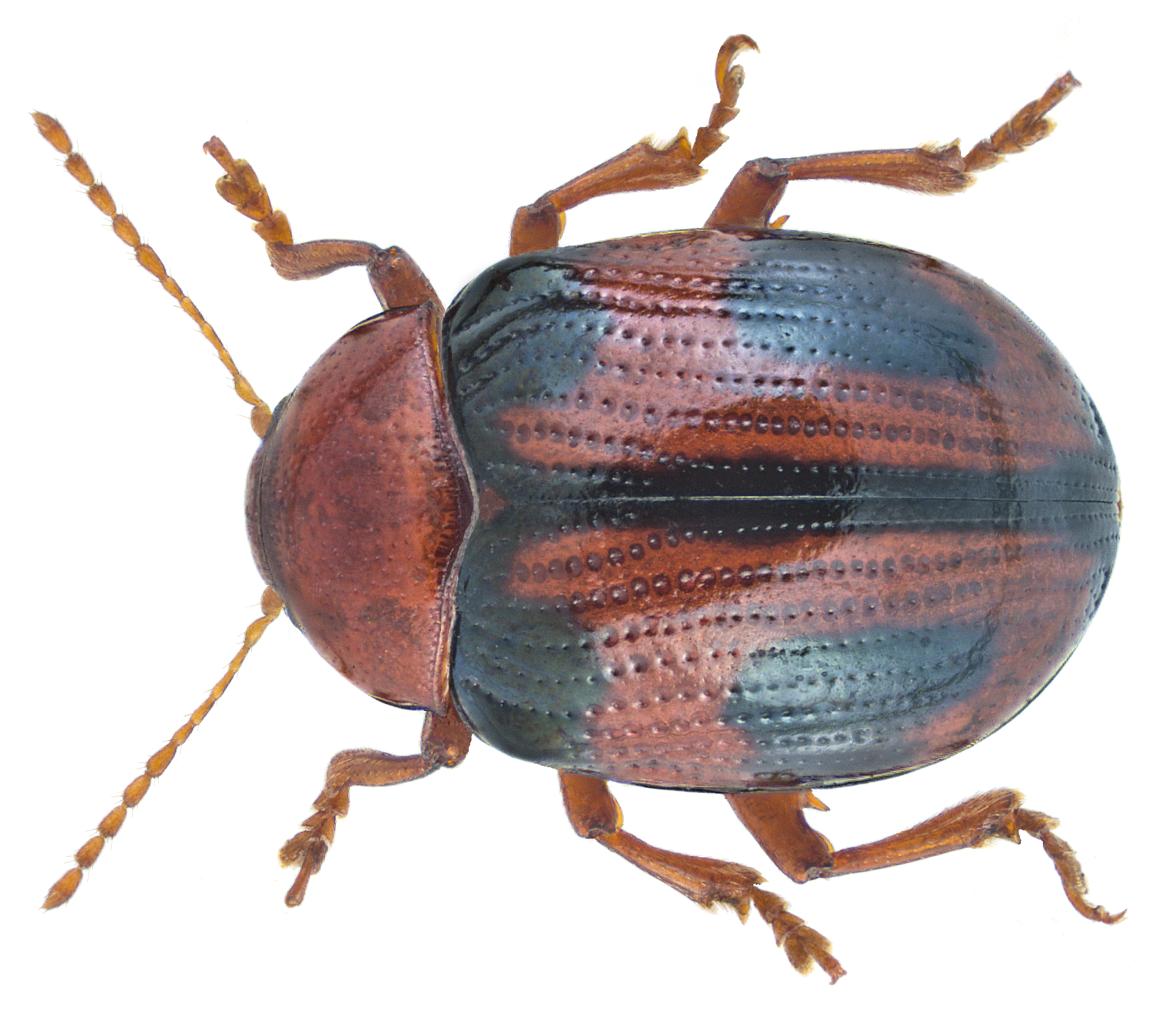
- Rhembastus variabilis

Scientific classification
- Kingdom: Animalia
- Phylum: Arthropoda
- Clade: Pancrustacea
- Class: Insecta
- Order: Coleoptera
- Suborder: Polyphaga
- Infraorder: Cucujiformia
- Family: Chrysomelidae
- Subfamily: Eumolpinae
- Tribe: Typophorini
- Genus: Rhembastus; Harold, 1877

Type species
- Rhembastus variabilis Harold, 1877

Synonyms
- Rhambastus Pic, 1939

= Rhembastus =

Genus of leaf beetles

Rhembastus is a genus of leaf beetles in the subfamily Eumolpinae, native to Africa. Whilst the taxonomy of the genus is disputed, the genus has been suggested as a biological control agent for Bryophyllum delagoense in Australia.

== Taxonomy ==
The genus was first identified by the German entomologist Edgar von Harold in 1877 from species in Madagascar, Nyassa and Port Natal. By 1914, 18 different species had already been recorded from Madagascar. In 1965, Brian J. Selman reduced the size of the genus by 45 species, transferring them to other genera such as Paraivongius, Massartia and Sarum. He also suggested that a revision of the Eumolpinae of Madagascar would produce a complete generic separation of the Madagascan and African species. In 2006, it was suggested that a full revision of the genus is necessary.

== Species ==
Species from Africa:

- Rhembastus apicalis Pic, 1940
- Rhembastus apicicollis Burgeon, 1941
- Rhembastus atripennis Pic, 1939
- Rhembastus atriventris Pic, 1939
- Rhembastus benuensis Weise, 1907
- Rhembastus bipunctatus Selman, 1972
- Rhembastus brevicornis (Jacoby, 1904)
- Rhembastus collaris (Gerstaecker, 1871)
- Rhembastus crampeli Pic, 1952
- Rhembastus crassus Burgeon, 1941
- Rhembastus discoidalis Pic, 1939
- Rhembastus diversicolor Pic, 1939
- Rhembastus flavidus Lefèvre, 1890
- Rhembastus impressicostatus Pic, 1940
- Rhembastus laticollis Burgeon, 1942
- Rhembastus maculatus (Lefèvre, 1877)
- Rhembastus mandolloides Selman, 1972
- Rhembastus mechowi (Weise, 1883)
- Rhembastus melanostictus Fairmaire, 1886
- Rhembastus metalliconotatus Pic, 1939
- Rhembastus natalensis (Lefèvre, 1877)
- Rhembastus niger Burgeon, 1941
- Rhembastus perarmatus Burgeon, 1941
- Rhembastus piceus Zoia, 2017
- Rhembastus punctatosulcatus Fairmaire, 1887
- Rhembastus remaudierei Jolivet, 1953
- Rhembastus ruficolor Pic, 1941
- Rhembastus rufiventris Pic, 1953
- Rhembastus rufocinctus Pic, 1939
- Rhembastus rufofasciatus Pic, 1952
- Rhembastus rufohumeralis Pic, 1939
- Rhembastus semiviolaceus Pic, 1952
- Rhembastus simoni (Weise, 1883)
- Rhembastus striatipennis Lefèvre, 1891
- Rhembastus testaceoapicalis Pic, 1939
- Rhembastus usambaricus Weise, 1907
- Rhembastus variabilis Harold, 1877
- Rhembastus xanthocnemis Weise, 1907

Species from Madagascar:

- Rhembastus abbreviatus (Jacoby, 1897)
- Rhembastus ambohibyensis Bechyné, 1960
- Rhembastus ampanefenae Bechyné, 1953
- Rhembastus androyensis Bechyné, 1956
- Rhembastus antennatus Jacoby, 1892
- Rhembastus antsirabensis Bechyné, 1954
- Rhembastus apicicornis Jacoby, 1897
- Rhembastus asuefactus Bechyné, 1950
- Rhembastus atomarius (Lefèvre, 1877)
- Rhembastus attelaboides (Fairmaire, 1886)
- Rhembastus augur Bechyné, 1947
- Rhembastus caeruleipennis Jacoby, 1901
- Rhembastus centralis Bechyné, 1956
- Rhembastus chatanayi Bechyné, 1960
- Rhembastus circumductus Bechyné, 1953
- Rhembastus colasi Bechyné, 1956
- Rhembastus congener Bechyné, 1946
- Rhembastus coquillati Bechyné, 1947
- Rhembastus costulifer Bechyné, 1947
- Rhembastus dimidiaticornis Jacoby, 1892
- Rhembastus dissutus Bechyné, 1951
- Rhembastus felicitarius Bechyné, 1956
- Rhembastus flavotibialis Bechyné, 1946
- Rhembastus fulvipennis (Duvivier, 1891)
- Rhembastus geniculatus Harold, 1877
- Rhembastus gibbifer Bechyné, 1956
- Rhembastus gracilipes Bechyné, 1960
- Rhembastus hereditarius Bechyné, 1947
- Rhembastus hoberlandti Bechyné, 1946
- Rhembastus hovus Bechyné, 1946
- Rhembastus humerosus Weise, 1910
- Rhembastus imitans Jacoby, 1897
- Rhembastus jacobyi Weise, 1910
- Rhembastus janthinipennis (Fairmaire, 1869)
- Rhembastus jeanneli Bechyné, 1946
- Rhembastus joliveti Bechyné, 1946
- Rhembastus lambertoni Bechyné, 1946
- Rhembastus lebisi Bechyné, 1946
- Rhembastus lepidus Weise, 1910
- Rhembastus madagascariensis (Lefèvre, 1877)
- Rhembastus mandritsarensis Bechyné, 1951
  - Rhembastus mandritsarensis contrarius Bechyné, 1951
  - Rhembastus mandritsarensis mandritsarensis Bechyné, 1951
- Rhembastus manjakatompensis Bechyné, 1964
- Rhembastus micheli Bechyné, 1947
- Rhembastus multatitius Bechyné, 1964
- Rhembastus nanulus Harold, 1877
  - Rhembastus nanulus comorensis Bechyné, 1964 – Comoro Islands
  - Rhembastus nanulus fallaciosissimus Bechyné, 1949
  - Rhembastus nanulus insularis (Maulik, 1931) – Aldabra
  - Rhembastus nanulus nanulus Harold, 1877
  - Rhembastus nanulus nossibeanus Bechyné, 1964
- Rhembastus nickerli Bechyné, 1946
- Rhembastus nigromaculatus (Jacoby, 1892)
- Rhembastus nubilus Harold, 1877
- Rhembastus octomaculatus (Weise, 1910)
- Rhembastus pan Bechyné, 1947
- Rhembastus parioides Bechyné, 1947
- Rhembastus pauliani Bechyné, 1960
- Rhembastus pectoralis Bechyné, 1946
- Rhembastus pensistus Bechyné, 1947
- Rhembastus perinetensis Bechyné, 1960
- Rhembastus persimilis Bechyné, 1946
- Rhembastus persimplex Weise, 1910
- Rhembastus pusillus Harold, 1877
- Rhembastus quadriplagiatus Bechyné, 1947
- Rhembastus sambiranensis Bechyné, 1964
- Rhembastus schaeferi Bechyné, 1947
- Rhembastus seguyi Bechyné, 1960
- Rhembastus selectus Bechyné, 1946
- Rhembastus solicitarius Bechyné, 1964
- Rhembastus stilpnus Bechyné, 1947
- Rhembastus subangulatus Bechyné, 1947
- Rhembastus tananarivensis Bechyné, 1946
- Rhembastus tantillus (Lefèvre, 1877)
- Rhembastus tener Bechyné, 1960
- Rhembastus tibialis (Lefèvre, 1877)
- Rhembastus tonsilis Bechyné, 1951
- Rhembastus tricolor Bechyné, 1946
- Rhembastus unicostulatus Bechyné, 1947

Species moved to Paraivongius:

- Rhembastus inapicalis Pic, 1940
