= Eupogonius albofasciatus =

Scientific classification
- Domain: Eukaryota
- Kingdom: Animalia
- Phylum: Arthropoda
- Class: Insecta
- Order: Coleoptera
- Suborder: Polyphaga
- Infraorder: Cucujiformia
- Family: Cerambycidae
- Genus: Eupogonius
- Species: E. albofasciatus

Binomial name
- Eupogonius albofasciatus Wappes & Santos-Silva, 2020

Species of beetle

Eupogonius albofasciatus is a species of beetle in the family Cerambycidae. It was described by Wappes & Santos-Silva in 2020.
