= Paraivongius bayeri =

Scientific classification
- Kingdom: Animalia
- Phylum: Arthropoda
- Clade: Pancrustacea
- Class: Insecta
- Order: Coleoptera
- Suborder: Polyphaga
- Infraorder: Cucujiformia
- Family: Chrysomelidae
- Genus: Paraivongius
- Species: P. bayeri

Binomial name
- Paraivongius bayeri (Burgeon, 1942)

Synonyms
- Rhembastus bayeri Burgeon, 1942

Species of beetle

Paraivongius bayeri is a species of leaf beetle of the Democratic Republic of the Congo. It was first described by the Belgian entomologist Louis Burgeon in 1942, from specimens collected by Gaston-François de Witte from the Albert National Park between 1933 and 1935.
