= Sarum (beetle) =

Scientific classification
- Kingdom: Animalia
- Phylum: Arthropoda
- Clade: Pancrustacea
- Class: Insecta
- Order: Coleoptera
- Suborder: Polyphaga
- Infraorder: Cucujiformia
- Family: Chrysomelidae
- Subfamily: Eumolpinae
- Tribe: Typophorini
- Genus: Sarum; Selman, 1965

Type species
- Rhembastus geminatus Jacoby, 1900

Genus of leaf beetles from Africa

Sarum is a genus of leaf beetles in the subfamily Eumolpinae, found in Africa. Most of its species were originally placed in Rhembastus.

== Species ==
- Sarum baerti Selman, 1972 – DR Congo
- Sarum geminatus (Jacoby, 1900) – Zimbabwe
- Sarum inermis (Jacoby, 1901) – DR Congo
- Sarum mashonanus (Jacoby, 1901) – Zimbabwe, South Africa
- Sarum monardi (Pic, 1940) – Angola
- Sarum obscurellus (Gerstaecker, 1871) – Tanzania, Kenya
- Sarum pergeminatus (Burgeon, 1941) – DR Congo, Sudan
