= Selmania minima =

Scientific classification
- Kingdom: Animalia
- Phylum: Arthropoda
- Clade: Pancrustacea
- Class: Insecta
- Order: Coleoptera
- Suborder: Polyphaga
- Infraorder: Cucujiformia
- Family: Chrysomelidae
- Genus: Selmania
- Species: S. minima

Binomial name
- Selmania minima (Burgeon, 1942)

Synonyms
- Massartia minima (Burgeon, 1942); Rhembastus minimus Burgeon, 1942

Species of beetle

Selmania minima is a species of leaf beetle. It is distributed in the Democratic Republic of the Congo and South Sudan. It was first described by the Belgian entomologist Louis Burgeon in 1942, from specimens collected by Gaston-François de Witte from the Albert National Park between 1933 and 1935. Host plants for the species include Combretum binderianum.
