= Eupogonius fuscovitatus =

Scientific classification
- Kingdom: Animalia
- Phylum: Arthropoda
- Class: Insecta
- Order: Coleoptera
- Suborder: Polyphaga
- Infraorder: Cucujiformia
- Family: Cerambycidae
- Genus: Eupogonius
- Species: E. fuscovitatus

Binomial name
- Eupogonius fuscovitatus Breuning, 1974

Synonyms
- Eupogonius fuscovittatus Breuning, 1974

Species of beetle

Eupogonius fuscovitatus is a species of beetle in the family Cerambycidae. It was described by Stephan von Breuning in 1974. It is known from Guatemala.
