= Paraivongius flavimanus =

Scientific classification
- Kingdom: Animalia
- Phylum: Arthropoda
- Clade: Pancrustacea
- Class: Insecta
- Order: Coleoptera
- Suborder: Polyphaga
- Infraorder: Cucujiformia
- Family: Chrysomelidae
- Genus: Paraivongius
- Species: P. flavimanus

Binomial name
- Paraivongius flavimanus (Jacoby, 1903)

Synonyms
- Menius flavimanus Jacoby, 1903

Species of beetle

Paraivongius flavimanus is a species of leaf beetle of Cameroon and the Democratic Republic of the Congo, described by Martin Jacoby in 1903.

== Subspecies ==
There are two subspecies of P. flavimanus:

- Paraivongius flavimanus flavimanus (Jacoby, 1903): The nominotypical subspecies. Found in Cameroon.
- Paraivongius flavimanus scheitzae (Burgeon, 1941): Found in the Democratic Republic of the Congo.
