= Eupogonius bierigi =

Scientific classification
- Kingdom: Animalia
- Phylum: Arthropoda
- Clade: Pancrustacea
- Class: Insecta
- Order: Coleoptera
- Suborder: Polyphaga
- Infraorder: Cucujiformia
- Family: Cerambycidae
- Genus: Eupogonius
- Species: E. bierigi

Binomial name
- Eupogonius bierigi Melzer, 1933

Species of beetle

Eupogonius bierigi is a species of beetle in the family Cerambycidae. It was described by Melzer in 1933. It is known from Cuba.
