= Paraivongius ruandicus =

Scientific classification
- Kingdom: Animalia
- Phylum: Arthropoda
- Clade: Pancrustacea
- Class: Insecta
- Order: Coleoptera
- Suborder: Polyphaga
- Infraorder: Cucujiformia
- Family: Chrysomelidae
- Genus: Paraivongius
- Species: P. ruandicus

Binomial name
- Paraivongius ruandicus (Weise, 1912)

Synonyms
- Liniscus ruandicus Weise, 1912

Species of beetle

Paraivongius ruandicus is a species of leaf beetle. It is distributed in Rwanda, the Democratic Republic of the Congo and Ethiopia. It was described by Julius Weise in 1912.
