= Eupogonius pubescens =

Scientific classification
- Domain: Eukaryota
- Kingdom: Animalia
- Phylum: Arthropoda
- Class: Insecta
- Order: Coleoptera
- Suborder: Polyphaga
- Infraorder: Cucujiformia
- Family: Cerambycidae
- Genus: Eupogonius
- Species: E. pubescens

Binomial name
- Eupogonius pubescens LeConte, 1873

Species of beetle

Eupogonius pubescens is a species of beetle in the family Cerambycidae. It was described by John Lawrence LeConte in 1873. It is known from the United States.
