= Eupogonius lanuginosus =

Scientific classification
- Kingdom: Animalia
- Phylum: Arthropoda
- Clade: Pancrustacea
- Class: Insecta
- Order: Coleoptera
- Suborder: Polyphaga
- Infraorder: Cucujiformia
- Family: Cerambycidae
- Genus: Eupogonius
- Species: E. lanuginosus

Binomial name
- Eupogonius lanuginosus (Chevrolat, 1862)

Species of beetle

Eupogonius lanuginosus is a species of beetle in the family Cerambycidae. It was described by Chevrolat in 1862. It is known from Cuba.
