= Eupogonius petulans =

Scientific classification
- Kingdom: Animalia
- Phylum: Arthropoda
- Class: Insecta
- Order: Coleoptera
- Suborder: Polyphaga
- Infraorder: Cucujiformia
- Family: Cerambycidae
- Genus: Eupogonius
- Species: E. petulans

Binomial name
- Eupogonius petulans Melzer, 1933

Species of beetle

Eupogonius petulans is a species of beetle in the family Cerambycidae. It was described by Melzer in 1933. It is known from Argentina, Brazil, and Uruguay.
