= Eupogonius major =

Scientific classification
- Domain: Eukaryota
- Kingdom: Animalia
- Phylum: Arthropoda
- Class: Insecta
- Order: Coleoptera
- Suborder: Polyphaga
- Infraorder: Cucujiformia
- Family: Cerambycidae
- Genus: Eupogonius
- Species: E. major

Binomial name
- Eupogonius major Bates, 1885

Species of beetle

Eupogonius major is a species of beetle in the family Cerambycidae. It was described by Henry Walter Bates in 1885. It is known from Costa Rica, Guatemala, Mexico, and Honduras.
