= Eupogonius lateralis =

Scientific classification
- Domain: Eukaryota
- Kingdom: Animalia
- Phylum: Arthropoda
- Class: Insecta
- Order: Coleoptera
- Suborder: Polyphaga
- Infraorder: Cucujiformia
- Family: Cerambycidae
- Genus: Eupogonius
- Species: E. lateralis

Binomial name
- Eupogonius lateralis Martins & Galileo, 2009

Species of beetle

Eupogonius lateralis is a species of beetle in the family Cerambycidae. It was described by Martins and Galileo in 2009. It is known from Costa Rica.
