= Eupogonius fulvovestitus =

Scientific classification
- Domain: Eukaryota
- Kingdom: Animalia
- Phylum: Arthropoda
- Class: Insecta
- Order: Coleoptera
- Suborder: Polyphaga
- Infraorder: Cucujiformia
- Family: Cerambycidae
- Genus: Eupogonius
- Species: E. fulvovestitus

Binomial name
- Eupogonius fulvovestitus Schaeffer, 1905

Species of beetle

Eupogonius fulvovestitus is a species of beetle in the family Cerambycidae. It was described by Schaeffer in 1905. It is known from the United States.
