= Eupogonius monnei =

Scientific classification
- Kingdom: Animalia
- Phylum: Arthropoda
- Clade: Pancrustacea
- Class: Insecta
- Order: Coleoptera
- Suborder: Polyphaga
- Infraorder: Cucujiformia
- Family: Cerambycidae
- Genus: Eupogonius
- Species: E. monnei

Binomial name
- Eupogonius monnei Pérez-Flores, 2026

Species of beetle

Eupogonius monnei is a species of beetle of the family Cerambycidae. It is found in Mexico (Jalisco, Nayarit, Michoacán).

== Description ==
Adults reach a length of about 6.1–6.4 mm (0.24–0.25 in). The integument is mostly dark brown, but clearer in some areas. The ventral mouthparts are reddish brown (but darker on some areas), except for the palpi, which are yellowish-brown with a yellowish apex. The basal two-thirds of the anteclypeus is yellowish and the basal third of the labrum is yellowish brown. The apex of the scape is reddish brown, and the basal three-fourths of antennomere III, as well as the basal two-thirds and anterior third of antennomeres V-X are dark reddish brown. The elytra have reddish brown disperse areas.

== Etymology ==
The species is dedicated to Dr. Miguel A. Monné.
