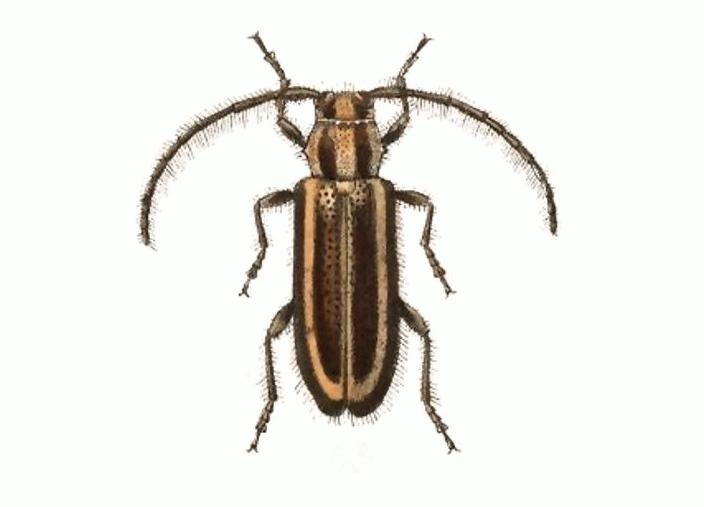

Scientific classification
- Domain: Eukaryota
- Kingdom: Animalia
- Phylum: Arthropoda
- Class: Insecta
- Order: Coleoptera
- Suborder: Polyphaga
- Infraorder: Cucujiformia
- Family: Cerambycidae
- Genus: Eupogonius
- Species: E. flavocinctus

Binomial name
- Eupogonius flavocinctus Bates, 1872

= Eupogonius flavocinctus =

Species of beetle

Eupogonius flavocinctus is a species of beetle in the family Cerambycidae. It was described by Henry Walter Bates in 1872. It is known from Costa Rica and Honduras.
