= Paraivongius pidigalaensis =

Scientific classification
- Kingdom: Animalia
- Phylum: Arthropoda
- Clade: Pancrustacea
- Class: Insecta
- Order: Coleoptera
- Suborder: Polyphaga
- Infraorder: Cucujiformia
- Family: Chrysomelidae
- Genus: Paraivongius
- Species: P. pidigalaensis

Binomial name
- Paraivongius pidigalaensis Selman, 1972

Species of beetle

Paraivongius pidigalaensis is a species of leaf beetle reported from the Republic of the Congo, the Democratic Republic of the Congo and Ivory Coast. It was first described from Garamba National Park by Brian J. Selman in 1972. Its host plants include Erythrophleum guineense and Theobroma cacao.
