= Eupogonius maculicornis =

Scientific classification
- Kingdom: Animalia
- Phylum: Arthropoda
- Clade: Pancrustacea
- Class: Insecta
- Order: Coleoptera
- Suborder: Polyphaga
- Infraorder: Cucujiformia
- Family: Cerambycidae
- Genus: Eupogonius
- Species: E. maculicornis

Binomial name
- Eupogonius maculicornis (Chevrolat, 1862)

Species of beetle

Eupogonius maculicornis is a species of beetle in the family Cerambycidae. It was described by Chevrolat in 1862. It is known from Cuba.
