= Eupogonius cryptus =

Scientific classification
- Domain: Eukaryota
- Kingdom: Animalia
- Phylum: Arthropoda
- Class: Insecta
- Order: Coleoptera
- Suborder: Polyphaga
- Infraorder: Cucujiformia
- Family: Cerambycidae
- Genus: Eupogonius
- Species: E. cryptus

Binomial name
- Eupogonius cryptus Hovore, 1989

Species of beetle

Eupogonius cryptus is a species of beetle in the family Cerambycidae. It was described by Hovore in 1989. It is known from Costa Rica.
