= Pseudanaesthetis rufa =

Scientific classification
- Kingdom: Animalia
- Phylum: Arthropoda
- Class: Insecta
- Order: Coleoptera
- Suborder: Polyphaga
- Infraorder: Cucujiformia
- Family: Cerambycidae
- Genus: Pseudanaesthetis
- Species: P. rufa

Binomial name
- Pseudanaesthetis rufa Gressitt, 1942

Species of beetle

Pseudanaesthetis rufa is a species of beetle in the family Cerambycidae. It was described by Gressitt in 1942.
