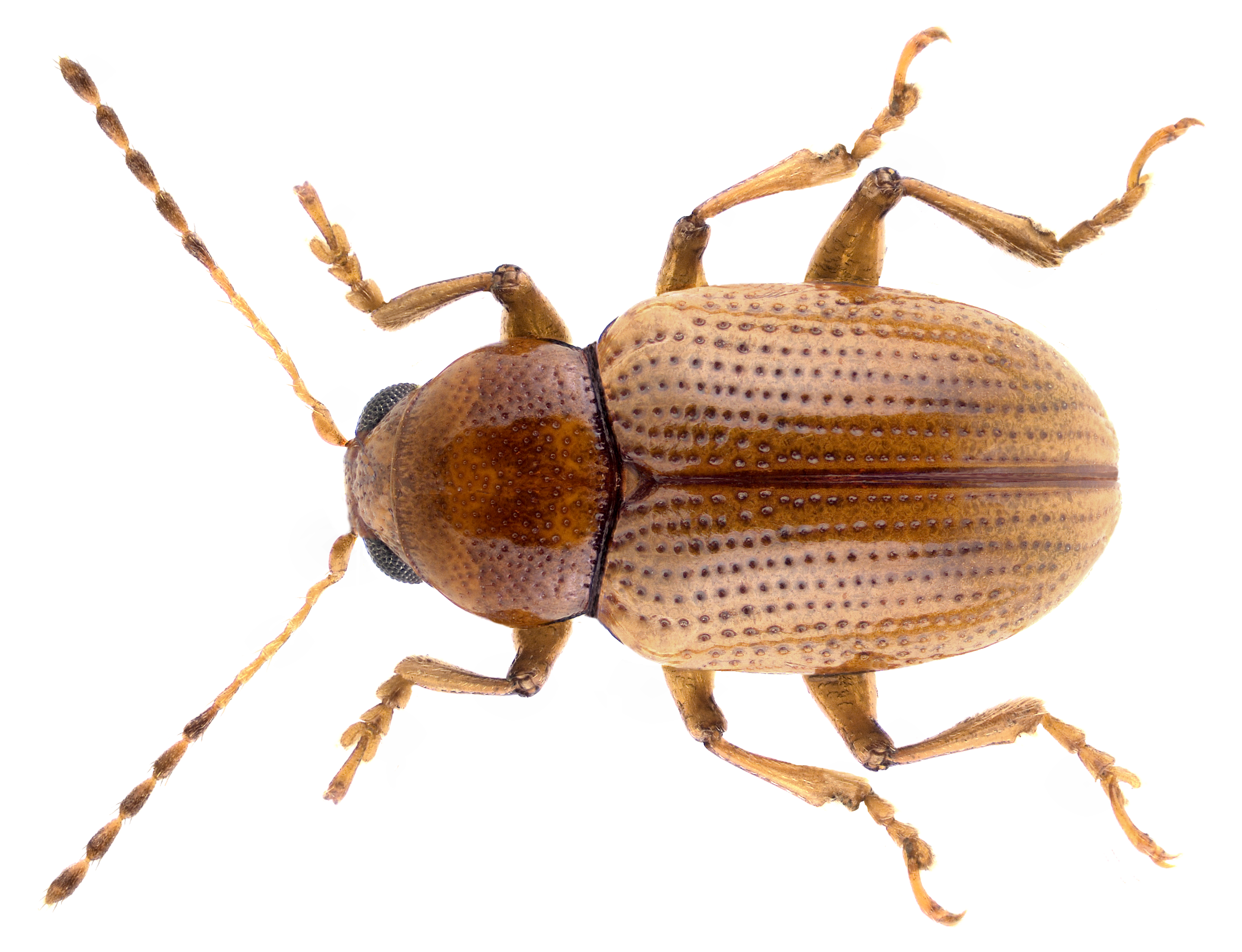
- Rhembastus remaudierei

Scientific classification
- Kingdom: Animalia
- Phylum: Arthropoda
- Clade: Pancrustacea
- Class: Insecta
- Order: Coleoptera
- Suborder: Polyphaga
- Infraorder: Cucujiformia
- Family: Chrysomelidae
- Genus: Rhembastus
- Species: R. remaudierei

Binomial name
- Rhembastus remaudierei Jolivet, 1953

= Rhembastus remaudierei =

Species of beetle

Rhembastus remaudierei is a species of leaf beetle of Mali. It was described by the French entomologist Pierre Hippolyte Auguste Jolivet in 1953.
