= Paraivongius costatus =

Scientific classification
- Kingdom: Animalia
- Phylum: Arthropoda
- Clade: Pancrustacea
- Class: Insecta
- Order: Coleoptera
- Suborder: Polyphaga
- Infraorder: Cucujiformia
- Family: Chrysomelidae
- Genus: Paraivongius
- Species: P. costatus

Binomial name
- Paraivongius costatus (Jacoby, 1894)

Synonyms
- Rhembastus costatus Jacoby, 1894

Species of beetle

Paraivongius costatus is a species of leaf beetle of the Democratic Republic of the Congo and West Africa. It was first described by Martin Jacoby in 1894.
