= Eupogonius boteroi =

Scientific classification
- Kingdom: Animalia
- Phylum: Arthropoda
- Clade: Pancrustacea
- Class: Insecta
- Order: Coleoptera
- Suborder: Polyphaga
- Infraorder: Cucujiformia
- Family: Cerambycidae
- Genus: Eupogonius
- Species: E. boteroi

Binomial name
- Eupogonius boteroi Wappes & Santos-Silva, 2020

Species of beetle

Eupogonius boteroi is a species of beetle of the family Cerambycidae. It is found in Mexico (Chiapas, Colima, Guerrero, Jalisco, Michoacán de Ocampo, Oaxaca).
