= Pseudanaesthetis atripes =

Scientific classification
- Kingdom: Animalia
- Phylum: Arthropoda
- Class: Insecta
- Order: Coleoptera
- Suborder: Polyphaga
- Infraorder: Cucujiformia
- Family: Cerambycidae
- Genus: Pseudanaesthetis
- Species: P. atripes

Binomial name
- Pseudanaesthetis atripes Pic, 1926

Species of beetle

Pseudanaesthetis atripes is a species of beetle in the family Cerambycidae. It was described by Pic in 1926.
