= Rhembastus mechowi =

Scientific classification
- Kingdom: Animalia
- Phylum: Arthropoda
- Clade: Pancrustacea
- Class: Insecta
- Order: Coleoptera
- Suborder: Polyphaga
- Infraorder: Cucujiformia
- Family: Chrysomelidae
- Genus: Rhembastus
- Species: R. mechowi

Binomial name
- Rhembastus mechowi (Weise, 1883)

Synonyms
- Syagrus mechowi Weise, 1883

Species of beetle

Rhembastus mechowi is a species of leaf beetle of the Democratic Republic of the Congo, described by Julius Weise in 1883.
