= Eupogonius stellatus =

Scientific classification
- Kingdom: Animalia
- Phylum: Arthropoda
- Clade: Pancrustacea
- Class: Insecta
- Order: Coleoptera
- Suborder: Polyphaga
- Infraorder: Cucujiformia
- Family: Cerambycidae
- Genus: Eupogonius
- Species: E. stellatus

Binomial name
- Eupogonius stellatus Chemsak & Noguera, 1993

Species of beetle

Eupogonius stellatus is a species of beetle in the family Cerambycidae. It was described by Chemsak and Noguera in 1993. It is known from Mexico (Guerrero, Jalisco, Morelos).
