= Paraivongius diversitarsis =

Scientific classification
- Kingdom: Animalia
- Phylum: Arthropoda
- Clade: Pancrustacea
- Class: Insecta
- Order: Coleoptera
- Suborder: Polyphaga
- Infraorder: Cucujiformia
- Family: Chrysomelidae
- Genus: Paraivongius
- Species: P. diversitarsis

Binomial name
- Paraivongius diversitarsis (Pic, 1952)

Species of beetle

Paraivongius diversitarsis is a species of leaf beetle of Senegal, described by Maurice Pic in 1952.
