= Eupogonius wickhami =

Scientific classification
- Domain: Eukaryota
- Kingdom: Animalia
- Phylum: Arthropoda
- Class: Insecta
- Order: Coleoptera
- Suborder: Polyphaga
- Infraorder: Cucujiformia
- Family: Cerambycidae
- Genus: Eupogonius
- Species: E. wickhami

Binomial name
- Eupogonius wickhami Fisher, 1935

Species of beetle

Eupogonius wickhami is a species of beetle in the family Cerambycidae. It was described by Fisher in 1935. It is known from the Bahamas and Jamaica.
