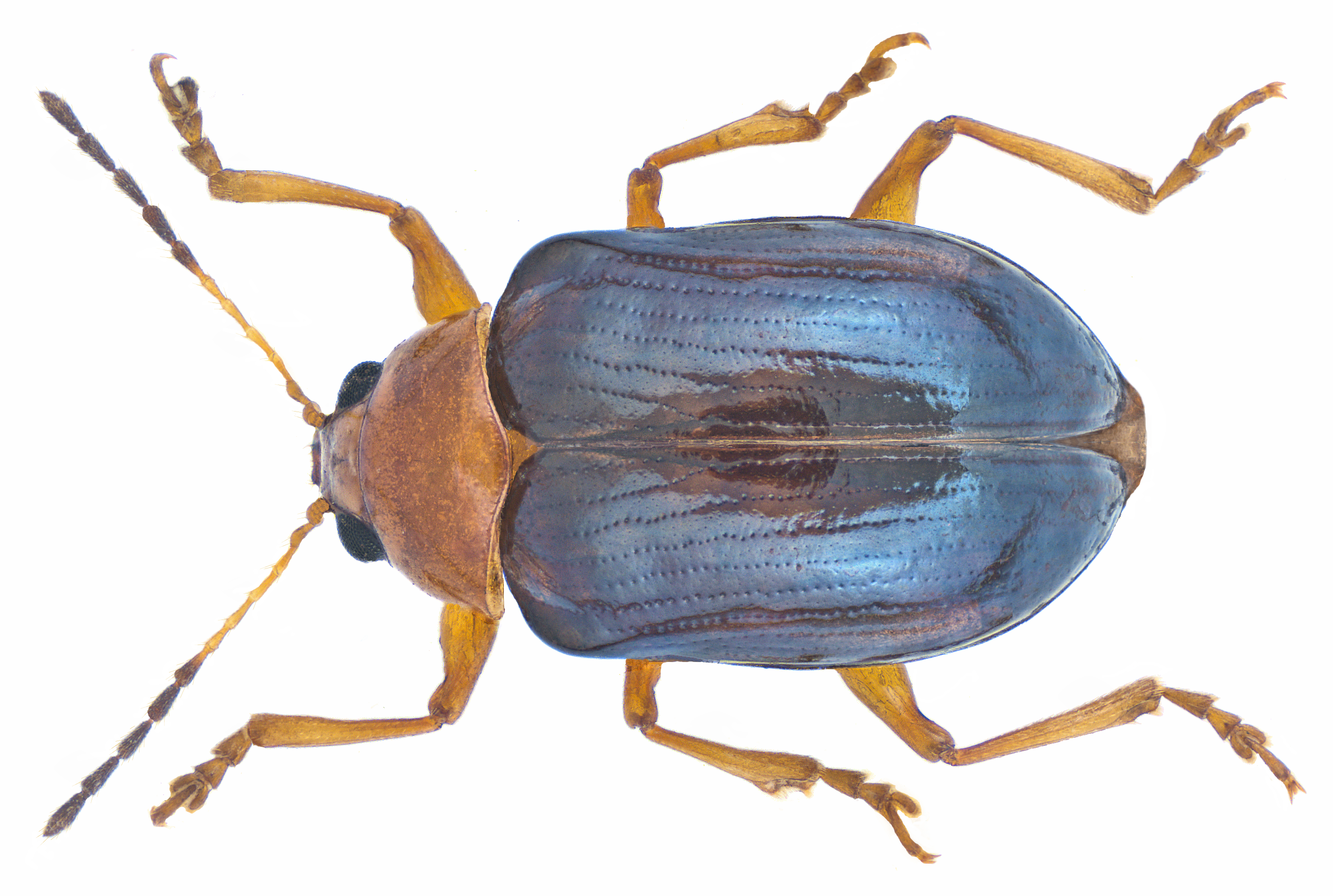
- Paraivongius bicolor

Scientific classification
- Kingdom: Animalia
- Phylum: Arthropoda
- Clade: Pancrustacea
- Class: Insecta
- Order: Coleoptera
- Suborder: Polyphaga
- Infraorder: Cucujiformia
- Family: Chrysomelidae
- Genus: Paraivongius
- Species: P. bicolor

Binomial name
- Paraivongius bicolor (Lefèvre, 1885)

Synonyms
- s.str: Rhembastus bicolor Lefèvre, 1885; arussinus: Rhembastus bicolor var. arussinus Gestro, 1895

= Paraivongius bicolor =

Species of beetle

Paraivongius bicolor is a species of leaf beetle of Angola and the Democratic Republic of the Congo. It was first described from Landana by Édouard Lefèvre in 1885.

== Subspecies ==
There are two subspecies of P. bicolor:

- Paraivongius bicolor arussinus (Gestro, 1895)
- Paraivongius bicolor bicolor (Lefèvre, 1885)
