= Paraivongius rufipes =

Scientific classification
- Kingdom: Animalia
- Phylum: Arthropoda
- Clade: Pancrustacea
- Class: Insecta
- Order: Coleoptera
- Suborder: Polyphaga
- Infraorder: Cucujiformia
- Family: Chrysomelidae
- Genus: Paraivongius
- Species: P. rufipes

Binomial name
- Paraivongius rufipes (Weise, 1883)

Synonyms
- Rhembastus rufipes (Weise, 1883); Syagrus rufipes Weise, 1883

Species of beetle

Paraivongius rufipes is a species of leaf beetle of Ghana and the Democratic Republic of the Congo. It was first described by Julius Weise in 1883.
