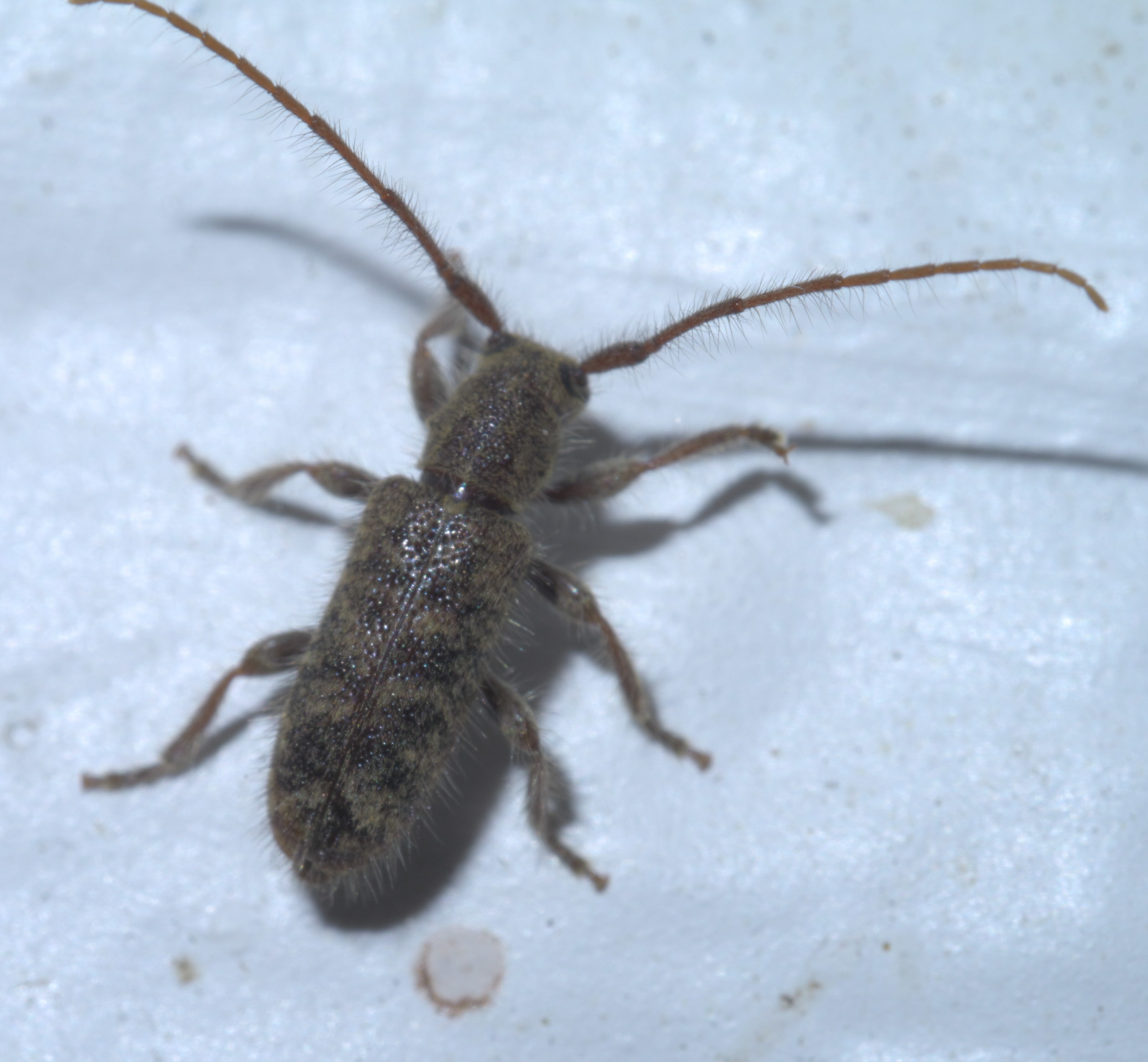

Scientific classification
- Domain: Eukaryota
- Kingdom: Animalia
- Phylum: Arthropoda
- Class: Insecta
- Order: Coleoptera
- Suborder: Polyphaga
- Infraorder: Cucujiformia
- Family: Cerambycidae
- Genus: Eupogonius
- Species: E. pauper

Binomial name
- Eupogonius pauper LeConte, 1852

= Eupogonius pauper =

Species of beetle

Eupogonius pauper is a species of beetle in the family Cerambycidae. It was described by John Lawrence LeConte in 1852. It is known from the United States.
