= Eupogonius longipilis =

Scientific classification
- Domain: Eukaryota
- Kingdom: Animalia
- Phylum: Arthropoda
- Class: Insecta
- Order: Coleoptera
- Suborder: Polyphaga
- Infraorder: Cucujiformia
- Family: Cerambycidae
- Genus: Eupogonius
- Species: E. longipilis

Binomial name
- Eupogonius longipilis Bates, 1880

Species of beetle

Eupogonius longipilis is a species of beetle in the family Cerambycidae. It was described by Henry Walter Bates in 1880. It is known from Guatemala, Honduras, and Mexico.
