= Sarum inermis =

Scientific classification
- Kingdom: Animalia
- Phylum: Arthropoda
- Clade: Pancrustacea
- Class: Insecta
- Order: Coleoptera
- Suborder: Polyphaga
- Infraorder: Cucujiformia
- Family: Chrysomelidae
- Genus: Sarum
- Species: S. inermis

Binomial name
- Sarum inermis (Jacoby, 1901)

Synonyms
- Rhembastus inermis Jacoby, 1901

Species of beetle

Sarum inermis is a species of leaf beetle of the Democratic Republic of the Congo, described by Martin Jacoby in 1901.
