= Paraivongius rubricollis =

Scientific classification
- Kingdom: Animalia
- Phylum: Arthropoda
- Clade: Pancrustacea
- Class: Insecta
- Order: Coleoptera
- Suborder: Polyphaga
- Infraorder: Cucujiformia
- Family: Chrysomelidae
- Genus: Paraivongius
- Species: P. rubricollis

Binomial name
- Paraivongius rubricollis Selman, 1972

Species of beetle

Paraivongius rubricollis is a species of leaf beetle. It is reported from the Republic of the Congo, the Democratic Republic of the Congo and South Sudan. It was first described from Garamba National Park by Brian J. Selman in 1972. Host plants for the species include Combretum verticillatum, C. binderianum, Combretum spp., Mitragyna stipulosa, and it has also been collected on Imperata cylindrica and Urena lobata.
