= Selmania =

Scientific classification
- Kingdom: Animalia
- Phylum: Arthropoda
- Clade: Pancrustacea
- Class: Insecta
- Order: Coleoptera
- Suborder: Polyphaga
- Infraorder: Cucujiformia
- Family: Chrysomelidae
- Subfamily: Eumolpinae
- Tribe: Typophorini
- Genus: Selmania; Zoia, 2019

Type species
- Rhembastus colasposomoides Burgeon, 1941

Synonyms
- Massartia Selman, 1965 (nec Conrad, 1926, nec Schouteden, 1952)

Genus of leaf beetles from Africa

Selmania is a genus of leaf beetles in the subfamily Eumolpinae, found in Africa. Most of the species in the genus were originally placed in Rhembastus.

The genus was originally named Massartia by Brian John Selman in 1965, but it was later found that the name had already been used for a dinoflagellate and a hemipteran. Because of this, Stefano Zoia renamed the genus to Selmania in 2019.

== Species ==
Eight species are included in the genus:

- Selmania albertiana (Burgeon, 1941) – DR Congo, Ivory Coast
- Selmania colasposomoides (Burgeon, 1941) – DR Congo
- Selmania hartmanni Zoia, 2019 – Zambia, DR Congo
- Selmania irregularis (Jacoby, 1900) – DR Congo
- Selmania minima (Burgeon, 1942) – DR Congo, Sudan
- Selmania nigrita (Selman, 1972) – DR Congo
- Selmania schoutedeni (Burgeon, 1941) – DR Congo
- Selmania sprecherae (Zoia, 2010) – Tanzania, Kenya
