= Eupogonius piceus =

Scientific classification
- Kingdom: Animalia
- Phylum: Arthropoda
- Clade: Pancrustacea
- Class: Insecta
- Order: Coleoptera
- Suborder: Polyphaga
- Infraorder: Cucujiformia
- Family: Cerambycidae
- Genus: Eupogonius
- Species: E. piceus

Binomial name
- Eupogonius piceus (Fisher, 1936)

Species of beetle

Eupogonius piceus is a species of beetle in the family Cerambycidae. It was described by Fisher in 1936. It is known from Cuba.
