= Paraivongius chalceatus =

Scientific classification
- Kingdom: Animalia
- Phylum: Arthropoda
- Clade: Pancrustacea
- Class: Insecta
- Order: Coleoptera
- Suborder: Polyphaga
- Infraorder: Cucujiformia
- Family: Chrysomelidae
- Genus: Paraivongius
- Subgenus: Paraivongius (Micromenius)
- Species: P. chalceatus

Binomial name
- Paraivongius chalceatus (Lefèvre, 1891)

Synonyms
- Menius chalceatus Lefèvre, 1891

Species of beetle

Paraivongius chalceatus is a species of leaf beetle of Cameroon, Ivory Coast and Mali. It was first described by Édouard Lefèvre in 1891.
