= Paraivongius elisabethanus =

Scientific classification
- Kingdom: Animalia
- Phylum: Arthropoda
- Clade: Pancrustacea
- Class: Insecta
- Order: Coleoptera
- Suborder: Polyphaga
- Infraorder: Cucujiformia
- Family: Chrysomelidae
- Genus: Paraivongius
- Species: P. elisabethanus

Binomial name
- Paraivongius elisabethanus (Burgeon, 1941)

Synonyms
- Rhembastus elisabethanus Burgeon, 1941

Species of beetle

Paraivongius elisabethanus is a species of leaf beetle of the Democratic Republic of the Congo. It was first described by the Belgian entomologist Louis Burgeon in 1941.
