= Paraivongius subaeneus =

Scientific classification
- Kingdom: Animalia
- Phylum: Arthropoda
- Clade: Pancrustacea
- Class: Insecta
- Order: Coleoptera
- Suborder: Polyphaga
- Infraorder: Cucujiformia
- Family: Chrysomelidae
- Genus: Paraivongius
- Species: P. subaeneus

Binomial name
- Paraivongius subaeneus (Jacoby, 1903)

Synonyms
- Rhembastus subaeneus Jacoby, 1903

Species of beetle

Paraivongius subaeneus is a species of leaf beetle of Cameroon and the Democratic Republic of the Congo. It was first described by Martin Jacoby in 1903.
