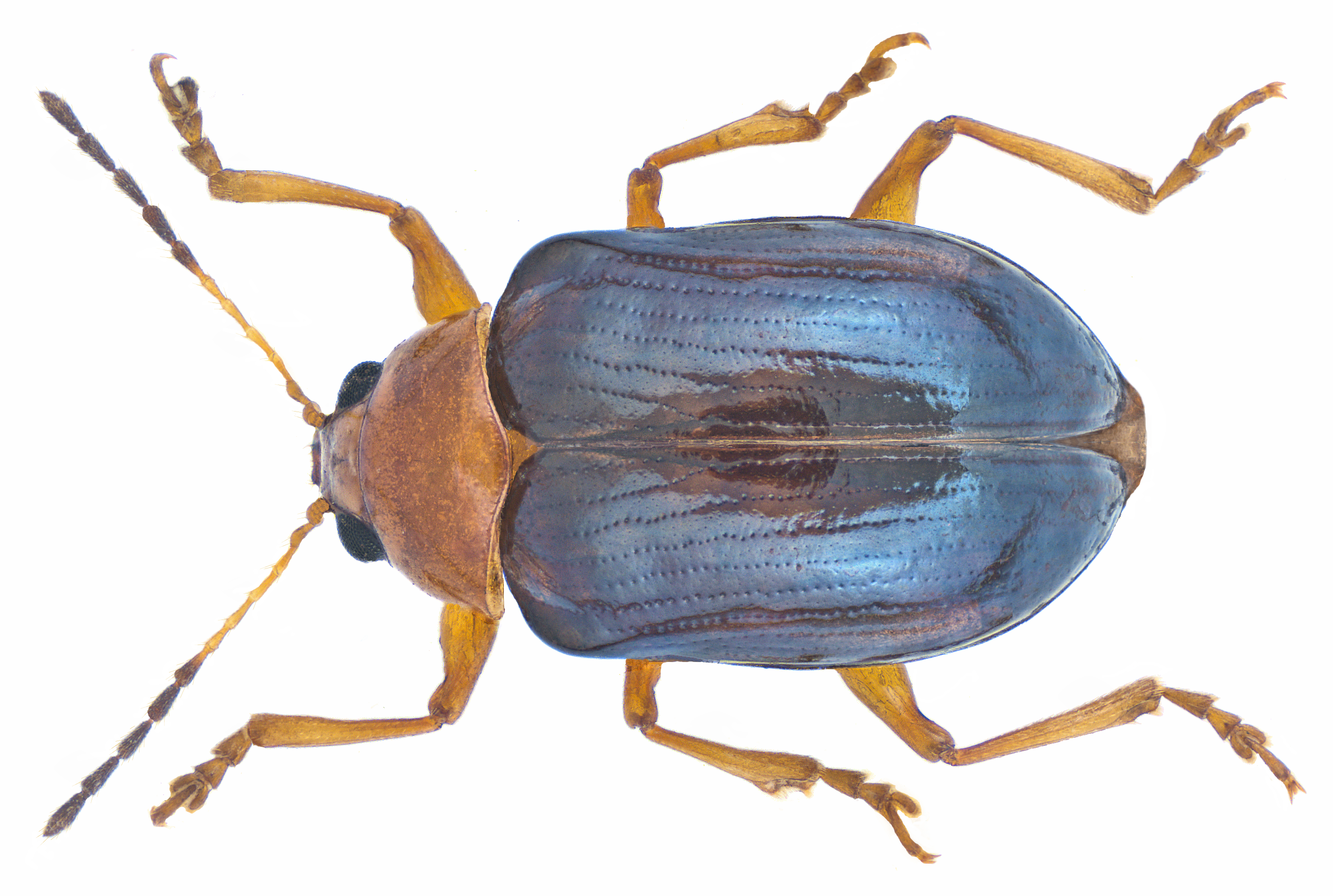
- Paraivongius bicolor

Scientific classification
- Kingdom: Animalia
- Phylum: Arthropoda
- Clade: Pancrustacea
- Class: Insecta
- Order: Coleoptera
- Suborder: Polyphaga
- Infraorder: Cucujiformia
- Family: Chrysomelidae
- Subfamily: Eumolpinae
- Tribe: Typophorini
- Genus: Paraivongius; Pic, 1936

Type species
- Paraivongius metallicus Pic, 1936

= Paraivongius =

Genus of leaf beetles from Africa

Paraivongius is a genus of leaf beetles in the subfamily Eumolpinae. It is distributed in Africa.

== Species ==
Subgenus Paraivongius Pic, 1936

- Paraivongius akaensis Selman, 1972
- Paraivongius apricus Zoia, 2017
- Paraivongius armatus (Burgeon, 1941)
- Paraivongius bagbelensis Selman, 1972
- Paraivongius bayeri (Burgeon, 1942)
- Paraivongius bequaerti (Burgeon, 1941)
- Paraivongius bicolor (Lefèvre, 1885)
  - Paraivongius bicolor bicolor (Lefèvre, 1885)
  - Paraivongius bicolor arussinus (Gestro, 1895)
- Paraivongius bicolorimembris (Pic, 1940)
- Paraivongius bicoloripes (Pic, 1939)
- Paraivongius brevicornis Zoia, 2017
- Paraivongius castaneus Zoia, 2017
- Paraivongius coeruleus (Bryant, 1954)
- Paraivongius coffeae (Bryant, 1938)
- Paraivongius collarti (Burgeon, 1941)
- Paraivongius costatus (Jacoby, 1894)
- Paraivongius curtus Pic, 1952
- Paraivongius cyanipennis (Gerstaecker, 1871)
- Paraivongius demoulinensis Selman, 1972
- Paraivongius disconotatus (Pic, 1939)
- Paraivongius distanti (Jacoby, 1892)
- Paraivongius diversicolor Pic, 1953
- Paraivongius diversipennis (Pic, 1940)
- Paraivongius diversitarsis (Pic, 1952)
- Paraivongius duruensis Selman, 1972
- Paraivongius elisabethanus (Burgeon, 1941)
- Paraivongius emaliensis (Bryant, 1954)
- Paraivongius flavimanus (Jacoby, 1903)
  - Paraivongius flavimanus flavimanus (Jacoby, 1903)
  - Paraivongius flavimanus scheitzae (Burgeon, 1941)
- Paraivongius flavitarsus (Jacoby, 1893)
- Paraivongius fulvicornis (Jacoby, 1897)
- Paraivongius fulvus Selman, 1972
- Paraivongius gabonicus (Pic, 1952)
- Paraivongius garambaensis Selman, 1972
- Paraivongius geniculatus (Lefèvre, 1891)
- Paraivongius gossypii (Bryant, 1937)
- Paraivongius humeralis Zoia, 2017
- Paraivongius hypomelas (Lefèvre, 1886)
- Paraivongius inapicalis (Pic, 1940)
- Paraivongius inexspectatus Zoia, 2017
- Paraivongius interstitialis (Jacoby, 1900)
- Paraivongius jacobyi Selman, 1965
- Paraivongius katangensis (Burgeon, 1941)
- Paraivongius kraatzi (Jacoby, 1898)
- Paraivongius lepesmei (Burgeon, 1941)
- Paraivongius limbatus (Lefèvre, 1891)
- Paraivongius maynei (Burgeon, 1941)
- Paraivongius metallicus Pic, 1936
- Paraivongius micans (Gerstaecker, 1871)
- Paraivongius milliaui (Burgeon, 1941)
- Paraivongius mimicus Pic, 1953
- Paraivongius minimus Pic, 1952
- Paraivongius monardi (Pic, 1939)
- Paraivongius motoensis (Burgeon, 1941)
- Paraivongius mouyassuensis Selman, 1973
- Paraivongius murrayi (Baly, 1878)
- Paraivongius nigripes (Jacoby, 1900)
- Paraivongius nigritarsis (Lefèvre, 1891)
- Paraivongius parvulus (Jacoby, 1903)
- Paraivongius pauliani (Burgeon, 1941)
- Paraivongius pidigalaensis Selman, 1972
- Paraivongius plagiatus (Lefèvre, 1891)
- Paraivongius pomorum (Bryant, 1931)
- Paraivongius pseudobscurellus (Burgeon, 1942)
- Paraivongius pseudoparvulus (Burgeon, 1941)
- Paraivongius recticollis (Jacoby, 1898)
- Paraivongius rotundatus (Burgeon, 1941)
- Paraivongius ruandicus (Weise, 1912)
- Paraivongius rubricollis Selman, 1972
- Paraivongius rufipes (Weise, 1883)
- Paraivongius rufometallicus (Pic, 1951)
- Paraivongius ruwenzoricus (Burgeon, 1942)
- Paraivongius saegeri Selman, 1972
- Paraivongius scapularis (Burgeon, 1941)
- Paraivongius semipiceus (Jacoby, 1903)
- Paraivongius subaeneus (Jacoby, 1903)
- Paraivongius tarsalis (Lefèvre, 1887)
- Paraivongius testaceipes (Pic, 1940)
- Paraivongius theresae Pic, 1952
- Paraivongius uniformis (Jacoby, 1900)
- Paraivongius varicolor (Lefèvre, 1891)
- Paraivongius viridecinctus (Pic, 1940)
- Paraivongius viridescens (Pic, 1952)
- Paraivongius viridiaeneus (Jacoby, 1882)
- Paraivongius viridicollis (Pic, 1940)
- Paraivongius viridipes Pic, 1952
- Paraivongius viridis (Jacoby, 1898)
- Paraivongius viridissimus Pic, 1952
- Paraivongius wittei (Burgeon, 1942)

Subgenus Micromenius Pic, 1953

- Paraivongius auratus (Weise, 1883)
- Paraivongius chalceatus (Lefèvre, 1891)
- Paraivongius concolor (Pic, 1953)
- Paraivongius feai Zoia, 2017
- Paraivongius ivoirensis Pic, 1952
- Paraivongius nitidissimus (Pic, 1953)
- Paraivongius obscuripes (Pic, 1952)
- Paraivongius ruficeps (Pic, 1939)
- Paraivongius rufus (Pic, 1940)
- Paraivongius simplex (Weise, 1909)

Synonyms:

- Menius rufipes Lefèvre, 1891 (preoccupied by Paraivongius rufipes (Weise, 1883)): renamed to Paraivongius jacobyi Selman, 1965
- Paraivongius congoensis (Burgeon, 1942): moved to Afroeurydemus
- Paraivongius viridinitens (Bryant, 1954): synonym of Paraivongius parvulus (Jacoby, 1903)
