= Eupogonius subaeneus =

Scientific classification
- Domain: Eukaryota
- Kingdom: Animalia
- Phylum: Arthropoda
- Class: Insecta
- Order: Coleoptera
- Suborder: Polyphaga
- Infraorder: Cucujiformia
- Family: Cerambycidae
- Genus: Eupogonius
- Species: E. subaeneus

Binomial name
- Eupogonius subaeneus Bates, 1872

Synonyms
- Eupogonius columbianus Breuning, 1942

Species of beetle

Eupogonius subaeneus is a species of beetle in the family Cerambycidae. It was described by Bates in 1872. It is known from Nicaragua, French Guiana and Colombia.
