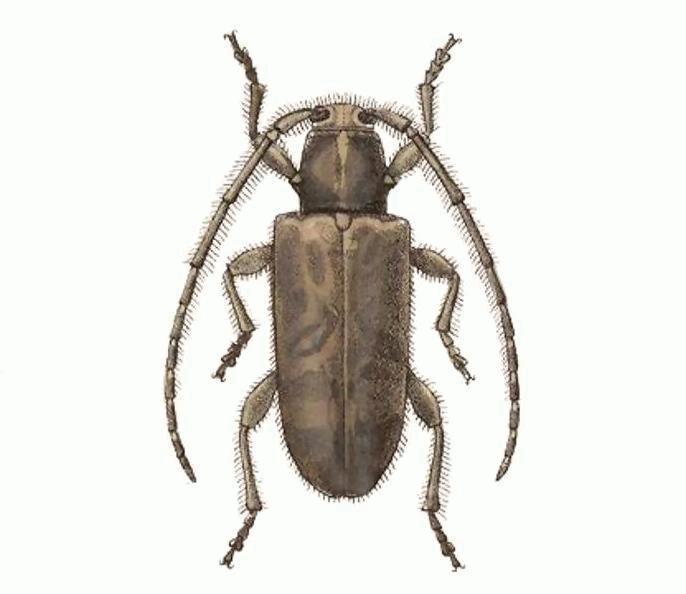
- Eupogonius ursulus

Scientific classification
- Kingdom: Animalia
- Phylum: Arthropoda
- Clade: Pancrustacea
- Class: Insecta
- Order: Coleoptera
- Suborder: Polyphaga
- Infraorder: Cucujiformia
- Family: Cerambycidae
- Subfamily: Lamiinae
- Tribe: Desmiphorini
- Genus: Eupogonius; Leconte, 1852

= Eupogonius =

Genus of beetles

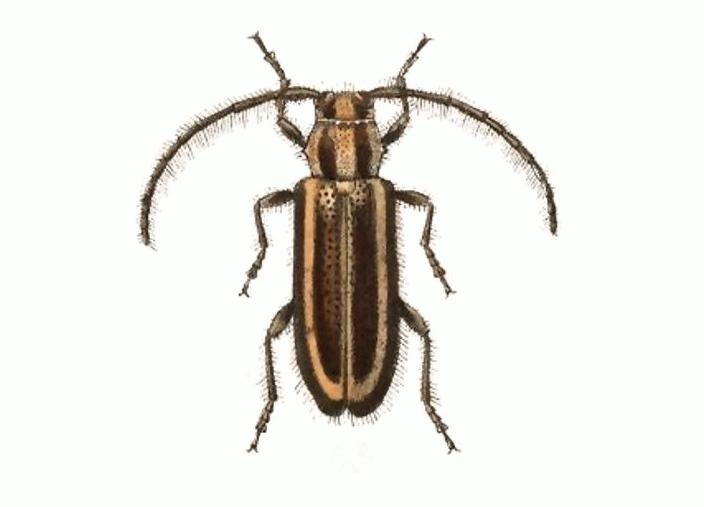
Eupogonius flavocinctus

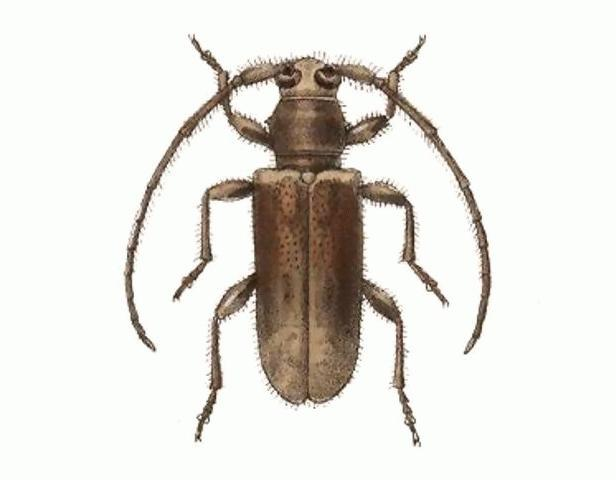
Eupogonius infimus

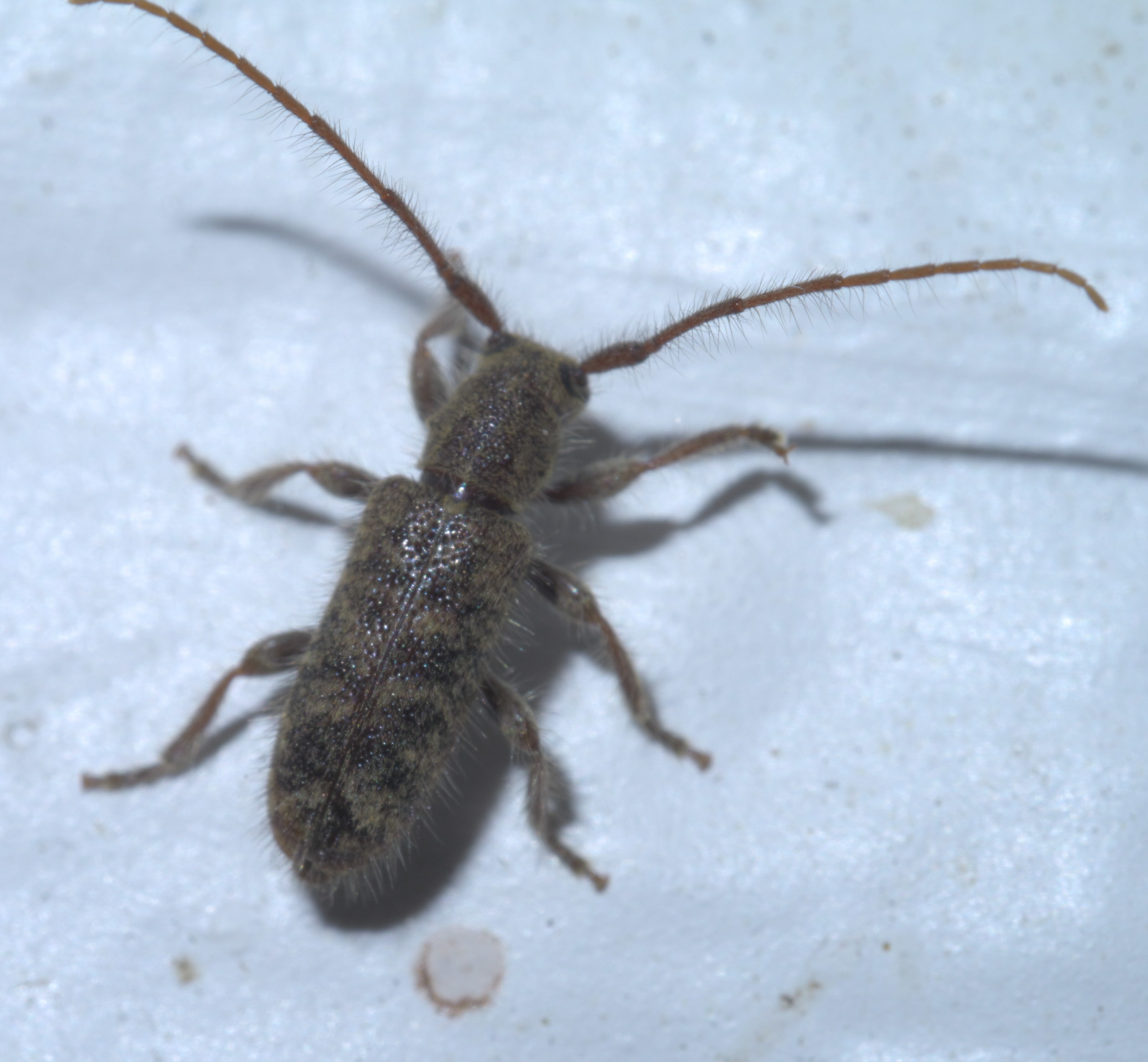
The type species of the genus, Eupogonius pauper

Eupogonius is a genus of longhorn beetles of the subfamily Lamiinae. It was described in Journal of the Academy of Natural Sciences of Philadelphia by John Lawrence LeConte in 1852. The species live across Eastern North America, south to Argentina, in forests and woodlots.

== Species ==
Eupogonius contains the following species:

- Eupogonius affinis Breuning, 1942
- Eupogonius albipilis Breuning, 1955
- Eupogonius albofasciatus Wappes & Santos-Silva, 2020
- Eupogonius annulicornis Fisher, 1926
- Eupogonius apicicornis Bates, 1885
- Eupogonius apomecynoides Bezark, Botero & Santos-Silva, 2022
- Eupogonius arizonensis Knull, 1954
- Eupogonius azteca Martins, Santos-Silva & Galileo, 2015
- Eupogonius bierigi Melzer, 1933
- Eupogonius boteroi Wappes & Santos-Silva, 2020
- Eupogonius brevifascia Galileo & Martins, 2009
- Eupogonius comus Bates, 1885
- Eupogonius copei Bezark, Botero & Santos-Silva, 2022
- Eupogonius cryptus Hovore, 1989
- Eupogonius cyaneus Zajciw, 1962
- Eupogonius dubiosus (Breuning, 1942)
- Eupogonius flavocinctus Bates, 1872
- Eupogonius flavovittatus Breuning, 1942
- Eupogonius fulvovestitus Schaeffer, 1905
- Eupogonius fuscovitatus Breuning, 1974
- Eupogonius giesberti Santos-Silva, Wappes & Galileo, 2018
- Eupogonius griseus Fisher, 1926
- Eupogonius guerrerensis Wappes & Santos-Silva, 2020
- Eupogonius hagmanni Melzer, 1927
- Eupogonius haitiensis Fisher, 1935
- Eupogonius infimus (Thomson, 1868)
- Eupogonius intonsus Martins & Galileo, 2012
- Eupogonius laetus Bates, 1885
- Eupogonius lanuginosus (Chevrolat, 1862)
- Eupogonius lateralis Martins & Galileo, 2009
- Eupogonius lineolatus Melzer, 1933
- Eupogonius longipilis Bates, 1880
- Eupogonius maculicornis (Chevrolat, 1862)
- Eupogonius major Bates, 1885
- Eupogonius marmoratus Fisher, 1925
- Eupogonius microphthalmus Breuning, 1943
- Eupogonius monnei Pérez-Flores, 2026
- Eupogonius monzoni Wappes & Santos-Silva, 2020
- Eupogonius nascimentoi Wappes & Santos-Silva, 2020
- Eupogonius nigrinus (Bates, 1866)
- Eupogonius nigritarsis Fisher, 1926
- Eupogonius obrienorum Galileo & Santos-Silva, 2017
- Eupogonius pauper LeConte, 1852
- Eupogonius petulans Melzer, 1933
- Eupogonius piceus (Fisher, 1936)
- Eupogonius pilosulus (Chevrolat, 1862)
- Eupogonius piperita (Bates, 1885)
- Eupogonius pubescens LeConte, 1873
- Eupogonius pubicollis Melzer, 1933
- Eupogonius pulcher Bezark & Santos‑Silva, 2023
- Eupogonius rileyi Santos-Silva, 2022
- Eupogonius scutellaris Bates, 1885
- Eupogonius similis Santos-Silva, 2022
- Eupogonius stellatus Chemsak & Noguera, 1993
- Eupogonius strandi Breuning, 1942
- Eupogonius subaeneus Bates, 1872
- Eupogonius subarmatus (LeConte, 1859)
- Eupogonius subnudus Bates, 1885
- Eupogonius subtessellatus Melzer, 1933
- Eupogonius superbus (Zayas, 1975)
- Eupogonius tlanchinolensis Wappes & Santos-Silva, 2020
- Eupogonius tomentosus (Haldeman, 1847)
- Eupogonius triangularis Linsley, 1935
- Eupogonius ursulus Bates, 1872
- Eupogonius vandykei Linsley, 1935
- Eupogonius virgatus Bezark, Botero & Santos-Silva, 2022
- Eupogonius vittipennis Bates, 1885
- Eupogonius wappesi Lingafelter, Morris, Skillman, & Santos-Silva, 2021
- Eupogonius wickhami Fisher, 1935
- Eupogonius yeiuba Martins & Galileo, 2005
