= Menius (beetle) =

Scientific classification
- Kingdom: Animalia
- Phylum: Arthropoda
- Clade: Pancrustacea
- Class: Insecta
- Order: Coleoptera
- Suborder: Polyphaga
- Infraorder: Cucujiformia
- Family: Chrysomelidae
- Subfamily: Eumolpinae
- Tribe: Typophorini
- Genus: Menius; Chapuis, 1874

Type species
- Menius lacordairei Chapuis, 1874

Genus of leaf beetles from Africa

Menius is a genus of leaf beetles in the subfamily Eumolpinae. It is known from Africa.

== Species ==
- Menius conradti Jacoby, 1903 – Cameroon
- Menius cyaneipes Pic, 1939 – Guinea?
- Menius lacordairei Chapuis, 1874 – Nigeria, Cameroon
- Menius madagascariensis Jacoby, 1897 – Madagascar
- Menius mombassanus Burgeon, 1942 – DR Congo
- Menius purpureus Pic, 1939 – Gabon
- Menius splendidus Jacoby, 1893 – Cameroon, Gabon
- Menius subcostatus Jacoby, 1893 – Cameroon, Gabon, Equatorial Guinea
- Menius viridicupreus Burgeon, 1941 – DR Congo
