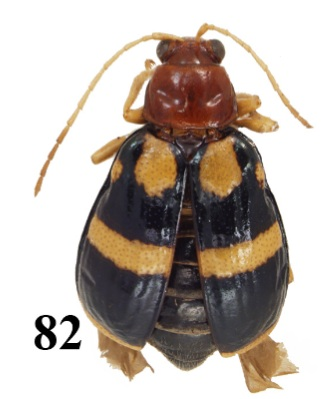

Scientific classification
- Kingdom: Animalia
- Phylum: Arthropoda
- Clade: Pancrustacea
- Class: Insecta
- Order: Coleoptera
- Suborder: Polyphaga
- Infraorder: Cucujiformia
- Family: Chrysomelidae
- Genus: Gynandrobrotica
- Species: G. ventricosa

Binomial name
- Gynandrobrotica ventricosa (Jacoby, 1878)

Synonyms
- Diabrotica ventricosa Jacoby, 1878

= Gynandrobrotica ventricosa =

Species of beetle

Gynandrobrotica ventricosa is a species of beetle of the family Chrysomelidae. It is found in Ecuador.
