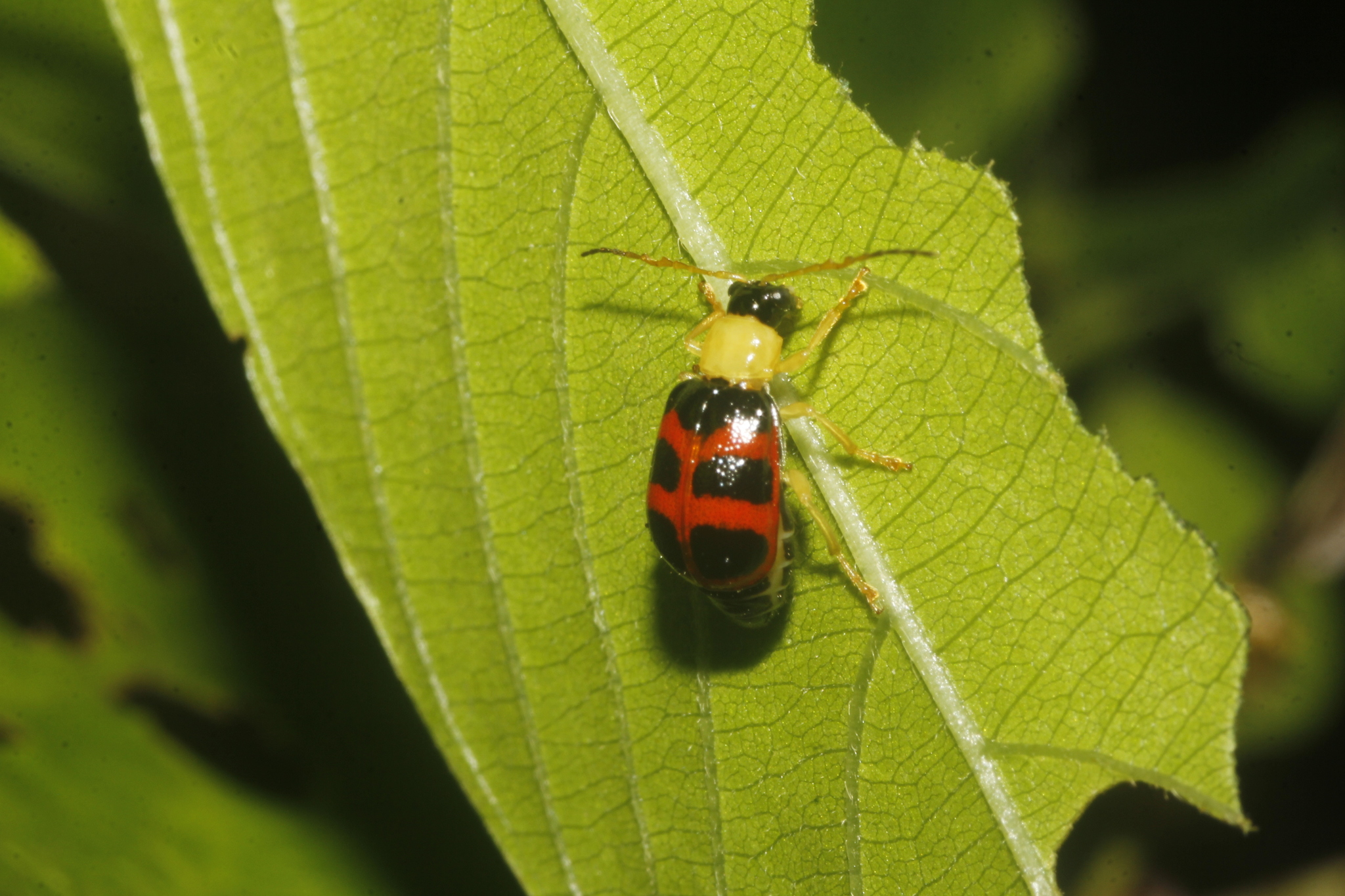
- Gynandrobrotica nigrofasciata, México

Scientific classification
- Kingdom: Animalia
- Phylum: Arthropoda
- Clade: Pancrustacea
- Class: Insecta
- Order: Coleoptera
- Suborder: Polyphaga
- Infraorder: Cucujiformia
- Family: Chrysomelidae
- Subfamily: Galerucinae
- Tribe: Luperini
- Subtribe: Diabroticina
- Genus: Gynandrobrotica; Bechyné, 1955

= Gynandrobrotica =

Genus of leaf beetles

Gynandrobrotica is a genus of skeletonizing leaf beetles in the family Chrysomelidae, found in the Neotropics. The genus contains at least 13 species.

== Species ==
These 13 species belong to the genus Gynandrobrotica:

- Gynandrobrotica caviceps (Baly, 1889)
- Gynandrobrotica equestris (Fabricius, 1787)
- Gynandrobrotica gestroi (Baly, 1889)
- Gynandrobrotica guerreroensis (Jacoby, 1892)
- Gynandrobrotica imitans (Jacoby, 1879)
- Gynandrobrotica jucunda (Baly, 1886)
- Gynandrobrotica lepida (Say, 1835)
- Gynandrobrotica nigrofasciata (Jacoby, 1889)
- Gynandrobrotica stevensi (Baly, 1886)
- Gynandrobrotica subsimilis (Baly, 1891)
- Gynandrobrotica tarsata (Gahan, 1891)
- Gynandrobrotica variabilis (Jacoby, 1887)
- Gynandrobrotica ventricosa (Jacoby, 1878)
