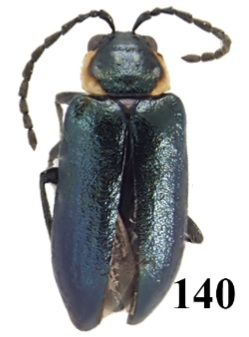

Scientific classification
- Kingdom: Animalia
- Phylum: Arthropoda
- Clade: Pancrustacea
- Class: Insecta
- Order: Coleoptera
- Suborder: Polyphaga
- Infraorder: Cucujiformia
- Family: Chrysomelidae
- Genus: Halinella
- Species: H. malachioides

Binomial name
- Halinella malachioides Bechyne, 1956

= Halinella malachioides =

Species of beetle

Halinella malachioides is a species of beetle of the family Chrysomelidae. It is found in Bolivia.
