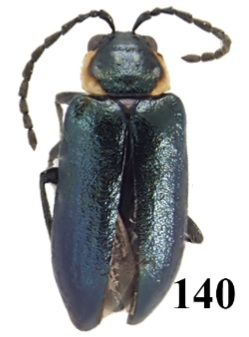
- Halinella malachioides, an example of the genus Halinella.

Scientific classification
- Kingdom: Animalia
- Phylum: Arthropoda
- Clade: Pancrustacea
- Class: Insecta
- Order: Coleoptera
- Suborder: Polyphaga
- Infraorder: Cucujiformia
- Family: Chrysomelidae
- Tribe: Luperini
- Subtribe: Luperina
- Genus: Halinella; Bechyné, 1956

= Halinella =

Genus of leaf beetles

Halinella is a genus of beetles belonging to the family Chrysomelidae.

== Species ==
- Halinella bruchii Bowditch, 1956
- Halinella callangensis Bechyne, 1956
- Halinella coroicensis Bechyne, 1956
- Halinella costulata Bechyne & Bechyne, 1969
- Halinella hebardi (Bowditch, 1925)
- Halinella kirschi (Harold, 1875)
- Halinella malachioides Bechyne, 1956
- Halinella spilothorax (Bechyne, 1956)
- Halinella suturalis (Bowditch, 1925)
