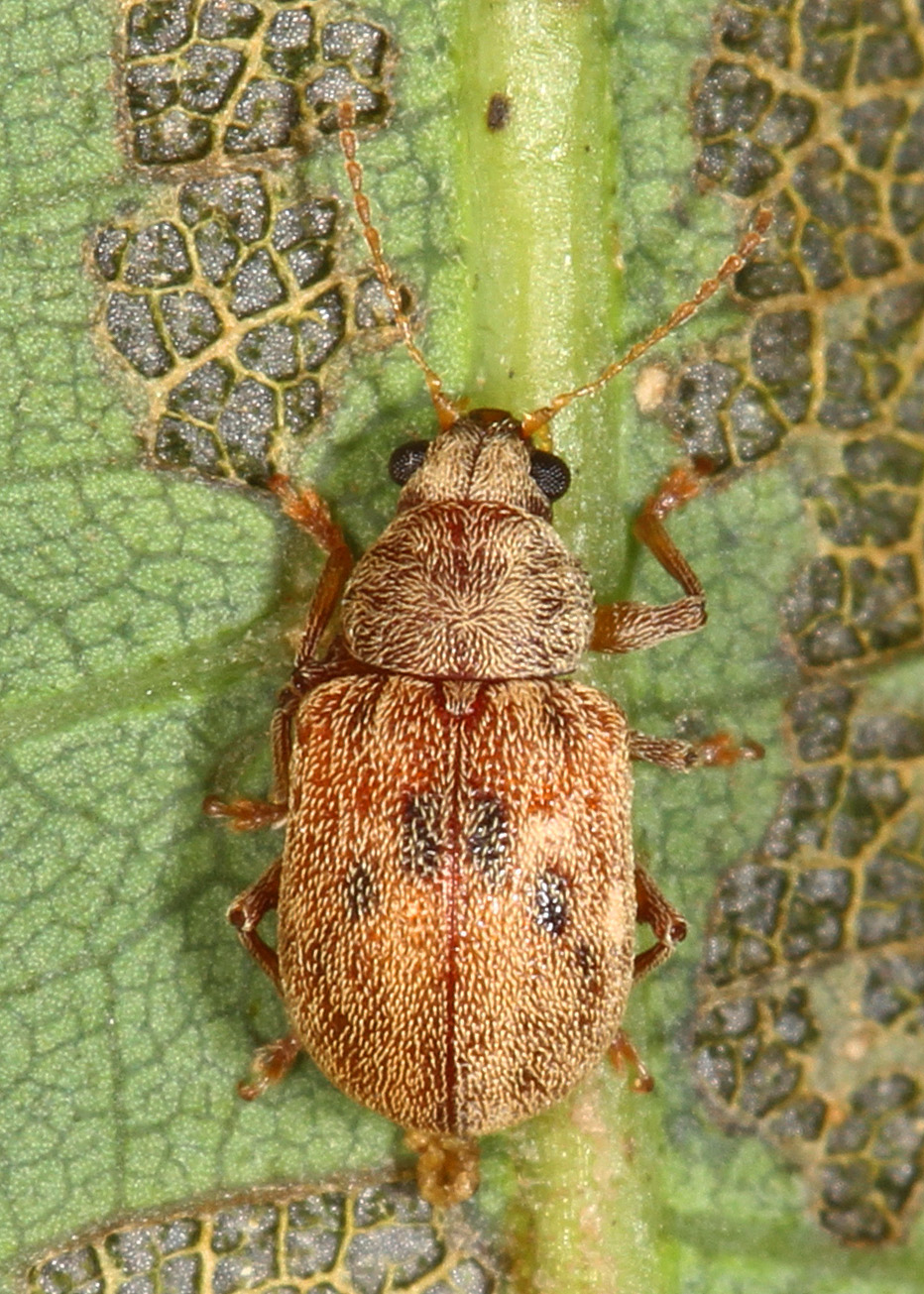
- Demotina modesta

Scientific classification
- Kingdom: Animalia
- Phylum: Arthropoda
- Clade: Pancrustacea
- Class: Insecta
- Order: Coleoptera
- Suborder: Polyphaga
- Infraorder: Cucujiformia
- Family: Chrysomelidae
- Subfamily: Eumolpinae
- Tribe: Bromiini
- Genus: Demotina; Baly, 1863

Type species
- Demotina bowringii Baly, 1863

Synonyms
- Leprotes Weise, 1923 (nec Baly, 1863)

= Demotina =

Genus of leaf beetles

Demotina is a genus of leaf beetles in the subfamily Eumolpinae. There are over 50 described species in Demotina. The genus is native to Asia, Australia and Oceania, though one species (Demotina modesta) is an adventive species in the southeastern United States in North America. Some species are known to be parthenogenetic.

Species of Demotina described from Fiji and Vanuatu differ from the Asian species by the presence of emarginations on the middle and hind legs, a characteristic of the Typophorini. Because of this and other differences, the species from Fiji and Vanuatu were provisionally transferred to the genus Parademotina by Gómez-Zurita (2024).

== Species ==
These species belong to the genus Demotina:

Asian species:

- Demotina albomaculata Tan, 1992 – Southwestern China (Sichuan)
- Demotina alni Chûjô, 1956^{g} – Taiwan
- Demotina andrewesi Jacoby, 1904 – Southern India
- Demotina atra (Pic, 1923) – Southwestern China (Yunnan), Vietnam
- Demotina aurosquama Chûjô, 1961 – Japan
- Demotina bicoloriceps Tan, 1992 – Southwestern China (Yunnan)
- Demotina bicostata Medvedev, 2007 – Vietnam
- Demotina bipunctata Jacoby, 1885 – Japan
- Demotina bivittata Baly, 1867 – Seram
- Demotina bowringii Baly, 1863 – Southern China, Thailand, Laos, Vietnam
- Demotina ceylonensis Jacoby, 1887 – Sri Lanka
- Demotina collaris Eroshkina, 1992 – Vietnam
- Demotina costata Eroshkina, 1992 – Vietnam
- Demotina decorata Baly, 1874 – Japan, South Korea
- Demotina decoratella Chûjô, 1956^{g} – Taiwan
- Demotina elegans Chûjô & Shirôzu, 1955^{g} – Japan
- Demotina fasciata Baly, 1874 – East China (Jiangxi), Taiwan, Japan, South Korea
- Demotina fasciculata Baly, 1874 – Southern China, Japan, South Korea
- Demotina flavicornis Tan & Zhou in Zhou & Tan, 1997 – Southern China
- Demotina gansuica Chen, 1940 – Northwestern China (Gansu)
- Demotina grisea Baly, 1867 – Borneo (Sarawak)
- Demotina imasakai Isono, 1990 – Japan
- Demotina inaequalis (Pic, 1927) – Southwestern China
- Demotina incostata Takizawa, 1978^{g} – Taiwan
- Demotina inhirsuta (Pic, 1923) – China, Vietnam
- Demotina jansoni Baly, 1867 – Waigeo
- Demotina javanensis Bryant, 1946 – Java
- Demotina lateralis Gahan, 1900 – Christmas Island
- Demotina lewisi Jacoby, 1887 – Sri Lanka
- Demotina major Chûjô, 1958 – Japan
- Demotina medvedevi Moseyko, 2005 – Vietnam
- Demotina medvedeviana Moseyko, 2006 – Vietnam
- Demotina minuta Jacoby, 1908 – Nepal, India (Assam)
- Demotina minutella Moseyko, 2005 – Vietnam
- Demotina modesta Baly, 1874^{i c g b} – Taiwan, Japan, Nepal, South Korea, United States (introduced)
- Demotina montana Chûjô, 1956^{g} – Taiwan
- Demotina multinotata Pic, 1929 – Southwestern China (Yunnan)
- Demotina murina Baly, 1867 – Peninsular Malaysia, Java
- Demotina ornata Baly, 1867 – Seram
- Demotina parvula Baly, 1867 – Sulawesi
- Demotina pauperata Baly, 1867 – Western New Guinea (Manokwari)
- Demotina piceonotata Pic, 1929 – Western China (Shaanxi, Yunnan)
- Demotina postica Chen, 1935 – Southwestern China (Guizhou)
- Demotina pseudoimasakai Park, 2013 – South Korea
- Demotina pustulosa Chen, 1935 – Southwestern China (Guizhou)
- Demotina quercicola Takizawa, 2017 – Borneo (Sabah)
- Demotina regularis Eroshkina, 1992 – Vietnam
- Demotina rufonotata (Pic, 1924) – Vietnam
- Demotina rufopicea Baly, 1867 – Sulawesi
- Demotina rugicollis Baly, 1867 – Sulawesi
- Demotina sapensis Romantsov & Moseyko, 2019 – Vietnam
- Demotina sasakawai Nakane & Kimoto, 1959 – Japan
- Demotina serriventris Isono, 1990^{g} – Taiwan, Japan, Nepal
- Demotina silvatica Eroshkina, 1992 – Vietnam
- Demotina squamosa Isono, 1990 – Japan
- Demotina sumatrana Jacoby, 1896 – Sumatra
- Demotina thei Chen, 1940 – Southern China (Guangxi, Yunnan)
- Demotina thoracica Jacoby, 1887 – Sri Lanka
- Demotina tuberosa Chen, 1935 – Southern China, Japan, Laos, Vietnam
- Demotina vernalis Isono, 1990 – Japan
- Demotina vietnamica Eroshkina, 1992 – Vietnam
- Demotina wallacei Baly, 1867 – Sulawesi
- Demotina weisei Eroshkina, 1992 – Vietnam

Australian species:

- Demotina australis (Weise, 1923)

Oceanian (Fiji/Vanuatu) species:

- Demotina albonotata Bryant, 1931 – Fiji
- Demotina bifasciata Bryant, 1957 – Fiji
- Demotina cylindricollis Gressitt, 1957 – Fiji
- Demotina difficilis Bryant, 1936 – Vanuatu
- Demotina dissimilis Bryant, 1931 – Fiji
- Demotina evansi Bryant, 1931 – Fiji
- Demotina flavipes Bryant, 1936 – Vanuatu
- Demotina fragilis Gressitt, 1957 – Fiji
- Demotina fulva Bryant, 1931 – Fiji
- Demotina glochidiona Gressitt, 1957 – Fiji
- Demotina irregularis Bryant, 1957 – Fiji
- Demotina metallica Bryant, 1957 – Fiji
- Demotina nodosa Bryant, 1957 – Fiji
- Demotina obscurata Bryant, 1931 – Fiji
- Demotina pallipes Bryant, 1957 – Fiji
- Demotina pubescens Gressitt, 1957 – Fiji
- Demotina rugosata Gressitt, 1957 – Fiji
- Demotina striata Bryant, 1957 – Fiji
- Demotina veitchi Bryant, 1931 – Fiji
- Demotina vitiensis Bryant, 1931 – Fiji

Synonyms:

- Demotina balyi Jacoby, 1889: moved to Hyperaxis
- Demotina minuta Eroshkina, 1992 (preoccupied by D. minuta Jacoby, 1908): renamed to Demotina minutella Moseyko, 2005
- Demotina nigrita Eroshkina, 1992: moved to Hyperaxis
- Demotina punctata Takizawa, 1978: synonym of Demotina montana Chûjô, 1956
- Demotina serraticollis Baly, 1867: moved to Pseudometaxis

Data sources: i = ITIS, c = Catalogue of Life, g = GBIF, b = Bugguide.net
