= Lepinaria =

Scientific classification
- Kingdom: Animalia
- Phylum: Arthropoda
- Clade: Pancrustacea
- Class: Insecta
- Order: Coleoptera
- Suborder: Polyphaga
- Infraorder: Cucujiformia
- Family: Chrysomelidae
- Subfamily: Eumolpinae
- Tribe: Bromiini
- Genus: Lepinaria; Medvedev, 1998
- Species: L. merkli

Binomial name
- Lepinaria merkli Medvedev, 1998

Synonyms
- Genus: Pseudolepis Medvedev & Zoia, 2001; Species: Pseudolepis squamosa Medvedev & Zoia, 2001

Genus of leaf beetles

Lepinaria is a genus of leaf beetles in the subfamily Eumolpinae. It contains only one species, Lepinaria merkli, found in Peninsular Malaysia. It was first described from Tioman Island, an island off the east coast of Peninsular Malaysia. It is related to Lepina, but with a body form resembling that of Pachnephorus. It is also considered the genus most similar to Pachnephoptrus.

The genus Pseudolepis and species Pseudolepis squamosa, described from Peninsular Malaysia in the vicinity of Kuala Lumpur, were determined to be synonyms of Lepinaria and Lepinaria merkli by A. G. Moseyko in 2026.
