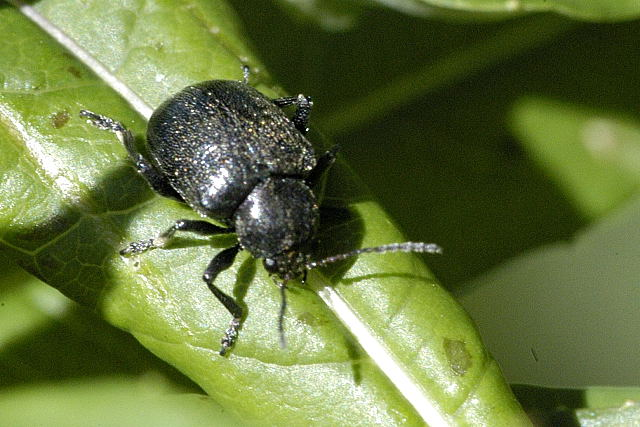
- Bromius obscurus

Scientific classification
- Kingdom: Animalia
- Phylum: Arthropoda
- Clade: Pancrustacea
- Class: Insecta
- Order: Coleoptera
- Suborder: Polyphaga
- Infraorder: Cucujiformia
- Family: Chrysomelidae
- Subfamily: Eumolpinae
- Tribe: Bromiini; Baly, 1865 (1863)

Synonyms
- Adoxini Baly, 1863; Cynoini Clavareau, 1914; Ebooini Reid, 1993; Eubrachini Jacoby, 1908; Heteraspini Baly, 1863; Leprotini Chapuis, 1874; Lypesthini Chûjô, 1956; Myochroini Baly, 1865; Nerissini Kuntzen, 1912; Odontionopini Clavareau, 1914; Pseudocolaspini Chapuis, 1874; Scelodontini Chapuis, 1874; Tomyrini Chapuis, 1874; Trichochryseini Clavareau, 1914

= Bromiini =

Tribe of leaf beetles

Bromiini (or Adoxini) is a tribe of leaf beetles in the subfamily Eumolpinae. The tribe contains approximately 120 genera, which are found worldwide. They are generally thought to be an artificial group, often with a subcylindrical prothorax without lateral ridges and covered with setae or scales.

== Nomenclature ==
The name "Bromiini" is conserved over the older name "Adoxini" because of Article 40(2) of the ICZN, which states: "If ... a family-group name was replaced before 1961 because of the synonymy of the type genus, the substitute name is to be maintained if it is in prevailing usage. A name maintained by virtue of this Article retains its own author but takes the priority of the replaced name, of which it is deemed to be the senior synonym." Bromiini is cited with its own author and date, followed by the date of the replaced name in parentheses: Bromiini Baly, 1865 (1863).

== Taxonomy ==
Following the leaf beetle classification of Seeno and Wilcox (1982), the genera of Bromiini are divided into eight informal groups or "sections": Bromiites, Leprotites, Myochroites, Nerissites, Pseudocolaspites, Scelodontites, Tomyrites and Trichochryseites. In 1993, the section Tomyrites (interpreted as the subtribe "Tomyrina") was given the replacement name "Ebooina" by C.A.M. Reid, as it was based on a preoccupied genus-group name.

In the Catalog of the leaf beetles of America North of Mexico, published in 2003, Myochroites was placed in synonymy with the section Iphimeites in Eumolpini, while Scelodontites was transferred to Typophorini. Of the genera formerly placed in Myochroites, Glyptoscelis and Myochrous were transferred to Iphimeites in Eumolpini, Colaspidea was transferred to Leprotites, while the placement of the remaining genera was not determined.

== Genera ==
The following genera belong to the tribe Bromiini:

Section Scelodontites:

- Heteraspis Chevrolat in Dejean, 1836 (= Scelodonta Westwood, 1838)
- Pagellia Lefèvre, 1885
- Scelodontina Medvedev, 1979
- Scelolanka Medvedev, 1974
- Syricta Baly, 1865

Section Leprotites:

- Aloria Anonymous, 1940 (= Enneaoria Tan, 1981)
- Andosia Weise, 1896
- Aoria Baly, 1863 (= Osnaparis Fairmaire, 1889 = Pseudaoria Jacoby, 1908)
- †Aoriopsis Moseyko, Kirejtshuk & Nel, 2010
- Aulexis Baly, 1863
- Brevicolaspis Laporte, 1833
- Colaspidea Laporte, 1833
- Crowsonia Monrós, 1952
- Damelia Clark, 1864
- Demotina Baly, 1863
- Epistamena Weise, 1915
- Erythraella Zoia, 2012
- Fidia Motschulsky, 1861 (= Lypesthes Baly, 1863)
- Goniopleura Westwood, 1832
- Hemiplatys Baly, 1863
- Hyperaxis Harold, 1874
- Irenes Chapuis, 1874
- Leprotoides Jacoby, 1896
- Malegia Lefèvre, 1883
- Neculla Baly, 1863
- Neofidia Strother, 2020 (= Fidia Baly, 1863)
- Nephrella Baly, 1863
- Notoxolepra Medvedev, 2004
- Orthaulexis Gressitt, 1945
- Parademotina Bryant & Gressitt, 1957
- Piomera Baly, 1863
- Pseudometaxis Jacoby, 1900
- Stasimus Baly, 1863
- Thootes Jacoby, 1890
- Trichotheca Baly, 1860
- Trichoxantha Medvedev, 1992
- Xanthonia Baly, 1863
- Xanthophorus Jacoby, 1908

Section Trichochryseites:

- Caspiana Lopatin, 1978
- Dermestops Jacobson, 1898
- Eka Maulik, 1931
- Eryxia Baly, 1865
- Lahejia Gahan, 1896
- Parheminodes Chen, 1940
- Parnops Jacobson, 1894
- Trichochrysea Baly, 1861

Section Nerissites:

- Casmena Chapuis, 1874
- Chiridisia Jacoby, 1898
- Dicolectes Lefèvre, 1886
- Lymidus Fairmaire, 1901
- Nerissus Chapuis, 1874
- Uhehlia Weise, 1906

Section Pseudocolaspites:

- Badenis Weise, 1909
- Callipta Lefèvre, 1885
- Cyno Marshall, 1865
- Diconerissus Burgeon, 1941
- Didalsus Fairmaire, 1887
- Echtrusia Lefèvre, 1890
- Endroedymolpus Zoia, 2001
- Ennodius Lefèvre, 1885
- Eurysthenes Lefèvre, 1885
- Macetes Chapuis, 1874
- Macrocoma Chapuis, 1874
- Mesocolaspis Jacoby, 1908
- Monardiella Pic, 1940
- Nerissella Jacoby, 1904
- Pallena Chapuis, 1874
- Pausiris Chapuis, 1874
- Pseudocolaspis Laporte, 1833
- Pseudostola Fairmaire, 1899
- Semmiona Fairmaire, 1885
- Sphaerostola Fairmaire, 1903
- Tanybria Selman, 1963

Section Bromiites:

- Anidania Reitter, 1889
- Bromius Chevrolat in Dejean, 1836

Section Myochroites:

- Acrothinium Marshall, 1865
- Apolepis Baly, 1863
- Aulacolepis Baly, 1863
- Cellomius Lefèvre, 1888
- Chalcosicya Blake, 1930
- Colaspina Weise, 1893
- Damasus Chapuis, 1874
- Dictyneis Baly, 1865
- Eurypelta Lefèvre, 1885
- Heterotrichus Chapuis, 1874
- Lepina Baly, 1863
- Lepinaria Medvedev, 1998 (= Pseudolepis Medvedev & Zoia, 2001)
- Lophea Baly, 1865
- Mecistes Chapuis, 1874
- Neocles Chapuis, 1874
- Neocloides Jacoby, 1898
- Pachnephoptrus Reitter, 1892
- Pachnephorus Chevrolat in Dejean, 1836
- Trichochalcea Baly, 1878

Section Tomyrites (= Subtribe Ebooina):

- Eboo Reid, 1993

Genera not placed in a section:

- Cryocolaspis Flowers, 2004
- †Profidia Gressitt, 1963
- Pseudoxanthus Zoia, 2010

According to BugGuide and ITIS, the genus Graphops has been transferred to the tribe Typophorini, and Glyptoscelis and Myochrous to the tribe Eumolpini. The genus Rhodopaea Gruev & Tomov, 1968 has been transferred to the tribe Floricollini.
