= Dictyneis =

Scientific classification
- Kingdom: Animalia
- Phylum: Arthropoda
- Clade: Pancrustacea
- Class: Insecta
- Order: Coleoptera
- Suborder: Polyphaga
- Infraorder: Cucujiformia
- Family: Chrysomelidae
- Subfamily: Eumolpinae
- Tribe: Bromiini
- Genus: Dictyneis; Baly, 1865

Type species
- (See text)

Synonyms
- Myochrous Blanchard, 1851 (nec Erichson, 1847)

Genus of leaf beetles from Chile

Dictyneis is a genus of leaf beetles in the subfamily Eumolpinae. It is endemic to Chile. It is apterous.

== Taxonomy ==
The original type species designated for Dictyneis was Myochrous pulvinosus Blanchard, 1851. This species was moved to Glyptoscelis by Jerez and Berti (1987), which would automatically make Dictyneis a synonym of Glyptoscelis. However, Jerez (1991) then designated Myochrous asperatus Blanchard, 1851 as the type species, which is considered invalid by Elgueta, Daccordi & Zoia (2017). Despite this, Dictyneis continues to be used, as it is intended that a submission to the ICZN will be made to preserve the name.

== Species ==
- Dictyneis asperatus (Blanchard, 1851)
- Dictyneis brevispinus Jerez, 1991
- Dictyneis campanensis Jerez, 1991
- Dictyneis canaliculatus Jacoby, 1900
- Dictyneis conspurcatus (Blanchard, 1851)
- Dictyneis humilis (Blanchard, 1851)
- Dictyneis parvus Jerez, 1991
- Dictyneis quadridentatus (Philippi & Philippi, 1864)
- Dictyneis terrosus (Philippi & Philippi, 1864)
