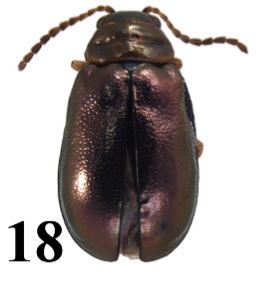

Scientific classification
- Kingdom: Animalia
- Phylum: Arthropoda
- Clade: Pancrustacea
- Class: Insecta
- Order: Coleoptera
- Suborder: Polyphaga
- Infraorder: Cucujiformia
- Family: Chrysomelidae
- Genus: Miraces
- Species: M. aeneipennis

Binomial name
- Miraces aeneipennis Jacoby, 1888

= Miraces aeneipennis =

Species of beetle

Miraces aeneipennis is a species of leaf beetle in the family Chrysomelidae. It is found in Central America and North America.
