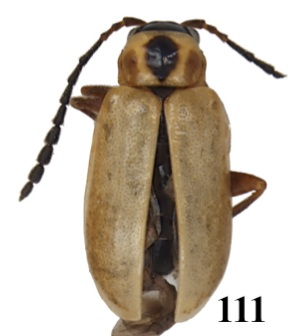
- Luperosoma marginatum

Scientific classification
- Kingdom: Animalia
- Phylum: Arthropoda
- Class: Insecta
- Order: Coleoptera
- Suborder: Polyphaga
- Infraorder: Cucujiformia
- Family: Chrysomelidae
- Tribe: Luperini
- Genus: Luperosoma; Jacoby, 1891

Synonyms
- Deuterobrotica Bechyné, 1958

= Luperosoma =

Genus of beetles

Luperosoma is a genus of leaf beetles in the family Chrysomelidae. They are found in North America and the Neotropics.

== Species ==
The following genera are included in Luperosoma:

1. Luperosoma amplicorne (Baly, 1886)
2. Luperosoma atlanta (Bechyne, 1956)
3. Luperosoma bechynei (Blake, 1966)
4. Luperosoma koepckei (Bechyne & Bechyne, 1962)
5. Luperosoma latifrons (Bechyne, 1958)
6. Luperosoma marginatum Jacoby, 1891
7. Luperosoma nigricolle Blake, 1966
8. Luperosoma nigrum Blake
9. Luperosoma parallelum (Horn, 1893)
10. Luperosoma parvulum (Jacoby, 1888)
11. Luperosoma schwarzi (Horn, 1896)
12. Luperosoma subsulcatum (Horn, 1893)
13. Luperosoma vittatum Blake
