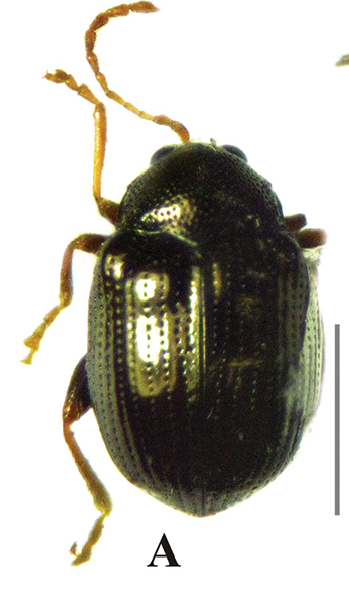
- Acallepitrix

Scientific classification
- Kingdom: Animalia
- Phylum: Arthropoda
- Clade: Pancrustacea
- Class: Insecta
- Order: Coleoptera
- Suborder: Polyphaga
- Infraorder: Cucujiformia
- Family: Chrysomelidae
- Subfamily: Galerucinae
- Tribe: Alticini
- Genus: Acallepitrix; J. Bechyné, 1959

Type species
- Acallepitrix erichsoni (Jacoby, 1902)

= Acallepitrix =

Genus of beetles

Acallepitrix is a genus of flea beetles in the family Chrysomelidae. There are more than 20 described species in Acallepitrix. They are found in the Neotropics, Central America, and North America.

== Species ==
These 59 species belong to the genus Acallepitrix:

- Acallepitrix aegidia Bechyné, 1955
- Acallepitrix affectuosa Bechyné & Bechyné, 1961
- Acallepitrix alvarengai Scherer, 1960
- Acallepitrix angela Bechyné, 1955
- Acallepitrix anila Bechyné & Bechyné, 1963
- Acallepitrix basilepta Bechyné, 1958
- Acallepitrix boliviana Bechyné, 1959
- Acallepitrix brasiliensis Scherer, 1960
- Acallepitrix carinata (Baly, 1879)
- Acallepitrix carinulata Bechyné & Bechyné, 1961
- Acallepitrix castanea (Jacoby, 1885)
- Acallepitrix catharinae (Jacoby, 1905)
- Acallepitrix chaparensis Bechyné, 1959
- Acallepitrix clypeata (Jacoby, 1885)
- Acallepitrix coeruleata (Baly, 1876)
- Acallepitrix collaris (Weise, 1929)
- Acallepitrix constantina Bechyné, 1956
- Acallepitrix coracina (Boheman, 1859)
- Acallepitrix cyanella (Baly, 1876)
- Acallepitrix dissimulans Bechyné, 1970
- Acallepitrix erichsoni (Jacoby, 1902)
- Acallepitrix estebania Bechyné & Bechyné, 1963
- Acallepitrix freyi Bechyné, 1955
- Acallepitrix fulvifrons (Jacoby, 1885)
- Acallepitrix helga Bechyné, 1955
- Acallepitrix heterocera Bechyné, 1957
- Acallepitrix homoplana Bechyné, 1955
- Acallepitrix huallagensis Bechyné, 1959
- Acallepitrix hylophila Bechyné & Bechyné, 1963
- Acallepitrix immetallica Bechyné, 1955
- Acallepitrix inaequalis (Harold, 1877)
- Acallepitrix iris Bechyné & Bechyné, 1963
- Acallepitrix lima Bechyné, 1959
- Acallepitrix mahulena Bechyné, 1956
- Acallepitrix melanoxantha Bechyné, 1956
- Acallepitrix monilicornis Bechyné, 1970
- Acallepitrix morazanica Bechyné & Bechyné, 1963
- Acallepitrix natalensis Scherer, 1960
- Acallepitrix nigerrima Bechyné, 1958
- Acallepitrix nitens (Weise, 1929)
- Acallepitrix orbitalis Bechyné & Bechyné, 1963
- Acallepitrix pachiteensis Bechyné, 1959
- Acallepitrix paciana Bechyné & Bechyné, 1961
- Acallepitrix parahena Bechyné, 1970
- Acallepitrix pellucida Bechyné, 1970
- Acallepitrix persuavis Bechyné & Bechyné, 1963
- Acallepitrix ponderosa Bechyné & Bechyné, 1963
- Acallepitrix punctum Bechyné, 1955
- Acallepitrix raphaela Bechyné, 1955
- Acallepitrix resina Bechyné & Bechyné, 1965
- Acallepitrix rozei Bechyné, 1955
- Acallepitrix rubifrons Bechyné & Bechyné, 1963
- Acallepitrix rufobrunnea Bechyné, 1955
- Acallepitrix scaeva Bechyné, 1955
- Acallepitrix schindleri Bechyné, 1959
- Acallepitrix segregata (Baly, 1876)
- Acallepitrix sulcatipennis Bechyné, 1970
- Acallepitrix wittmeri Bechyné, 1957
- Acallepitrix zulmira Bechyné, 1970
