= Nerissus bicoloratus =

Scientific classification
- Kingdom: Animalia
- Phylum: Arthropoda
- Clade: Pancrustacea
- Class: Insecta
- Order: Coleoptera
- Suborder: Polyphaga
- Infraorder: Cucujiformia
- Family: Chrysomelidae
- Genus: Nerissus
- Species: N. bicoloratus

Binomial name
- Nerissus bicoloratus Jacoby, 1901

Species of beetle

Nerissus bicoloratus is a species of leaf beetle of Senegal and Ivory Coast, described by Martin Jacoby in 1901.
