= Semmiona =

Scientific classification
- Kingdom: Animalia
- Phylum: Arthropoda
- Clade: Pancrustacea
- Class: Insecta
- Order: Coleoptera
- Suborder: Polyphaga
- Infraorder: Cucujiformia
- Family: Chrysomelidae
- Subfamily: Eumolpinae
- Tribe: Bromiini
- Genus: Semmiona; Fairmaire, 1885

Type species
- Semmiona squameoguttata Fairmaire, 1885

Synonyms
- Himera Chapuis, 1874 (nec Duponchel, 1829 nec Robineau-Desvoidy, 1863); Himerida Lefèvre, 1885

Genus of leaf beetles from Africa

Semmiona is a genus of leaf beetles in the subfamily Eumolpinae. It is known from Africa.

== Species ==
- Semmiona chapuisi (Jacoby, 1900)
- Semmiona favareli (Achard, 1914)
- Semmiona squameoguttata Fairmaire, 1885
- Semmiona squamulosa (Chapuis, 1874)
- Semmiona woodi Bryant, 1941
