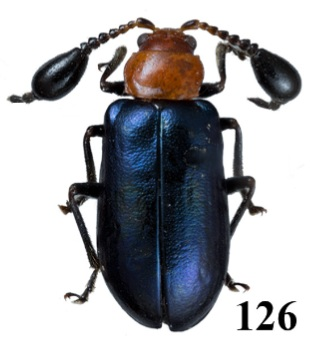
- Metacoryna fulvicollis

Scientific classification
- Kingdom: Animalia
- Phylum: Arthropoda
- Clade: Pancrustacea
- Class: Insecta
- Order: Coleoptera
- Suborder: Polyphaga
- Infraorder: Cucujiformia
- Family: Chrysomelidae
- Tribe: Luperini
- Subtribe: Luperina
- Genus: Metacoryna; Jacoby, 1888

Synonyms
- Cyphotarsis Jacoby, 1892

= Metacoryna =

Genus of leaf beetles

Metacoryna is a genus of beetles belonging to the family Chrysomelidae.

== Species ==
- Metacoryna acobyi Bowditch, 1923
- Metacoryna fulvicollis Jacoby, 1888
- Metacoryna fulvipes Jacoby, 1888
- Metacoryna guatemalensis Jacoby, 1888
- Metacoryna laevipennis Jacoby, 1892
- Metacoryna niger (Jacoby, 1892)
- Metacoryna pretiosa Jacoby, 1892
