= Endroedymolpus =

Scientific classification
- Kingdom: Animalia
- Phylum: Arthropoda
- Clade: Pancrustacea
- Class: Insecta
- Order: Coleoptera
- Suborder: Polyphaga
- Infraorder: Cucujiformia
- Family: Chrysomelidae
- Subfamily: Eumolpinae
- Tribe: Bromiini
- Genus: Endroedymolpus; Zoia, 2001

Type species
- Endroedymolpus taurinus Zoia, 2001

Genus of leaf beetles from South Africa

Endroedymolpus is a genus of leaf beetles in the subfamily Eumolpinae. It is endemic to the Western Cape province of South Africa, its range spanning from Cape Town north to the border with Namibia, and is probably restricted to a fynbos environment. The genus is named in memory of Dr. Sebastian Endrödy-Younga, who collected a large number of the specimens of the genus. It belongs to the tribe Adoxini and is related to the genus Macetes.

== Species ==
- Endroedymolpus peringueyi (Lefèvre, 1890)
- Endroedymolpus smaragdinus Zoia, 2001
- Endroedymolpus taurinus Zoia, 2001
