= Pseudoxanthus =

Scientific classification
- Kingdom: Animalia
- Phylum: Arthropoda
- Clade: Pancrustacea
- Class: Insecta
- Order: Coleoptera
- Suborder: Polyphaga
- Infraorder: Cucujiformia
- Family: Chrysomelidae
- Subfamily: Eumolpinae
- Tribe: Bromiini
- Genus: Pseudoxanthus; Zoia, 2010
- Species: P. snizeki

Binomial name
- Pseudoxanthus snizeki Zoia, 2010

Genus of leaf beetles from Africa

Pseudoxanthus is a genus of leaf beetles in the subfamily Eumolpinae. It contains only one species, Pseudoxanthus snizeki, described by Stefano Zoia in 2010. It is distributed in South Africa.

The generic name is a combination of pseudo- (false) and -xanthus (blonde). The latter is from the second half of "Dermoxanthus", the name of a closely related genus. The species is named after Miroslav Snížek, who collected the majority of the specimens studied.
