= Nerissus =

Scientific classification
- Kingdom: Animalia
- Phylum: Arthropoda
- Clade: Pancrustacea
- Class: Insecta
- Order: Coleoptera
- Suborder: Polyphaga
- Infraorder: Cucujiformia
- Family: Chrysomelidae
- Subfamily: Eumolpinae
- Tribe: Bromiini
- Genus: Nerissus; Chapuis, 1874

Type species
- Nerissus strigosus Chapuis, 1874

Synonyms
- Nerissus Dejean, 1836 (nomen nudum); Neristus Agassiz, 1846; Nerissidius Weise, 1895

Genus of leaf beetles from Africa

Nerissus is a genus of leaf beetles in the subfamily Eumolpinae. It is known from Africa.

== Species ==
- Nerissus affinis Lefèvre, 1889
- Nerissus bicoloratus Jacoby, 1901
- Nerissus carnapi (Kuntzen, 1912)
- Nerissus conformis Weise, 1907
- Nerissus favareli Pic, 1938
- Nerissus femoralis Lefèvre, 1875
- Nerissus gabonensis Jacoby, 1893
- Nerissus globulatus (Kuntzen, 1912)
- Nerissus griseoscutellatus Karsch, 1882
- Nerissus hispidulus Lefèvre, 1886
- Nerissus latepubens Pic, 1939
- Nerissus lefevrei Jacoby, 1895
- Nerissus leucocyclus Kuntzen, 1912
- Nerissus maculosus Pic, 1938
- Nerissus rugosus Bryant, 1956
- Nerissus saegeri Burgeon, 1941
- Nerissus sculptilis (J. Thomson, 1858)
- Nerissus strigosus Chapuis, 1874
- Nerissus tuberculatus Jacoby, 1901
  - Nerissus tuberculatus tuberculatus Jacoby, 1901
  - Nerissus tuberculatus uelensis Burgeon, 1941
- Nerissus uniformis Pic, 1952
- Nerissus viridipennis Jacoby, 1903
