= Aloria (beetle) =

Scientific classification
- Kingdom: Animalia
- Phylum: Arthropoda
- Clade: Pancrustacea
- Class: Insecta
- Order: Coleoptera
- Suborder: Polyphaga
- Infraorder: Cucujiformia
- Family: Chrysomelidae
- Subfamily: Eumolpinae
- Tribe: Bromiini
- Genus: Aloria; Anonymous, 1940

Type species
- Aloria purpurea Bryant, 1939

Synonyms
- Aloria Bryant, 1939 (unavailable name); Enneaoria Tan, 1981

Genus of leaf beetles

Aloria is a genus of leaf beetles in the subfamily Eumolpinae. It is distributed in India, Myanmar and southwestern China. It is similar to the genus Aoria, but differs from it by its antennae: Aoria has 11-segmented antennae, while Aloria has nine-segmented antennae.

The genus was first proposed with two included species by Gilbert Ernest Bryant in 1939, but without a designated type species, making the genus name unavailable in zoology according to the International Code of Zoological Nomenclature. Aloria instead becomes an available name with anonymous authorship from The Zoological Record in 1940, which cited it as a genus including only the species Aloria purpurea, which becomes the type species by monotypy. In 2012, L. N. Medvedev proposed that the genus Enneaoria (described from Yunnan, China) is a junior synonym of Aloria.

== Species ==
The genus includes three species:

- Aloria caerulea (Jacoby, 1908) – West Bengal (Darjeeling), Manipur, Myanmar
- Aloria purpurea Bryant, 1939
- Aloria yunnanensis (Tan, 1981) – Yunnan
