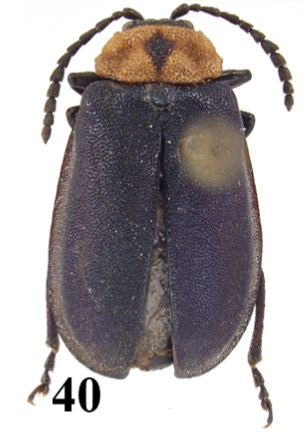
- Ophraea rugosa

Scientific classification
- Kingdom: Animalia
- Phylum: Arthropoda
- Clade: Pancrustacea
- Class: Insecta
- Order: Coleoptera
- Suborder: Polyphaga
- Infraorder: Cucujiformia
- Family: Chrysomelidae
- Tribe: Galerucini
- Genus: Ophraea; Jacoby, 1886

= Ophraea =

Genus of beetles

Ophraea is a genus of skeletonizing leaf beetles in the family Chrysomelidae. There are about eight described species in Ophraea. They are found in North America and the Neotropics.

== Species ==
These species belong to the genus Ophraea:

- Ophraea acuticollis Bechyne, 1950
- Ophraea aenea Jacoby, 1886
- Ophraea elongata Jacoby, 1886
- Ophraea maculicollis Blake, 1953
- Ophraea majalis Bechyne, 1950
- Ophraea melancholica Jacoby, 1886
- Ophraea metallica Jacoby, 1886
- Ophraea minor Jacoby, 1886
- Ophraea obtusicollis Bechyne, 1950
- Ophraea opaca Jacoby, 1892
- Ophraea rugosa (Jacoby, 1886)
- Ophraea subcostata Jacoby, 1886
