= Miraces =

Scientific classification
- Kingdom: Animalia
- Phylum: Arthropoda
- Clade: Pancrustacea
- Class: Insecta
- Order: Coleoptera
- Suborder: Polyphaga
- Infraorder: Cucujiformia
- Family: Chrysomelidae
- Tribe: Galerucini
- Genus: Miraces; Jacoby, 1888

Synonyms
- Halticidea Horn, 1893

Genus of beetles

Miraces is a genus of skeletonizing leaf beetles in the family Chrysomelidae. There are six described species in Miraces. They are found in North America and the Neotropics.

== Species ==
These six species belong to the genus Miraces:

- Miraces aeneipennis Jacoby, 1888
- Miraces barberi (Blake, 1951)
- Miraces dichroa (Suffrian, 1868)
- Miraces glaber (Blake, 1946}
- Miraces modesta (Horn, 1893)
- Miraces placida (Horn, 1893)
