= Euphrytus intermedius =

Scientific classification
- Kingdom: Animalia
- Phylum: Arthropoda
- Clade: Pancrustacea
- Class: Insecta
- Order: Coleoptera
- Suborder: Polyphaga
- Infraorder: Cucujiformia
- Family: Chrysomelidae
- Genus: Euphrytus
- Species: E. intermedius

Binomial name
- Euphrytus intermedius Jacoby, 1890

Species of beetle

Euphrytus intermedius is a species of leaf beetle. It is found in Mexico and Arizona.
