= Parnops =

Scientific classification
- Kingdom: Animalia
- Phylum: Arthropoda
- Clade: Pancrustacea
- Class: Insecta
- Order: Coleoptera
- Suborder: Polyphaga
- Infraorder: Cucujiformia
- Family: Chrysomelidae
- Subfamily: Eumolpinae
- Tribe: Bromiini
- Genus: Parnops; Jacobson, 1894

Type species
- Parnops glasunowi Jacobson, 1894

Genus of leaf beetles from Asia

Parnops is a genus of leaf beetles in the subfamily Eumolpinae. It contains four species, which are distributed in the southern part of Central Asia and in Iran, Mongolia and northern China.

== Species ==
- Parnops atriceps Pic, 1903 – China (Xinjiang)
- Parnops glasunowi Jacobson, 1894
  - Parnops glasunowi ferghanicus Lopatin, 1976 – Kyrgyzstan
  - Parnops glasunowi glasunowi Jacobson, 1894 – China (Gansu, Hebei, Liaoning, Inner Mongolia, Shaanxi, Shanxi, Xinjiang), Iran, Tajikistan, Turkmenistan, Uzbekistan
- Parnops ordossana Jacobson, 1910 – China (Inner Mongolia)
- Parnops vaillanti Pic, 1945 – China (Xinjiang)

== Host plants ==
Parnops has been reported on plants of the genera Pyrus, Salix and Populus.
