= Erythraella =

Scientific classification
- Kingdom: Animalia
- Phylum: Arthropoda
- Clade: Pancrustacea
- Class: Insecta
- Order: Coleoptera
- Suborder: Polyphaga
- Infraorder: Cucujiformia
- Family: Chrysomelidae
- Subfamily: Eumolpinae
- Tribe: Bromiini
- Genus: Erythraella; Zoia, 2012
- Species: E. bicuspidata

Binomial name
- Erythraella bicuspidata Zoia, 2012

Genus of leaf beetles from Yemen

Erythraella is a genus of leaf beetles in the subfamily Eumolpinae. It contains only one species, Erythraella bicuspidata, which is endemic to Socotra. The genus and species were described by Stefano Zoia in 2012. The genus name comes from the Latin name for the Arabian Sea, "mare Erythraeum". The species name, meaning "double pointed" in Latin, refers to the double point of the apex of the aedeagus. The genus is related to Lypesthes and Trichotheca.
