= Ensiforma =

Scientific classification
- Kingdom: Animalia
- Phylum: Arthropoda
- Clade: Pancrustacea
- Class: Insecta
- Order: Coleoptera
- Suborder: Polyphaga
- Infraorder: Cucujiformia
- Family: Chrysomelidae
- Subfamily: Galerucinae
- Tribe: Luperini
- Subtribe: Diabroticina
- Genus: Ensiforma; Jacoby, 1876

Genus of beetle

Ensiforma is a genus of leaf beetles. The scientific name of the genus was first published in 1876.

== Species ==
- Ensiforma aeropaga (Bechyne, 1956)
- Ensiforma asteria (Bechyne & Bechyne, 1962)
- Ensiforma caerulea (Jacoby, 1876)
- Ensiforma chiquitoensis (Bechyne, 1958)
- Ensiforma complexicornis (Bechyne, 1956)
- Ensiforma dianeira (Bechyne & Bechyne, 1962)
- Ensiforma inflaticornis (Bechyne, 1956)
- Ensiforma melancholica (Baly, 1889)
- Ensiforma muriensis (Bechyne, 1956)
