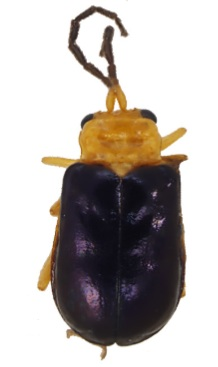

Scientific classification
- Kingdom: Animalia
- Phylum: Arthropoda
- Clade: Pancrustacea
- Class: Insecta
- Order: Coleoptera
- Suborder: Polyphaga
- Infraorder: Cucujiformia
- Family: Chrysomelidae
- Tribe: Luperini
- Subtribe: Diabroticina
- Genus: Oroetes; Jacoby, 1888

= Oroetes (beetle) =

Genus of leaf beetles

Oroetes is a genus of beetles belonging to the family Chrysomelidae.

== Species ==
- Oroetes flavicollis Jacoby, 1888
- Oroetes huastecus
- Oroetes juchiltepensis
- Oroetes wilcoxi Blake, 1966
