= Pseudometaxis =

Scientific classification
- Kingdom: Animalia
- Phylum: Arthropoda
- Clade: Pancrustacea
- Class: Insecta
- Order: Coleoptera
- Suborder: Polyphaga
- Infraorder: Cucujiformia
- Family: Chrysomelidae
- Subfamily: Eumolpinae
- Tribe: Bromiini
- Genus: Pseudometaxis; Jacoby, 1900

Type species
- Pseudometaxis serraticollis (= Pseudometaxis serratithorax Chen, 1940) Jacoby, 1900 (nec Baly, 1867)

Genus of leaf beetles from Asia

Pseudometaxis is a genus of leaf beetles in the subfamily Eumolpinae. It is distributed in Southeast Asia and Southern China.

== Species ==
The genus contains at least five species:

- Pseudometaxis minutus Pic, 1923 – China (Yunnan)
- Pseudometaxis rufescens Pic, 1927 – Sumatra
- Pseudometaxis serraticollis (Baly, 1867) – Myanmar, Thailand, Vietnam, Peninsular Malaysia, Sumatra
- Pseudometaxis serratithorax Chen, 1940 – Myanmar
- Pseudometaxis tonkineus Pic, 1924 – Thailand, Vietnam

Synonyms:

- Pseudometaxis hirsutus Pic, 1928: synonym of Pseudometaxis tonkineus Pic, 1924
- Pseudometaxis maculatus Chûjô, 1964: synonym of Pseudometaxis serraticollis (Baly, 1867)
- Pseudometaxis nanus Chen, 1940: synonym of Fidia submaculata (Pic, 1924)
- Pseudometaxis serraticollis Jacoby, 1900 (nec Baly, 1867): renamed to Pseudometaxis serratithorax Chen, 1940
- Pseudometaxis submaculatus (Pic, 1924): moved to Fidia
