= Euphrytus =

Scientific classification
- Kingdom: Animalia
- Phylum: Arthropoda
- Clade: Pancrustacea
- Class: Insecta
- Order: Coleoptera
- Suborder: Polyphaga
- Infraorder: Cucujiformia
- Family: Chrysomelidae
- Subfamily: Eumolpinae
- Tribe: Eumolpini
- Genus: Euphrytus; Jacoby, 1881

Type species
- Euphrytus aeneus Jacoby, 1881

Genus of leaf beetles

Euphrytus is a genus of leaf beetles in the subfamily Eumolpinae. There are 29 described species in Euphrytus from Central and North America, three of which are found north of Mexico.

== Species ==
These species belong to the genus Euphrytus:

- Euphrytus aeneus Jacoby, 1881
- Euphrytus apicicornis Jacoby, 1890
- Euphrytus costatus (Jacoby, 1890)
- Euphrytus crassipes Bechyné, 1957
- Euphrytus elongatus Jacoby, 1890
- Euphrytus fulvicollis Jacoby, 1881
- Euphrytus fulvicornis Jacoby, 1890
- Euphrytus fulvipes (Jacoby, 1881)
- Euphrytus ghilianii Bechyné, 1957
- Euphrytus huehuetenangensis Bechyné, 1953
- Euphrytus humeralis Jacoby, 1890
- Euphrytus intermedius Jacoby, 1890^{i c g b}
- Euphrytus micans Bechyné, 1957
- Euphrytus montivagus Bechyné, 1953
- Euphrytus nigritarsis Jacoby, 1890
- Euphrytus omisus Bechyné, 1954
- Euphrytus opacicollis Jacoby, 1881
- Euphrytus pallidus Jacoby, 1890
- Euphrytus pallipes Jacoby, 1890
- Euphrytus parvicollis Schaeffer, 1933^{i c g b}
- Euphrytus rugipennis (Jacoby, 1881)
- Euphrytus rugosus Jacoby, 1890
- Euphrytus semirugosus Jacoby, 1890
- Euphrytus simplex Jacoby, 1881
- Euphrytus snowi Schaeffer, 1933^{b}
- Euphrytus surrubrensis Bechyné, 1957
- Euphrytus tenuipes Bechyné, 1957
- Euphrytus umbrosus Jacoby, 1890
- Euphrytus varicornis Jacoby, 1890

Data sources: i = ITIS, c = Catalogue of Life, g = GBIF, b = Bugguide.net

Synonyms:

- Euphrytus varipennis Jacoby, 1890: synonym of Therses nigricollis Jacoby, 1890
