= Aoriopsis =

Aoriopsis Temporal range: Ypresian

Scientific classification
- Kingdom: Animalia
- Phylum: Arthropoda
- Clade: Pancrustacea
- Class: Insecta
- Order: Coleoptera
- Suborder: Polyphaga
- Infraorder: Cucujiformia
- Family: Chrysomelidae
- Subfamily: Eumolpinae
- Tribe: Bromiini
- Genus: †Aoriopsis; Moseyko, Kirejtshuk & Nel, 2010
- Species: †A. eocenicus

Binomial name
- †Aoriopsis eocenicus Moseyko, Kirejtshuk & Nel, 2010

Extinct genus of leaf beetles

Aoriopsis is an extinct genus of leaf beetles in the subfamily Eumolpinae. It contains only one species, Aoriopsis eocenicus, and is known only from lowermost Eocene amber collected from Le Quesnoy, Oise Department, France.

The species is known only from one fossil, the holotype, specimen number "PA 2437". It is an almost complete female beetle included in a small piece of amber. The specimen is currently deposited at the Muséum national d'histoire naturelle in Paris, France. Aoriopsis was first studied by Alexey G. Moseyko and Alexander G. Kirejtshuk of the Zoological Institute of the Russian Academy of Sciences and Andre Nel of the Muséum national d'histoire naturelle. Their type description of the genus was published in the journal Annales de la Société Entomologique de France in 2010.

The generic name, Aoriopsis, is a combination of the generic name Aoria and the Greek root opsis (appearance, countenance, face). The specific name, eocenicus, is derived from "Eocene", the geological epoch the genus lived in.
