= Xanthophorus =

Scientific classification
- Kingdom: Animalia
- Phylum: Arthropoda
- Clade: Pancrustacea
- Class: Insecta
- Order: Coleoptera
- Suborder: Polyphaga
- Infraorder: Cucujiformia
- Family: Chrysomelidae
- Subfamily: Eumolpinae
- Tribe: Bromiini
- Genus: Xanthophorus; Jacoby, 1908

Type species
- Xanthonia flavopilosa Jacoby, 1887

Genus of leaf beetles from Asia

Xanthophorus is a genus of leaf beetles in the subfamily Eumolpinae. It is distributed in South Asia.

== Species ==
- Xanthophorus andrewesi (Jacoby, 1903) – Southern India (Nilgiris)
- Xanthophorus balyi (Jacoby, 1903) – Southern India (Nilgiris, Anaimalais)
- Xanthophorus carinatus Jacoby, 1908 – Southern India (Nilgiris, Travancore)
- Xanthophorus flavopilosus (Jacoby, 1887) – Sri Lanka
- Xanthophorus fulvicollis Bryant, 1954
- Xanthophorus fuscipennis Jacoby, 1908 – Sri Lanka
- Xanthophorus laevicollis Jacoby, 1908 – Southern India (Tiruchirappalli)
- Xanthophorus lemoides (Walker, 1858) – Sri Lanka
- Xanthophorus montanus Jacoby, 1908 – Southern India (Nilgiris)
- Xanthophorus nepalicus Medvedev & Sprecher-Uebersax, 1999 – Nepal
- Xanthophorus nigricollis Jacoby, 1908 – Southern India (Shembaganur)
- Xanthophorus nigripennis (Jacoby, 1900) – Bengal (Mandar)
- Xanthophorus pallidus (Jacoby, 1903) – Southern India (Nilgiris)
- Xanthophorus seriatus Weise, 1922 – East India (Darjeeling)
