= Hyperaxis =

Scientific classification
- Kingdom: Animalia
- Phylum: Arthropoda
- Clade: Pancrustacea
- Class: Insecta
- Order: Coleoptera
- Suborder: Polyphaga
- Infraorder: Cucujiformia
- Family: Chrysomelidae
- Subfamily: Eumolpinae
- Tribe: Bromiini
- Genus: Hyperaxis; Harold, 1874

Type species
- Metaxis sellata Baly, 1863

Synonyms
- Metaxis Baly, 1863 (nec Chaudoir, 1850); Pseudopiomera Jacoby, 1892

Genus of leaf beetles from Asia

Hyperaxis is a genus of leaf beetles in the subfamily Eumolpinae. It is distributed in East, South and Southeast Asia.

== Species ==
Species in Hyperaxis include:

- Hyperaxis albostriata (Motschulsky, 1866) – Sri Lanka
- Hyperaxis ariyani Chûjô, 1964 – Thailand
- Hyperaxis balyi (Jacoby, 1889) – Myanmar
- Hyperaxis buonloica Moseyko & Medvedev, 2017 – Vietnam
  - Hyperaxis buonloica buonloica Moseyko & Medvedev, 2017
  - Hyperaxis buonloica darlaki Moseyko & Medvedev, 2017
- Hyperaxis dentifemur Moseyko & Medvedev, 2017 – Vietnam
- Hyperaxis distincta Duvivier, 1892 – Bengal
- Hyperaxis dubia Jacoby, 1908 – Southern India
- Hyperaxis feae Jacoby, 1904 – Myanmar, Thailand, Vietnam
- Hyperaxis foveolata Jacoby, 1908 – Southern India
- Hyperaxis fulvohirsuta (Jacoby, 1904) – Southern India
- Hyperaxis grisea Jacoby, 1908 – Southern India
- Hyperaxis harmandi Lefèvre, 1893 – Vietnam
- Hyperaxis longipilosa Moseyko & Medvedev, 2017 – Vietnam
- Hyperaxis maculata Kimoto & Gressitt, 1982 – Vietnam, Laos
- Hyperaxis malabarica Jacoby, 1908 – Southern India
- Hyperaxis mandarensis Jacoby, 1908 – Bengal
- Hyperaxis nigra (Chen, 1935) – Southwestern China (Guizhou)
- Hyperaxis nigrescens (Chûjô, 1956) – Taiwan
- Hyperaxis nigrita (Eroshkina, 1992) – Vietnam, Thailand
- Hyperaxis pallidicornis (Jacoby, 1892) – Myanmar
- Hyperaxis pallidipes (Pic, 1929) – Vietnam
- Hyperaxis penicillata Jacoby, 1908 – Southern India
- Hyperaxis phanrangi Moseyko & Medvedev, 2017 – Vietnam
- Hyperaxis phuquocnia Dinh, 2022 – Vietnam
- Hyperaxis quadraticollis Jacoby, 1908 – Andaman Islands
- Hyperaxis scutellata (Baly, 1863) – China?
- Hyperaxis sellata (Baly, 1863) – Borneo (Sarawak)
- Hyperaxis sonlanga Moseyko & Medvedev, 2017 – Vietnam
- Hyperaxis tanongchiti Kimoto & Gressitt, 1982 – Thailand
- Hyperaxis variegata Jacoby, 1904 – Southern India
- Hyperaxis yaosanica Chen, 1940 – China, Vietnam

The following species were described for the genus Pseudopiomera, but have not been moved to Hyperaxis (?):

- Pseudopiomera andrewesi Jacoby, 1908 – Southern India
- Pseudopiomera ceylonensis Jacoby, 1908 – Sri Lanka

The following are synonyms of other species:

- Hyperaxis consors Chen, 1940: synonym of Hyperaxis yaosanica Chen, 1940
- Hyperaxis duvivieri (Jacoby, 1904): synonym of Trichotheca hirta Baly, 1860
- Hyperaxis robustus (Pic, 1929): synonym of Demotina inhirsuta (Pic, 1923)
- Hyperaxis semifasciata (Jacoby, 1887): synonym of Hyperaxis albostriata (Motschulsky, 1866)
