= Nerissus tuberculatus =

Scientific classification
- Kingdom: Animalia
- Phylum: Arthropoda
- Clade: Pancrustacea
- Class: Insecta
- Order: Coleoptera
- Suborder: Polyphaga
- Infraorder: Cucujiformia
- Family: Chrysomelidae
- Genus: Nerissus
- Species: N. tuberculatus

Binomial name
- Nerissus tuberculatus Jacoby, 1901

Species of leaf beetle

Nerissus tuberculatus is a species of leaf beetle from Cameroon and the Democratic Republic of the Congo. It was first described by Martin Jacoby in 1901.

== Subspecies ==
There are two subspecies of N. tuberculatus:

- Nerissus tuberculatus tuberculatus Jacoby, 1901: The nominotypical subspecies. Found in Cameroon.
- Nerissus tuberculatus uelensis Burgeon, 1941: Found in the Democratic Republic of the Congo.
