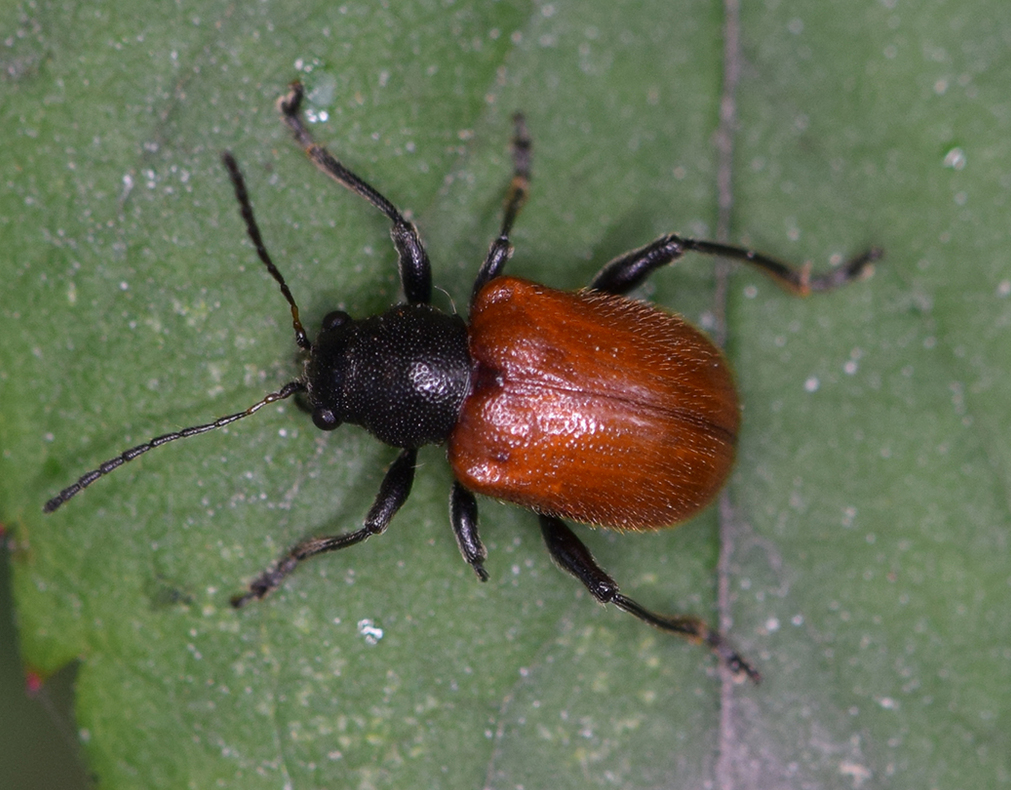
- Aoria scutellaris, South Korea

Scientific classification
- Kingdom: Animalia
- Phylum: Arthropoda
- Clade: Pancrustacea
- Class: Insecta
- Order: Coleoptera
- Suborder: Polyphaga
- Infraorder: Cucujiformia
- Family: Chrysomelidae
- Subfamily: Eumolpinae
- Tribe: Bromiini
- Genus: Aoria; Baly, 1863

Type species
- Adoxus nigripes Baly, 1860

Synonyms
- Pseudaoriana Pic, 1930

= Aoria (beetle) =

Genus of leaf beetles from Asia

Aoria is a genus of leaf beetles in the subfamily Eumolpinae. Members of the genus are distributed in East and Southeast Asia. Food plants are known for only a few species, all of which were recorded from Vitaceae.

The genus is divided into three subgenera: Aoria, Osnaparis and Pseudaoria, the latter two formerly being considered genera in their own right. Aloria is similar to the genus Aloria (including former genus Enneaoria), but differs from it by its antennae: Aoria has 11-segmented antennae, while Aloria has nine-segmented antennae.

== Species ==
Subgenus Aoria Baly, 1863

- Aoria annulipes Pic, 1935 – China
- Aoria antennata Chen, 1940 – East China (Zhejiang, Jiangxi)
- Aoria atra Pic, 1923 – Southwest China (Yunnan), North Vietnam
- Aoria bicoloripes Pic, 1935 – Vietnam
- Aoria bowringii (Baly, 1860) – South China, Indochina, Taiwan, India, Myanmar, Malay Peninsula, Borneo
- Aoria brancuccii Medvedev, 2012 – North India
- Aoria carinata Tan, 1993 – Central China (Hunan)
- Aoria costata Tan, 1992 – Central China (Hunan)
- Aoria cuprea Medvedev, 2012 – Southwest China (Sichuan, Yunnan)
- Aoria cyanea Chen, 1940 – Northwest China (Gansu)
- Aoria fulva Medvedev, 2012 – North China (Shanxi)
- Aoria fulvula Medvedev, 2012 – North Vietnam
- Aoria gracilicornis Chen, 1940 – East China (Shandong)
- Aoria heinzi Medvedev, 2012 – Southwest China (Sichuan)
- Aoria humeralis Medvedev, 2019 – North Vietnam
- Aoria marginipennis Medvedev, 2012 – Southwest China (Sichuan)
- Aoria martensi Medvedev, 2012 – Northwest China (Shaanxi)
- Aoria nepalica Medvedev & Sprecher-Uebersax, 1997 – Nepal
- Aoria nigripennis Gressitt & Kimoto, 1961 – South China: (Fujian, Guangdong, Guangxi)
- Aoria nigripes (Baly, 1860) – South China, Vietnam, Laos, Cambodia, Thailand, Myanmar, India, Nepal, Taiwan, Malay Peninsula, Sumatra
- Aoria nigromarginata Medvedev, 2012 – South China (Fujian)
- Aoria panfilovi Medvedev, 2012 – Southwest China (Sichuan)
- Aoria rufotestacea Fairmaire, 1889 – South China (Xikang, Guizhou, Hubei, Jiangsu, Zhejiang)
- Aoria scutellaris Pic, 1923
  - Aoria scutellaris rufipennis Pic, 1923 – Southwest China (North Sichuan)
  - Aoria scutellaris scutellaris Pic, 1923 – South-east China, west to Sichuan, north and central Vietnam
- Aoria semicostata Jacoby, 1892
- Aoria thibetana Pic, 1928 – West China (Tibet, Yunnan)
- Aoria vietnamica Medvedev, 2012 – North Vietnam

Subgenus Osnaparis Fairmaire, 1889

- Aoria laosica Medvedev, 2012 – Laos
- Aoria lushuiensis Tan, 1992 – Southwest China (Yunnan)
- Aoria montana Tan, 1992 – Southwest China (Sichuan)
- Aoria nucea (Fairmaire, 1889) – China (Xikang, Sichuan, Hubei, Jiangxi, Hebei), North Vietnam, Japan, Taiwan
- Aoria pallidipennis Pic, 1928 – North Vietnam, Taiwan, Thailand

Subgenus Pseudaoria Jacoby, 1908

- Aoria burmanica (Jacoby, 1908) – India (Manipur), Myanmar
- Aoria floccosa (Tan, 1992) – Southwest China (Hengduan Mountains)
- Aoria irregularis (Tan, 1992) – Southwest China (Sichuan)
- Aoria petri (Warchałowski, 2010) – Southwest China (Sichuan)
- Aoria rufina (Gressitt & Kimoto, 1961) – Southwest China (Sichuan)
- Aoria yunnana (Tan, 1992) – Southwest China (Yunnan)
