= Neobrotica =

Scientific classification
- Kingdom: Animalia
- Phylum: Arthropoda
- Clade: Pancrustacea
- Class: Insecta
- Order: Coleoptera
- Suborder: Polyphaga
- Infraorder: Cucujiformia
- Family: Chrysomelidae
- Tribe: Luperini
- Subtribe: Diabroticina
- Genus: Neobrotica; Jacoby, 1887

Genus of leaf beetles

Neobrotica is a genus of beetles belonging to the family Chrysomelidae.

== Species ==
- Neobrotica caeruleofasciata Jacoby, 1887
- Neobrotica caeruleolineata Jacoby, 1887
- Neobrotica cartwrighti Blake, 1966
- Neobrotica colombiensis Blake, 1966
- Neobrotica comma Bechyne, 1956
- Neobrotica confusa Blake, 1966
- Neobrotica decemsignata Blake, 1966
- Neobrotica dentata Blake, 1966
- Neobrotica dimidiaticornis Jacoby, 1889
- Neobrotica duodecimsignata (Baly, 1889)
- Neobrotica duplicata Wilcox, 1889
- Neobrotica erythrinae Bechyne, 1958
- Neobrotica flavipes Blake, 1966
- Neobrotica flavolimbata Blake, 1966
- Neobrotica germaini Blake, 1966
- Neobrotica grandis Blake, 1966
- Neobrotica hepatica Bechyne, 1958
- Neobrotica hondurensis Jacoby, 1887
- Neobrotica imitans Jacoby, 1887
- Neobrotica inconspicua Jacoby, 1887
- Neobrotica inconstans Jacoby, 1889
- Neobrotica instabilis (Harold, 1877)
- Neobrotica linigera Jacoby, 1887
- Neobrotica ludicra Bechyne, 1958
- Neobrotica martina (Bechyne, 1956)
- Neobrotica matamorasensis Blake, 1966
- Neobrotica melanocephala Jacoby, 1887
- Neobrotica meridensis Blake, 1966
- Neobrotica modesta Jacoby, 1887
- Neobrotica noumenia Blake, 1966
- Neobrotica oberthrui (Baly, 1886)
- Neobrotica octosignata Blake, 1966
- Neobrotica ornata Jacoby, 1887
- Neobrotica pallescens Jacoby, 1887
- Neobrotica pentaspilota Blake, 1966
- Neobrotica piceofasciata Blake, 1966
- Neobrotica piceolineata (Baly, 1886)
- Neobrotica pluristicta (Fall, 1910)
- Neobrotica poecila Blake, 1966
- Neobrotica praeclara (Weise, 1929)
- Neobrotica pterota Blake, 1966
- Neobrotica punctatissima Jacoby, 1887
- Neobrotica quadrimaculata Blake, 1966
- Neobrotica quadriplagiata Jacoby, 1887
- Neobrotica quinquepunctata (Jacoby, 1887)
- Neobrotica regularis Blake, 1966
- Neobrotica rendalli Blake, 1966
- Neobrotica rogaguaensis Blake, 1966
- Neobrotica ruficollis Blake, 1966
- Neobrotica schausi Blake, 1966
- Neobrotica semicostata Jacoby, 1887
- Neobrotica septemmaculata (Blake, 1966)
- Neobrotica sexmaculata Jacoby, 1887
- Neobrotica simulans Jacoby, 1887
- Neobrotica spilocephala Blake, 1966
- Neobrotica stalagma Blake, 1966
- Neobrotica tampicensis Blake, 1966
- Neobrotica trichops Blake, 1966
- Neobrotica undecimmaculata Jacoby, 1887
- Neobrotica variabilis Jacoby, 1887
- Neobrotica zonata Blake, 1966
