= Dermestops =

Scientific classification
- Kingdom: Animalia
- Phylum: Arthropoda
- Clade: Pancrustacea
- Class: Insecta
- Order: Coleoptera
- Suborder: Polyphaga
- Infraorder: Cucujiformia
- Family: Chrysomelidae
- Subfamily: Eumolpinae
- Tribe: Bromiini
- Genus: Dermestops; Jacobson, 1898
- Species: D. ahngeri

Binomial name
- Dermestops ahngeri Jacobson, 1898

Synonyms
- Genus: Allecumolpus Medvedev, 1956; Species: Allecumolpus smirnovi Medvedev, 1956

Genus of leaf beetles from Central Asia

Dermestops is a genus of leaf beetles in the subfamily Eumolpinae. It contains only one species, Dermestops ahngeri, which is distributed in Turkmenistan.
