= Pteleon (beetle) =

Scientific classification
- Kingdom: Animalia
- Phylum: Arthropoda
- Clade: Pancrustacea
- Class: Insecta
- Order: Coleoptera
- Suborder: Polyphaga
- Infraorder: Cucujiformia
- Family: Chrysomelidae
- Subfamily: Galerucinae
- Tribe: Luperini
- Subtribe: Luperina
- Genus: Pteleon; Jacoby, 1888

Genus of beetles

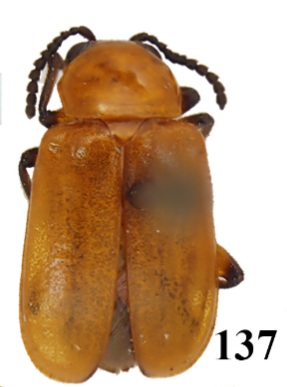
Pteleon brevicornis

Pteleon is a genus of leaf beetles in the family Chrysomelidae. There are three described species in Pteleon.

== Species ==
These species belong to the genus Pteleon:

- Pteleon brevicornis (Jacoby, 1887)
- Pteleon pubescens Jacoby, 1892
- Pteleon semicaeruleus Jacoby, 1888
