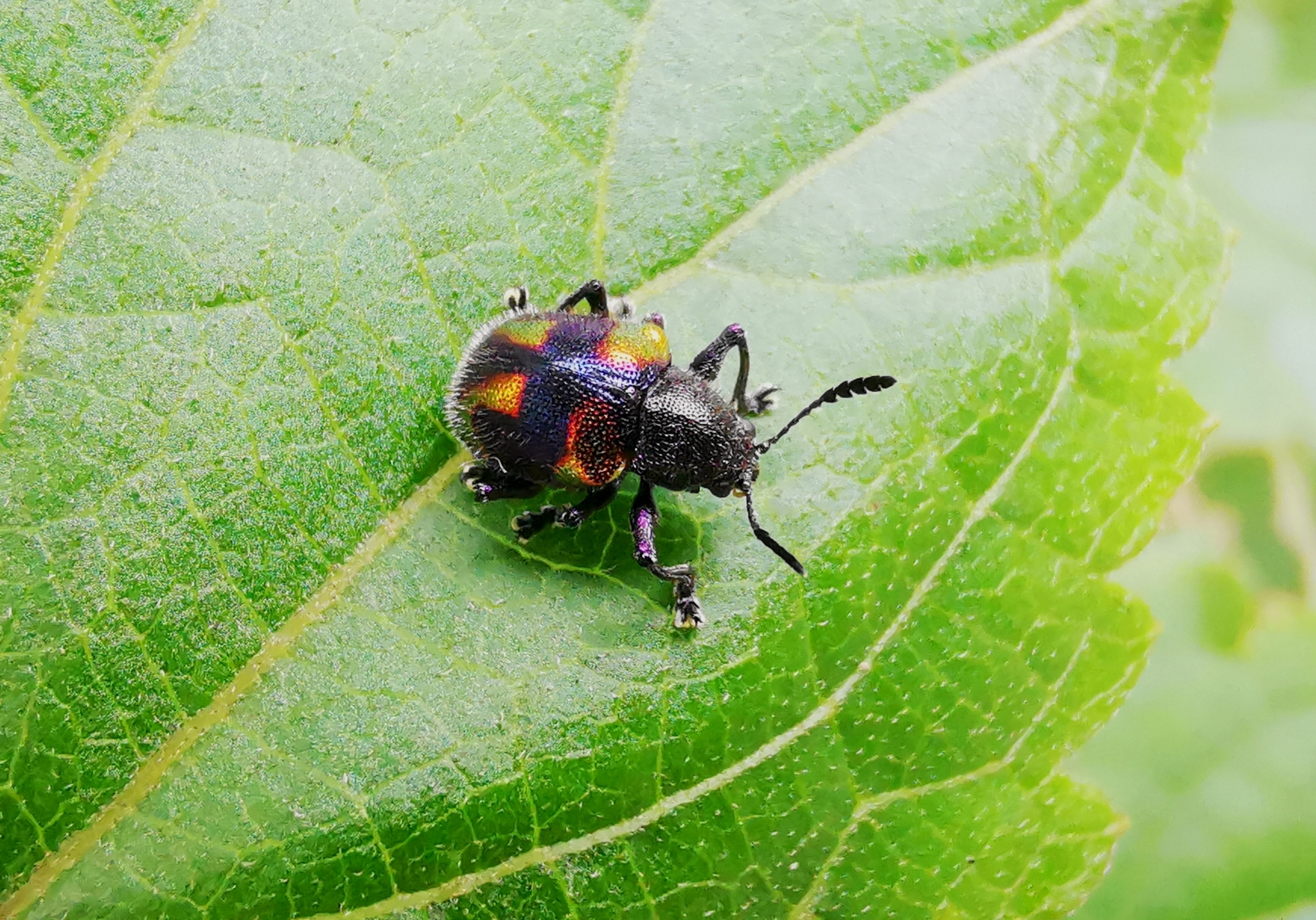
- Heterotrichus balyi, Thailand

Scientific classification
- Kingdom: Animalia
- Phylum: Arthropoda
- Clade: Pancrustacea
- Class: Insecta
- Order: Coleoptera
- Suborder: Polyphaga
- Infraorder: Cucujiformia
- Family: Chrysomelidae
- Subfamily: Eumolpinae
- Tribe: Bromiini
- Genus: Heterotrichus; Chapuis, 1874

Type species
- Heterotrichus balyi Chapuis, 1874

= Heterotrichus =

Genus of leaf beetles from Asia

Heterotrichus is a genus of leaf beetles in the subfamily Eumolpinae. It is distributed in mainland Southeast Asia and Yunnan province in Southwestern China.

== Species ==
The genus includes two species:

- Heterotrichus balyi Chapuis, 1874 – Yunnan (Xishuangbanna), Myanmar, Thailand, Laos, Vietnam
- Heterotrichus hirsutus (Tan & Wang, 2005) – Yunnan (Xishuangbanna)

Synonyms:

- Heterotrichus violaceus (Jacoby, 1889): synonym of Heterotrichus balyi Chapuis, 1874
