= Semmiona squameoguttata =

Scientific classification
- Kingdom: Animalia
- Phylum: Arthropoda
- Clade: Pancrustacea
- Class: Insecta
- Order: Coleoptera
- Suborder: Polyphaga
- Infraorder: Cucujiformia
- Family: Chrysomelidae
- Genus: Semmiona
- Species: S. squameoguttata

Binomial name
- Semmiona squameoguttata Fairmaire, 1885

Synonyms
- Himerida clavareaui Jacoby, 1901

Species of beetle

Semmiona squameoguttata is a species of leaf beetle of the Democratic Republic of the Congo, described by Léon Fairmaire in 1885.
