= Cyno mordicans =

Scientific classification
- Kingdom: Animalia
- Phylum: Arthropoda
- Clade: Pancrustacea
- Class: Insecta
- Order: Coleoptera
- Suborder: Polyphaga
- Infraorder: Cucujiformia
- Family: Chrysomelidae
- Subfamily: Eumolpinae
- Tribe: Bromiini
- Genus: Cyno; Marshall, 1865
- Species: C. mordicans

Binomial name
- Cyno mordicans Marshall, 1865

Species of leaf beetle from South Africa

Cyno mordicans is a species of leaf beetle endemic to South Africa, and the only member of the genus Cyno. It was first described by the English entomologist Thomas Ansell Marshall in 1865.
