= Diconerissus =

Scientific classification
- Kingdom: Animalia
- Phylum: Arthropoda
- Clade: Pancrustacea
- Class: Insecta
- Order: Coleoptera
- Suborder: Polyphaga
- Infraorder: Cucujiformia
- Family: Chrysomelidae
- Subfamily: Eumolpinae
- Tribe: Bromiini
- Genus: Diconerissus; Burgeon, 1941
- Species: D. lepersonneae

Binomial name
- Diconerissus lepersonneae Burgeon, 1941

Genus of leaf beetles

Diconerissus is a genus of leaf beetles in the subfamily Eumolpinae. It contains only one species, Diconerissus lepersonneae, found in the Democratic Republic of the Congo. It was first described by the Belgian entomologist Louis Burgeon in 1941.
