= Eboo =

Scientific classification
- Kingdom: Animalia
- Phylum: Arthropoda
- Clade: Pancrustacea
- Class: Insecta
- Order: Coleoptera
- Suborder: Polyphaga
- Infraorder: Cucujiformia
- Family: Chrysomelidae
- Subfamily: Eumolpinae
- Tribe: Bromiini
- Genus: Eboo; Reid, 1993

Type species
- Odontionopa viridula Erichson, 1842

Synonyms
- Odontionopa Erichson, 1842 (nec Chevrolat in Dejean, 1836); Tomyris Chapuis, 1874 (nec Eichwald, 1831)

Genus of leaf beetles from Australia

Eboo is a genus of leaf beetles in the subfamily Eumolpinae. It is endemic to Australia and contains approximately 50 species. Many of these species show strong sexual dimorphism and feed primarily on Eucalyptus plants.

This genus was previously known as Tomyris (named by Félicien Chapuis in 1874) or Odontionopa (named by Wilhelm Ferdinand Erichson in 1842). However, both of these names were found to be preoccupied, and the genus was renamed to Eboo by C. A. M. Reid in 1993. The generic name is a phonetic rendering of ibu, the Indonesian word for "mother".

The genus is placed in the subtribe Ebooina, also named by Reid, a replacement name for "Tomyrina".

== Species ==
Species include:

- Eboo aenea (Blackburn, 1889)
- Eboo aerata (Lea, 1915)
- Eboo antennata (Blackburn, 1889)
- Eboo antiqua (Lea, 1926)
- Eboo apicicollis (Lea, 1915)
- Eboo aurea (Lea, 1915)
- Eboo aureoviridis (Lea, 1915)
- Eboo compacta (Lea, 1915)
- Eboo curnowi (Lea, 1915)
- Eboo difficilis (Blackburn, 1889)
- Eboo distributa (Lea, 1915)
- Eboo dumbrelli (Lea, 1915)
- Eboo elegantula (Lefèvre, 1885)
- Eboo evanescens (Boheman, 1858)
- Eboo exilis (Lea, 1915)
- Eboo femoralis (Lea, 1915)
- Eboo foveiventris (Lea, 1915)
- Eboo foveolata (Baly, 1878)
- Eboo fugitiva (Lea, 1915)
- Eboo gracilicornis (Lea, 1915)
- Eboo gracilis (Blackburn, 1889)
- Eboo illaetabilis (Lea, 1915)
- Eboo incisa (Lea, 1915)
- Eboo inconspicua (Lea, 1915)
- Eboo insignis (Lea, 1915)
- Eboo intermixta (Oke, 1932)
- Eboo irrasa (Lea, 1915)
- Eboo laeta (Blackburn, 1889)
- Eboo longa (Lea, 1915)
- Eboo longicornis (Blackburn, 1889)
- Eboo lugubrina (Weise, 1923)
- Eboo mediana (Lea, 1915)
- Eboo negligens (Blackburn, 1889)
- Eboo nigra (Lea, 1922)
- Eboo obscura (Blackburn, 1889)
- Eboo picticornis (Lea, 1915)
- Eboo pulchella (Chapuis, 1874)
- Eboo pulcherrima (Lea, 1915)
- Eboo pusilla (Lefèvre, 1885)
- Eboo queenslandica (Lea, 1915)
- Eboo sculpticollis (Lea, 1915)
- Eboo similis (Lea, 1915)
- Eboo soror (Lea, 1915)
- Eboo sublaeta (Lea, 1915)
- Eboo tantilla (Lea, 1915)
- Eboo tepperi (Lea, 1915)
- Eboo villosa (Lea, 1915)
- Eboo viridula (Erichson, 1842)
- Eboo weisei Reid, 1993
- Eboo wiburdi (Lea, 1915)

Synonyms:

- Odontionopa proxima Erichson, 1842: synonym of Eboo viridula (Erichson, 1842)
- Odontionopa queenslandica Weise, 1923, nec Lea, 1915: renamed to Eboo weisei Reid, 1993
