= Uhehlia pardalis =

Scientific classification
- Kingdom: Animalia
- Phylum: Arthropoda
- Clade: Pancrustacea
- Class: Insecta
- Order: Coleoptera
- Suborder: Polyphaga
- Infraorder: Cucujiformia
- Family: Chrysomelidae
- Genus: Uhehlia
- Species: U. pardalis

Binomial name
- Uhehlia pardalis Weise, 1906

Synonyms
- Uhehlia pardalis var. fülleborni Kuntzen, 1912

Species of beetle

Uhehlia pardalis is a species of leaf beetle of East Africa and the Democratic Republic of the Congo. It was first described from Uhehe, a region now in Tanzania, by Julius Weise in 1906.
