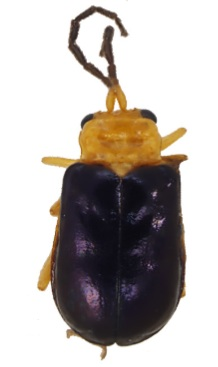

Scientific classification
- Kingdom: Animalia
- Phylum: Arthropoda
- Clade: Pancrustacea
- Class: Insecta
- Order: Coleoptera
- Suborder: Polyphaga
- Infraorder: Cucujiformia
- Family: Chrysomelidae
- Genus: Oroetes
- Species: O. flavicollis

Binomial name
- Oroetes flavicollis Jacoby, 1888

= Oroetes flavicollis =

Species of beetle

Oroetes flavicollis is a species of beetle of the family Chrysomelidae. It is found in Nicaragua, Costa Rica and Panama.

== Description ==
Adults reach a length of about 4.2–5.4 mm. The elytron is violaceous blue with a pale lateral margin.
