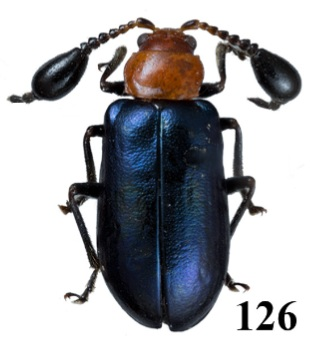

Scientific classification
- Kingdom: Animalia
- Phylum: Arthropoda
- Clade: Pancrustacea
- Class: Insecta
- Order: Coleoptera
- Suborder: Polyphaga
- Infraorder: Cucujiformia
- Family: Chrysomelidae
- Genus: Metacoryna
- Species: M. fulvicollis

Binomial name
- Metacoryna fulvicollis Jacoby, 1888

= Metacoryna fulvicollis =

Species of beetle

Metacoryna fulvicollis is a species of beetle of the family Chrysomelidae. It is found in Mexico (Jalisco, Guanajuato, Guerrero).
