= Trichotheca =

Scientific classification
- Kingdom: Animalia
- Phylum: Arthropoda
- Clade: Pancrustacea
- Class: Insecta
- Order: Coleoptera
- Suborder: Polyphaga
- Infraorder: Cucujiformia
- Family: Chrysomelidae
- Subfamily: Eumolpinae
- Tribe: Bromiini
- Genus: Trichotheca; Baly, 1860

Type species
- Trichotheca hirta Baly, 1860

Genus of leaf beetles from Asia

Trichotheca is a genus of leaf beetles in the subfamily Eumolpinae. It is distributed in South Asia, Southeast Asia and Southern China.

== Species ==
- Trichotheca aeneopicta Bryant, 1924 – Northern India (Himachal Pradesh)
- Trichotheca annularis Tan, 1981 – Western China (Xizang)
- Trichotheca apicalis Pic, 1928 – Southwestern China (Yunnan)
- Trichotheca attenuata Tan, 1992 – Southwestern China (Sichuan)
- Trichotheca beesoni Bryant, 1941 – Kashmir
- Trichotheca bicolor Tan, 1988 – Western China (Xizang)
- Trichotheca brunnea (Tan, 1992) – Southwestern China (Yunnan)
- Trichotheca dentata Tan, 1981 – Western China (Xizang)
- Trichotheca elongata Tan, 1988 – Western China (Xizang)
- Trichotheca flavinotata Tan, 1981 – Western China (Xizang)
- Trichotheca fulvopilosa Chen & Wang, 1976 – Western China (Xizang)
- Trichotheca fuscicornis Chen, 1963 – Western China (Xizang)
- Trichotheca hirta Baly, 1860 – Northern and Northeastern India, Nepal, Pakistan, Hong Kong
- Trichotheca nodicollis Chen & Wang, 1976 – Western China (Xizang)
- Trichotheca nuristanica Medvedev, 1985 – Afghanistan
- Trichotheca parva Chen & Wang, 1976 – Western China (Xizang)
- Trichotheca rufofrontalis Tan, 1992 – Southwestern China (Yunnan)
- Trichotheca similis Tan, 1992 – Southwestern China (Sichuan)
- Trichotheca unicolor Chen & Wang, 1976 – Southwestern China (Yunnan)
- Trichotheca variabilis Gressitt & Kimoto, 1961 – Western China (Xizang), Nepal
- Trichotheca ventralis Chen, 1935 – Southwestern China (Sichuan, Yunnan)
- Trichotheca vietnamica Medvedev, 2015 – Vietnam
