= Luperosoma amplicorne =

Scientific classification
- Kingdom: Animalia
- Phylum: Arthropoda
- Clade: Pancrustacea
- Class: Insecta
- Order: Coleoptera
- Suborder: Polyphaga
- Infraorder: Cucujiformia
- Family: Chrysomelidae
- Genus: Luperosoma
- Species: L. amplicorne

Binomial name
- Luperosoma amplicorne (Baly, 1886)

Synonyms
- Diabrotica amplicornis Baly, 1886

Species of beetle

Luperosoma amplicorne is a species of beetle of the family Chrysomelidae. It is found in Brazil.

== Description ==
Adults reach a length of about 5 mm. Adults are pale yellow-brown. There are two dark spots the head and there are median and lateral dark vittae on the elytron.
