= Pteleon pubescens =

Scientific classification
- Kingdom: Animalia
- Phylum: Arthropoda
- Clade: Pancrustacea
- Class: Insecta
- Order: Coleoptera
- Suborder: Polyphaga
- Infraorder: Cucujiformia
- Family: Chrysomelidae
- Genus: Pteleon
- Species: P. pubescens

Binomial name
- Pteleon pubescens Jacoby, 1892

Species of beetle

Pteleon pubescens is a species of beetle of the family Chrysomelidae. It is found in Mexico (Mexico City).
