= Luperosoma nigricolle =

Scientific classification
- Kingdom: Animalia
- Phylum: Arthropoda
- Clade: Pancrustacea
- Class: Insecta
- Order: Coleoptera
- Suborder: Polyphaga
- Infraorder: Cucujiformia
- Family: Chrysomelidae
- Genus: Luperosoma
- Species: L. nigricolle

Binomial name
- Luperosoma nigricolle Blake, 1966

Species of beetle

Luperosoma nigricolle is a species of beetle of the family Chrysomelidae. It is found in California.

== Description ==
Adults reach a length of about 3 mm. Adults are dark piceous.
