= Monardiella =

Scientific classification
- Kingdom: Animalia
- Phylum: Arthropoda
- Clade: Pancrustacea
- Class: Insecta
- Order: Coleoptera
- Suborder: Polyphaga
- Infraorder: Cucujiformia
- Family: Chrysomelidae
- Subfamily: Eumolpinae
- Tribe: Bromiini
- Genus: Monardiella; Pic, 1940

Type species
- Monardiella subacuminata Pic, 1940

Synonyms
- Pausiropsis Burgeon, 1941

Genus of leaf beetles

Monardiella is a genus of leaf beetles in the subfamily Eumolpinae. Mondardiella can be found in Africa.

== Physical features ==
The species of Monardiella are described as insects with antennal segments approximately three to six twice as long as broad, body segments seven to ten much longer than broad, reaching more than half-way down the elytra, or forewings. They have elongated tarsi and femur with a well-developed tooth. Monardiella setae, bristles, can be found on the elytra of two types: one is curved, adpressed, laterally-flattened and tending to form bands, the other straight, upright and often of even distribution. The pronotum of Monardiella are not domed and have indistinct margins.

== Species ==
Two species are recognised in the genus Monardiella:

- Monardiella gerardi (Burgeon, 1941) – DR Congo
- Monardiella subacuminata Pic, 1940 – Angola
