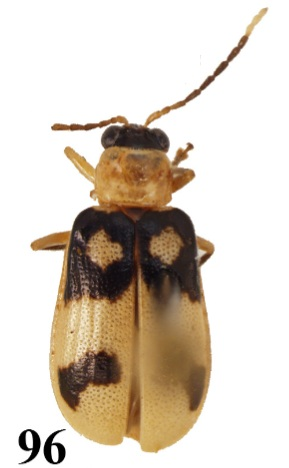

Scientific classification
- Kingdom: Animalia
- Phylum: Arthropoda
- Clade: Pancrustacea
- Class: Insecta
- Order: Coleoptera
- Suborder: Polyphaga
- Infraorder: Cucujiformia
- Family: Chrysomelidae
- Genus: Neobrotica
- Species: N. variabilis

Binomial name
- Neobrotica variabilis Jacoby, 1887

= Neobrotica variabilis =

Species of beetle

Neobrotica variabilis is a species of beetle of the family Chrysomelidae. It is found in Mexico and El Salvador.
