= Luperosoma vittatum =

Scientific classification
- Kingdom: Animalia
- Phylum: Arthropoda
- Clade: Pancrustacea
- Class: Insecta
- Order: Coleoptera
- Suborder: Polyphaga
- Infraorder: Cucujiformia
- Family: Chrysomelidae
- Genus: Luperosoma
- Species: L. vittatum

Binomial name
- Luperosoma vittatum Blake, 1966

Species of beetle

Luperosoma vittatum is a species of beetle of the family Chrysomelidae. It is found in Honduras.

== Description ==
Adults reach a length of about 3.5 mm. Adults are pale yellow brown with a large piceous vitta on the elytron.
