= Luperosoma parvulum =

Scientific classification
- Kingdom: Animalia
- Phylum: Arthropoda
- Clade: Pancrustacea
- Class: Insecta
- Order: Coleoptera
- Suborder: Polyphaga
- Infraorder: Cucujiformia
- Family: Chrysomelidae
- Genus: Luperosoma
- Species: L. parvulum

Binomial name
- Luperosoma parvulum (Jacoby, 1888)

Synonyms
- Luperus parvulus Jacoby, 1888

Species of beetle

Luperosoma parvulum is a species of beetle of the family Chrysomelidae. It is found in Mexico (Guanajuato).
