= Callipta oberthuri =

Scientific classification
- Kingdom: Animalia
- Phylum: Arthropoda
- Clade: Pancrustacea
- Class: Insecta
- Order: Coleoptera
- Suborder: Polyphaga
- Infraorder: Cucujiformia
- Family: Chrysomelidae
- Genus: Callipta
- Species: C. oberthuri

Binomial name
- Callipta oberthuri (Fairmaire, 1876)

Synonyms
- Pseudocolaspis oberthuri Fairmaire, 1876

Species of beetle

Callipta oberthuri is a species of leaf beetle of Tunisia and Algeria, described by Léon Fairmaire in 1876.
