= Callipta =

Scientific classification
- Kingdom: Animalia
- Phylum: Arthropoda
- Clade: Pancrustacea
- Class: Insecta
- Order: Coleoptera
- Suborder: Polyphaga
- Infraorder: Cucujiformia
- Family: Chrysomelidae
- Subfamily: Eumolpinae
- Tribe: Bromiini
- Genus: Callipta; Lefèvre, 1885

Type species
- Calliope fausti Weise, 1882

Synonyms
- Calliope Weise, 1882 (preoccupied); Arachnipta Medvedev, 1957

Genus of leaf beetles

Callipta is a genus of leaf beetles in the subfamily Eumolpinae. It contains four species, which are distributed in the Caucasus, Central to East Asia and North Africa. The genus was originally named Calliope by Julius Weise in 1882; however, as Édouard Lefèvre pointed out, the name "Calliope" had been used a number of times for genera described previously (for instance, the passerine bird genus Calliope Gould, 1836), so it was renamed to Callipta by Lefèvre in 1885.

== Species ==
- Callipta borealis Lopatin, 1976 – Uzbekistan, China (Xinjiang)
- Callipta fausti (Weise, 1882)
  - Callipta fausti badghyza Lopatin, 1997 – Turkmenistan (South Turkmenistan: Badkhyz)
  - Callipta fausti balchana Lopatin, 1997 – Turkmenistan (West Turkmenistan)
  - Callipta fausti fausti (Weise, 1882) – Azerbaijan, southern European Russia
  - Callipta fausti murgabica Lopatin, 1997 – Turkmenistan (South Turkmenistan: Murgab River)
  - Callipta fausti palvanica Lopatin, 1997 – Turkmenistan (North Turkmenistan: Kaplankyr)
  - Callipta fausti turcomana Medvedev, 1957 – Turkmenistan (Kopet-Dag mountain ridge)
- Callipta iranica Lopatin, 1997 – Iran
- Callipta oberthuri (Fairmaire, 1876) – Algeria, Tunesia
