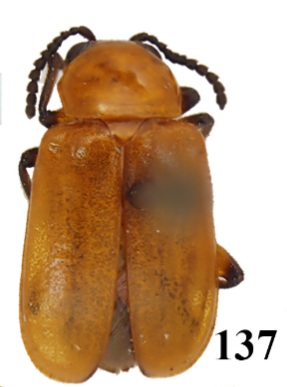

Scientific classification
- Kingdom: Animalia
- Phylum: Arthropoda
- Clade: Pancrustacea
- Class: Insecta
- Order: Coleoptera
- Suborder: Polyphaga
- Infraorder: Cucujiformia
- Family: Chrysomelidae
- Genus: Pteleon
- Species: P. brevicornis

Binomial name
- Pteleon brevicornis (Jacoby, 1887)

Synonyms
- Exora brevicornis Jacoby, 1887; Exora californica Wilcox, 1953

= Pteleon brevicornis =

Species of beetle

Pteleon brevicornis is a species of beetle of the family Chrysomelidae. It is found in Mexico (Baja California, Coahuila) and the southwestern United States (southern California to Texas and in Utah, Nevada, and northern New Mexico).
