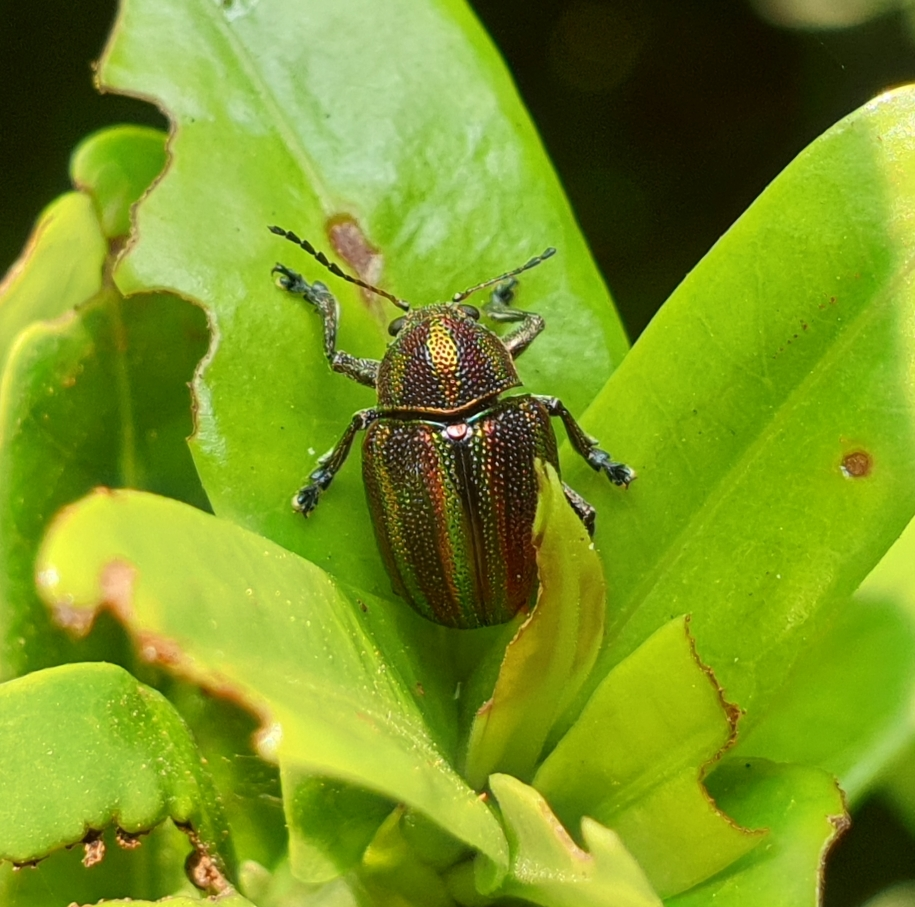
- Eurypelta modesta, Sri Lanka

Scientific classification
- Kingdom: Animalia
- Phylum: Arthropoda
- Clade: Pancrustacea
- Class: Insecta
- Order: Coleoptera
- Suborder: Polyphaga
- Infraorder: Cucujiformia
- Family: Chrysomelidae
- Subfamily: Eumolpinae
- Tribe: Bromiini
- Genus: Eurypelta; Lefèvre, 1885

Type species
- Euraspis vittatus (= Chrysomela modesta Fabricius, 1792) Chapuis, 1874

Synonyms
- Euraspis Chapuis, 1874 (nec Blanchard, 1851)

= Eurypelta =

Genus of leaf beetles from India

Eurypelta is a genus of leaf beetles in the subfamily Eumolpinae. It is known from India.

The genus was originally named Euraspis by Félicien Chapuis in 1874. However, the name was determined to be a spelling error of Euryaspis, which was preoccupied by the beetle genus Euryaspis Blanchard, 1851, so Chapuis's genus was renamed to Eurypelta by Édouard Lefèvre in 1885.

== Species ==
- Eurypelta modesta (Fabricius, 1792)
- Eurypelta splendida Medvedev, 2018
