= Callipta fausti =

Scientific classification
- Kingdom: Animalia
- Phylum: Arthropoda
- Clade: Pancrustacea
- Class: Insecta
- Order: Coleoptera
- Suborder: Polyphaga
- Infraorder: Cucujiformia
- Family: Chrysomelidae
- Genus: Callipta
- Species: C. fausti

Binomial name
- Callipta fausti (Weise, 1882)

Synonyms
- sensu stricto: Calliope fausti Weise, 1882; turcomana: Callipta smirnovi Medvedev, 1957

Species of leaf beetle

Callipta fausti is a species of leaf beetle found in the Caucasus region and Turkmenistan.

== Subspecies ==
- Callipta fausti badghyza Lopatin, 1997 – Turkmenistan (South Turkmenistan: Badkhyz)
- Callipta fausti balchana Lopatin, 1997 – Turkmenistan (West Turkmenistan)
- Callipta fausti fausti (Weise, 1882) – Azerbaijan, southern European Russia
- Callipta fausti murgabica Lopatin, 1997 – Turkmenistan (South Turkmenistan: Murgab River)
- Callipta fausti palvanica Lopatin, 1997 – Turkmenistan (North Turkmenistan: Kaplankyr)
- Callipta fausti turcomana Medvedev, 1957 – Turkmenistan (Kopet-Dag mountain ridge)
