= Damelia =

Scientific classification
- Kingdom: Animalia
- Phylum: Arthropoda
- Clade: Pancrustacea
- Class: Insecta
- Order: Coleoptera
- Suborder: Polyphaga
- Infraorder: Cucujiformia
- Family: Chrysomelidae
- Subfamily: Eumolpinae
- Tribe: Bromiini
- Genus: Damelia; Clark, 1864

Type species
- Damelia marshalli Clark, 1864

Genus of leaf beetles

Damelia is a genus of leaf beetles in the subfamily Eumolpinae. It is known from Fiji and the Solomon Islands.

== Species ==
- Damelia cyanea Bryant, 1937 – Guadalcanal
- Damelia leveri Bryant, 1937 – Guadalcanal, Bougainville
- Damelia marshalli Clark, 1864 – Fiji
- Damelia metallica Bryant, 1937 – Ulawa
- Damelia rugosa Bryant, 1957 – Fiji
- Damelia salomonensis Bryant, 1937 – Makira, Owaraha
- Damelia verrucosa Bryant, 1957 – Fiji
