= Euphrytus parvicollis =

Scientific classification
- Kingdom: Animalia
- Phylum: Arthropoda
- Clade: Pancrustacea
- Class: Insecta
- Order: Coleoptera
- Suborder: Polyphaga
- Infraorder: Cucujiformia
- Family: Chrysomelidae
- Genus: Euphrytus
- Species: E. parvicollis

Binomial name
- Euphrytus parvicollis Schaeffer, 1933

Species of beetle

Euphrytus parvicollis is a species of leaf beetle. It is found in Mexico and Arizona.
