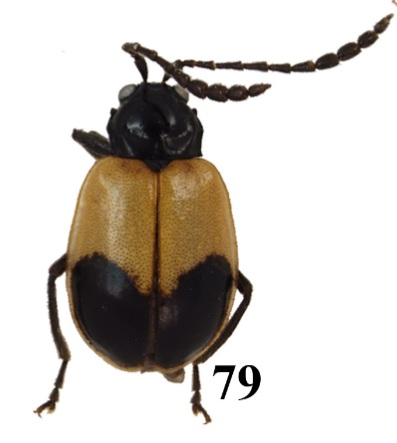

Scientific classification
- Kingdom: Animalia
- Phylum: Arthropoda
- Clade: Pancrustacea
- Class: Insecta
- Order: Coleoptera
- Suborder: Polyphaga
- Infraorder: Cucujiformia
- Family: Chrysomelidae
- Genus: Ensiforma
- Species: E. inflaticornis

Binomial name
- Ensiforma inflaticornis (Bechyné, 1956)

= Ensiforma inflaticornis =

Species of beetle

Ensiforma inflaticornis is a species of beetle of the family Chrysomelidae. It is found in Peru.
