= Ensiforma aeropaga =

Scientific classification
- Kingdom: Animalia
- Phylum: Arthropoda
- Clade: Pancrustacea
- Class: Insecta
- Order: Coleoptera
- Suborder: Polyphaga
- Infraorder: Cucujiformia
- Family: Chrysomelidae
- Genus: Ensiforma
- Species: E. aeropaga

Binomial name
- Ensiforma aeropaga (Bechyné, 1956)

Species of beetle

Ensiforma aeropaga is a beetle of the family Chrysomelidae. The scientific name of the species was first published in 1956 by Jan Bechyné.
