= Uhehlia nerissidioides =

Scientific classification
- Kingdom: Animalia
- Phylum: Arthropoda
- Clade: Pancrustacea
- Class: Insecta
- Order: Coleoptera
- Suborder: Polyphaga
- Infraorder: Cucujiformia
- Family: Chrysomelidae
- Genus: Uhehlia
- Species: U. nerissidioides

Binomial name
- Uhehlia nerissidioides Kuntzen, 1912

Species of beetle

Uhehlia nerissidioides is a species of leaf beetle of the Democratic Republic of the Congo, described by Heinrich Kuntzen in 1912.
