= Luperosoma subsulcatum =

Scientific classification
- Kingdom: Animalia
- Phylum: Arthropoda
- Clade: Pancrustacea
- Class: Insecta
- Order: Coleoptera
- Suborder: Polyphaga
- Infraorder: Cucujiformia
- Family: Chrysomelidae
- Genus: Luperosoma
- Species: L. subsulcatum

Binomial name
- Luperosoma subsulcatum (Horn, 1893)

Synonyms
- Phyllecthrus subsulcatus Horn, 1893

Species of beetle

Luperosoma subsulcatum is a species of leaf beetle in the family Chrysomelidae. It is found in Central America (Mexico) and North America (New Mexico, Texas, Arizona).

== Description ==
Adults reach a length of about 3.5 mm. Adults have a reddish brown head, while the elytron is piceous.
