= Miraces modesta =

Scientific classification
- Kingdom: Animalia
- Phylum: Arthropoda
- Clade: Pancrustacea
- Class: Insecta
- Order: Coleoptera
- Suborder: Polyphaga
- Infraorder: Cucujiformia
- Family: Chrysomelidae
- Genus: Miraces
- Species: M. modesta

Binomial name
- Miraces modesta (Horn, 1893)

Species of beetle

Miraces modesta is a species of skeletonizing leaf beetle in the family Chrysomelidae. It is found in North America.
