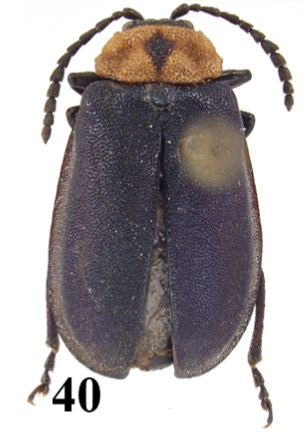

Scientific classification
- Kingdom: Animalia
- Phylum: Arthropoda
- Clade: Pancrustacea
- Class: Insecta
- Order: Coleoptera
- Suborder: Polyphaga
- Infraorder: Cucujiformia
- Family: Chrysomelidae
- Genus: Ophraea
- Species: O. rugosa

Binomial name
- Ophraea rugosa Jacoby, 1886

= Ophraea rugosa =

Species of beetle

Ophraea rugosa is a species of beetle of the family Chrysomelidae. It is found in the United States (Arizona), Mexico (Oaxaca) and Costa Rica.
