= Luperosoma schwarzi =

Scientific classification
- Kingdom: Animalia
- Phylum: Arthropoda
- Clade: Pancrustacea
- Class: Insecta
- Order: Coleoptera
- Suborder: Polyphaga
- Infraorder: Cucujiformia
- Family: Chrysomelidae
- Genus: Luperosoma
- Species: L. schwarzi

Binomial name
- Luperosoma schwarzi (Horn, 1896)

Synonyms
- Phyllecthrus schwarzi Horn, 1896

Species of beetle

Luperosoma schwarzi is a species of beetle of the family Chrysomelidae. It is found in the United States (New Mexico, Texas, Arizona, Kansas, California).

== Description ==
Adults reach a length of about 4.5–5 mm. Adults have a reddish brown head, while the elytron and legs are dark.
