= Macetes =

Scientific classification
- Kingdom: Animalia
- Phylum: Arthropoda
- Clade: Pancrustacea
- Class: Insecta
- Order: Coleoptera
- Suborder: Polyphaga
- Infraorder: Cucujiformia
- Family: Chrysomelidae
- Subfamily: Eumolpinae
- Tribe: Bromiini
- Genus: Macetes; Chapuis, 1874

Type species
- Macetes albicans Chapuis, 1874

Genus of leaf beetles from Southeast Africa

Macetes is a genus of leaf beetles in the subfamily Eumolpinae. It is distributed in Southeast Africa, from Lake Tanganyika to the Eastern Cape province in South Africa.

== Species ==
Species include:

- Macetes albicans Chapuis, 1874
- Macetes clypeata Jacoby, 1900
- Macetes ornatipennis Jacoby, 1901
- Macetes puberula (Marshall, 1865)
- Macetes pusilla Jacoby, 1904
- Macetes rugicollis Jacoby, 1904
- Macetes thoracica Jacoby, 1903
- Macetes variegata Jacoby, 1901
