= Nerissus hispidulus =

Scientific classification
- Kingdom: Animalia
- Phylum: Arthropoda
- Clade: Pancrustacea
- Class: Insecta
- Order: Coleoptera
- Suborder: Polyphaga
- Infraorder: Cucujiformia
- Family: Chrysomelidae
- Genus: Nerissus
- Species: N. hispidulus

Binomial name
- Nerissus hispidulus Lefèvre, 1886

Species of beetle

Nerissus hispidulus is a species of leaf beetle of the Democratic Republic of the Congo and Ivory Coast, described by Édouard Lefèvre in 1886.
