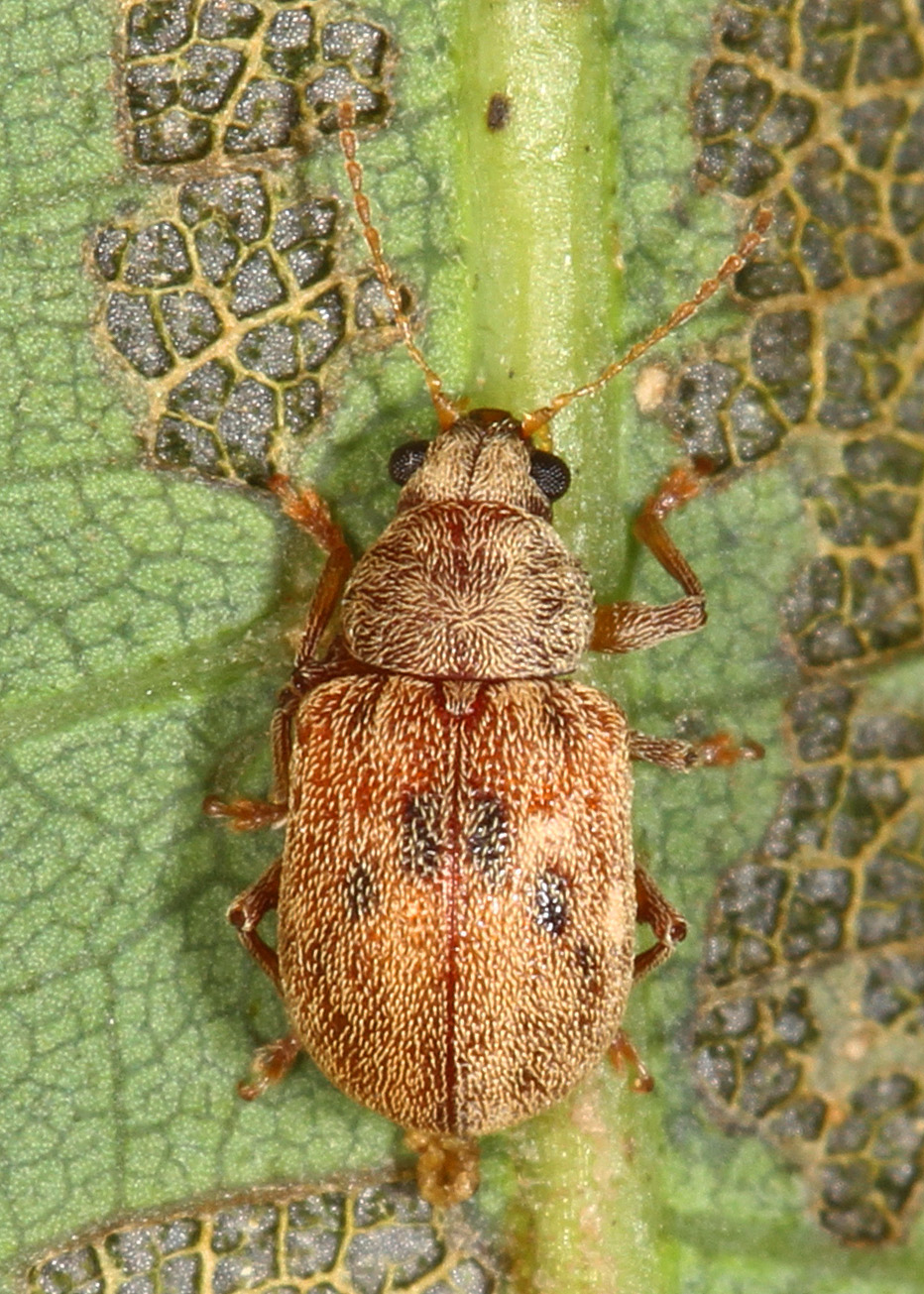

Scientific classification
- Kingdom: Animalia
- Phylum: Arthropoda
- Clade: Pancrustacea
- Class: Insecta
- Order: Coleoptera
- Suborder: Polyphaga
- Infraorder: Cucujiformia
- Family: Chrysomelidae
- Genus: Demotina
- Species: D. modesta

Binomial name
- Demotina modesta Baly, 1874

= Demotina modesta =

Species of beetle

Demotina modesta is a species of leaf beetle. It is an adventive species in the southeastern United States in North America, while its native range includes Japan and Korea. It is very abundant on oaks. It is known to be parthenogenetic in part of its native range, and no males are known from North America.

== Biology ==
Demotina modesta is a summer breeder and probably hibernates as larvae or pupae. It lays eggs singly on the undersides of leaves and covers them with excrement.
