= Uhehlia =

Scientific classification
- Kingdom: Animalia
- Phylum: Arthropoda
- Clade: Pancrustacea
- Class: Insecta
- Order: Coleoptera
- Suborder: Polyphaga
- Infraorder: Cucujiformia
- Family: Chrysomelidae
- Subfamily: Eumolpinae
- Tribe: Bromiini
- Genus: Uhehlia; Weise, 1906

Genus of leaf beetles from Africa

Uhehlia is a genus of leaf beetles in the subfamily Eumolpinae. It is known from Africa. It was first described by the German entomologist Julius Weise in 1906 from Uhehe, a region now in Tanzania.

== Species ==
- Uhehlia goetzei Kuntzen, 1912
- Uhehlia nerissidioides Kuntzen, 1912
- Uhehlia pardalis Weise, 1906
- Uhehlia uniformis Pic, 1939
