= Eka nigra =

Scientific classification
- Kingdom: Animalia
- Phylum: Arthropoda
- Clade: Pancrustacea
- Class: Insecta
- Order: Coleoptera
- Suborder: Polyphaga
- Infraorder: Cucujiformia
- Family: Chrysomelidae
- Subfamily: Eumolpinae
- Tribe: Bromiini
- Genus: Eka; Maulik, 1931
- Species: E. nigra

Binomial name
- Eka nigra Maulik, 1931

Species of leaf beetle from Seychelles

Eka nigra is a species of leaf beetle endemic to Silhouette Island in the Seychelles, in the low country near the coast, and the only member of the genus Eka. The species was first described by the Indian entomologist Samarendra Maulik, from a specimen collected by the Percy Sladen Trust Expedition to the Indian Ocean in 1908. The generic name comes from the Sanskrit word एक (éka), meaning "single", "alone". The genus is related to Trichochrysea.

== Description ==
The body is oblong-ovate and colored black, with a very faint purplish tinge. The four segments at the base of the antennae are coloured brown, and the remaining seven segments are coloured black. The legs are brown mixed with blackish colour, the tarsi more blackish. The beetles are entirely covered in white erect hairs on the upper and under sides; those on the elytra are arranged in longitudinal rows and each hair arises out of a puncture. The length of the beetles are 1.75 mm (0.069 in).
