= Pachnephoptrus =

Scientific classification
- Kingdom: Animalia
- Phylum: Arthropoda
- Clade: Pancrustacea
- Class: Insecta
- Order: Coleoptera
- Suborder: Polyphaga
- Infraorder: Cucujiformia
- Family: Chrysomelidae
- Subfamily: Eumolpinae
- Tribe: Bromiini
- Genus: Pachnephoptrus; Reitter, 1892

Type species
- Pachnephoptrus weisei Reitter, 1892

Synonyms
- Bromiodes Jacoby, 1895; Leprotella Jacoby, 1900

Genus of leaf beetles from Asia and Europe

Pachnephoptrus is a genus of leaf beetles in the subfamily Eumolpinae. The genus includes five species; one of them, P. weisei, is distributed from the Transcaucasus to Central Asia, while the other four are found in the Himalayas.

== Species ==
- Pachnephoptrus cashmirensis (Jacoby, 1900) – Kashmir
- Pachnephoptrus indicus (Jacoby, 1895) – India (Himachal Pradesh), Nepal
- Pachnephoptrus squamosus (Bryant, 1923) – India (Himachal Pradesh)
- Pachnephoptrus storozhenkoi Moseyko, 2026 – India (Himachal Pradesh)
- Pachnephoptrus weisei Reitter, 1892 – Armenia, Azerbaijan, Turkey, Iran, Kazakhstan, Turkmenistan, Uzbekistan, Afghanistan

Species incertae sedis:

- Bromiodes squamosus var. brunneus Papp, 1951 – India (West Bengal); not a variety of P. squamosus and probably belongs to another genus

== Host plants ==
P. weisei has been reported on plants of the genus Astragalus (Fabaceae), while P. squamosus has been reported attacking young leaves of pear trees in an orchard in Shimla, India.
