= Dermoxanthus =

Scientific classification
- Kingdom: Animalia
- Phylum: Arthropoda
- Clade: Pancrustacea
- Class: Insecta
- Order: Coleoptera
- Suborder: Polyphaga
- Infraorder: Cucujiformia
- Family: Chrysomelidae
- Subfamily: Eumolpinae
- Tribe: Bromiini
- Genus: Dermoxanthus; Baly, 1859

Type species
- Dermoxanthus fulvus Baly, 1859

Genus of leaf beetles from Africa

Dermoxanthus is a genus of leaf beetles in the subfamily Eumolpinae. It is distributed in Africa.

== Species ==
- Dermoxanthus alternans Weise, 1909
- Dermoxanthus bicolor Weise, 1919
- Dermoxanthus brancuccii Zoia, 2010
- Dermoxanthus camerunensis Burgeon, 1941
- Dermoxanthus clavareaui Burgeon, 1941
- Dermoxanthus conjunctus Weise, 1902
- Dermoxanthus fraternus Baly, 1859
- Dermoxanthus fulvus Baly, 1859
- Dermoxanthus gedyei Bryant, 1958
- Dermoxanthus hunti Bryant, 1958
- Dermoxanthus kapiriensis Burgeon, 1941
- Dermoxanthus macinnesi Bryant, 1958
- Dermoxanthus maynei Burgeon, 1941
- Dermoxanthus montanus Bryant, 1958
- Dermoxanthus piceipes Zoia, 2017
- Dermoxanthus ruficolor Pic, 1953
- Dermoxanthus spinipes Lefèvre, 1877
- Dermoxanthus sulcipennis Weise, 1902
- Dermoxanthus vittatus Zoia, 2010

Dermoxanthus monardi Pic, 1940 is a synonym of Pseudedusia fulvipes Jacoby, 1898.
