= Luperosoma nigrum =

Scientific classification
- Kingdom: Animalia
- Phylum: Arthropoda
- Clade: Pancrustacea
- Class: Insecta
- Order: Coleoptera
- Suborder: Polyphaga
- Infraorder: Cucujiformia
- Family: Chrysomelidae
- Genus: Luperosoma
- Species: L. nigrum

Binomial name
- Luperosoma nigrum Blake, 1958

Species of beetle

Luperosoma nigrum is a species of beetle of the family Chrysomelidae. It is found in Colombia.

== Description ==
Adults reach a length of about 3 mm. Adults are black except for a narrow pale sutural and marginal edging on the elytron.
