= Luperosoma parallelum =

Scientific classification
- Kingdom: Animalia
- Phylum: Arthropoda
- Clade: Pancrustacea
- Class: Insecta
- Order: Coleoptera
- Suborder: Polyphaga
- Infraorder: Cucujiformia
- Family: Chrysomelidae
- Genus: Luperosoma
- Species: L. parallelum

Binomial name
- Luperosoma parallelum (Horn, 1893)

Synonyms
- Phyllecthrus parallelus Horn, 1893

Species of beetle

Luperosoma parallelum is a species of beetle of the family Chrysomelidae. It is found in the United States (Texas, Oklahoma, Kansas).

== Description ==
Adults reach a length of about 4.3–5.2 mm. Adults have a reddish brown head and the elytron is piceous with a pale margin.
