= Profidia =

Profidia Temporal range: late Oligocene–early Miocene

Scientific classification
- Kingdom: Animalia
- Phylum: Arthropoda
- Clade: Pancrustacea
- Class: Insecta
- Order: Coleoptera
- Suborder: Polyphaga
- Infraorder: Cucujiformia
- Family: Chrysomelidae
- Subfamily: Eumolpinae
- Tribe: Bromiini
- Genus: †Profidia; Gressitt, 1963
- Species: †P. nitida

Binomial name
- †Profidia nitida Gressitt, 1963

Extinct genus of leaf beetles

Profidia is an extinct genus of leaf beetles in the subfamily Eumolpinae. It contains only one species, Profidia nitida. It is known from Oligo-Miocene amber found near Simojovel in Chiapas, Mexico.

The species was described by American entomologist Judson Linsley Gressitt in 1963, using a single specimen (UCMP 12630) from the collections of the University of California Museum of Paleontology in Berkeley, California.
