= Damasus albicans =

Scientific classification
- Kingdom: Animalia
- Phylum: Arthropoda
- Clade: Pancrustacea
- Class: Insecta
- Order: Coleoptera
- Suborder: Polyphaga
- Infraorder: Cucujiformia
- Family: Chrysomelidae
- Subfamily: Eumolpinae
- Tribe: Bromiini
- Genus: Damasus; Chapuis, 1874
- Species: D. albicans

Binomial name
- Damasus albicans Chapuis, 1874

Species of leaf beetle from Syria and Turkey

Damasus albicans is a species of beetle in the leaf beetle family. It is the only member of the genus Damasus, and was first described by the Belgian entomologist Félicien Chapuis in 1874. The species is distributed in Syria and Turkey.
