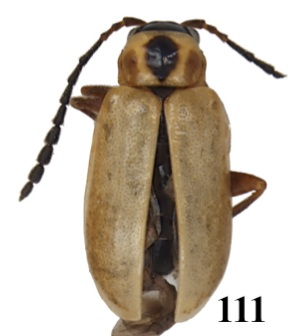

Scientific classification
- Kingdom: Animalia
- Phylum: Arthropoda
- Clade: Pancrustacea
- Class: Insecta
- Order: Coleoptera
- Suborder: Polyphaga
- Infraorder: Cucujiformia
- Family: Chrysomelidae
- Genus: Luperosoma
- Species: L. marginatum

Binomial name
- Luperosoma marginatum Jacoby, 1891

= Luperosoma marginatum =

Species of beetle

Luperosoma marginatum is a species of beetle of the family Chrysomelidae. It is found in Ecuador.

== Description ==
Adults reach a length of about 3-3.5 mm. Adults are pale yellow-brown. There is a dark brown median area on the pronotum and the elytron has a brown median vitta in some specimens, while in others this vitta is so pale that is nearly invisible.
