= Lepina (beetle) =

Scientific classification
- Kingdom: Animalia
- Phylum: Arthropoda
- Clade: Pancrustacea
- Class: Insecta
- Order: Coleoptera
- Suborder: Polyphaga
- Infraorder: Cucujiformia
- Family: Chrysomelidae
- Subfamily: Eumolpinae
- Tribe: Bromiini
- Genus: Lepina; Baly, 1863

Type species
- Lepina inconspicua Baly, 1863

Synonyms
- Demotinella Jacoby, 1908

Genus of leaf beetles

Lepina is a genus of leaf beetles in the subfamily Eumolpinae. It is widely distributed in Southeast Asia. It is very close to the genus Apolepis.

== Etymology ==
The name of the genus is derived from the ancient Greek word λεπίς (lepis), meaning "scale".

== Description ==
The genus Lepina has the following characteristics: The body is oblong, subcylindrical, and covered with narrow curved scales. The head is small, deeply set in the thorax, perpendicular; the eyes are entire; the frontoclypeus (or epistome) has a convex triangle shape. The antennae are sub-filiform; the last five segments are almost globular, the 2nd segment is thickened and is distinctly larger than the 3rd segment. The prothorax is broader than long, subcylindrical; the prosternum is separated from the episternum by a sutural groove. The legs are moderately robust; the pro- and metafemora have a small ventral tooth; the basal segment of the tarsi is barely longer than the second; the claws are bifid.

Lepina shares many characters with the genus Apolepis, but differs from it by the sutural groove between the prosternum and episternum, the shape of the frontoclypeus (in Apolepis, it does not have a convex triangle shape), and the lateral edging of the pronotum (in Apolepis, it takes the form of a row of teeth, which are not present in Lepina).

== Species ==
The genus includes five species:

- Lepina atra (Lefèvre, 1887) – Sumatra, Borneo
- Lepina aureovillosa Jacoby, 1894 – Tanimbar Islands
- Lepina balyi (Jacoby, 1896) – Sumatra
- Lepina inconspicua Baly, 1863 – Penang Island
- Lepina pectoralis (Jacoby, 1908) – Myanmar: Tanintharyi Region: Tavoy
