= Cryocolaspis =

Scientific classification
- Kingdom: Animalia
- Phylum: Arthropoda
- Clade: Pancrustacea
- Class: Insecta
- Order: Coleoptera
- Suborder: Polyphaga
- Infraorder: Cucujiformia
- Family: Chrysomelidae
- Subfamily: Eumolpinae
- Tribe: Bromiini
- Genus: Cryocolaspis; Flowers, 2004
- Species: C. crinita

Binomial name
- Cryocolaspis crinita Flowers, 2004

Genus of leaf beetles from Costa Rica

Cryocolaspis is a genus of leaf beetles in the subfamily Eumolpinae. It contains only one species, Cryocolaspis crinita, which is known from the mountains of central Costa Rica. It was first established by the American entomologist R. Wills Flowers in 2004.

The generic name is said to be a combination of the Greek word cryo (meaning cold) and the eumolpine generic name Colaspis. The specific name, crinita, is the Latin word for hairy. In ancient Greek kryos (κρὐος) is a noun, meaning "icy cold" or "frost".
