= Georgiy Jacobson =

Russian entomologist (1871–1926)

G.G. Jacobson
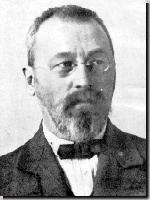
- Pioneering Russian entomologist
- Born: 1871; St Petersburg
- Died: 23 November 1926 (aged 54–55)
- Education: St Petersburg University
- Known for: Beetles of Russia & Western Europe
- Scientific career
- Fields: Entomology of Chrysomelidae beetles
- Workplaces: Imperial Academy of Sciences
- Author abbrev. (zoology): Jakobson

Georgiy Georgiyevich Jacobson also known as Jakobson (Russian: Георгий Георгиевич Якобсон, 1871 – 23 November 1926) was a pioneering Russian entomologist, known especially for his 900-page book on beetles.

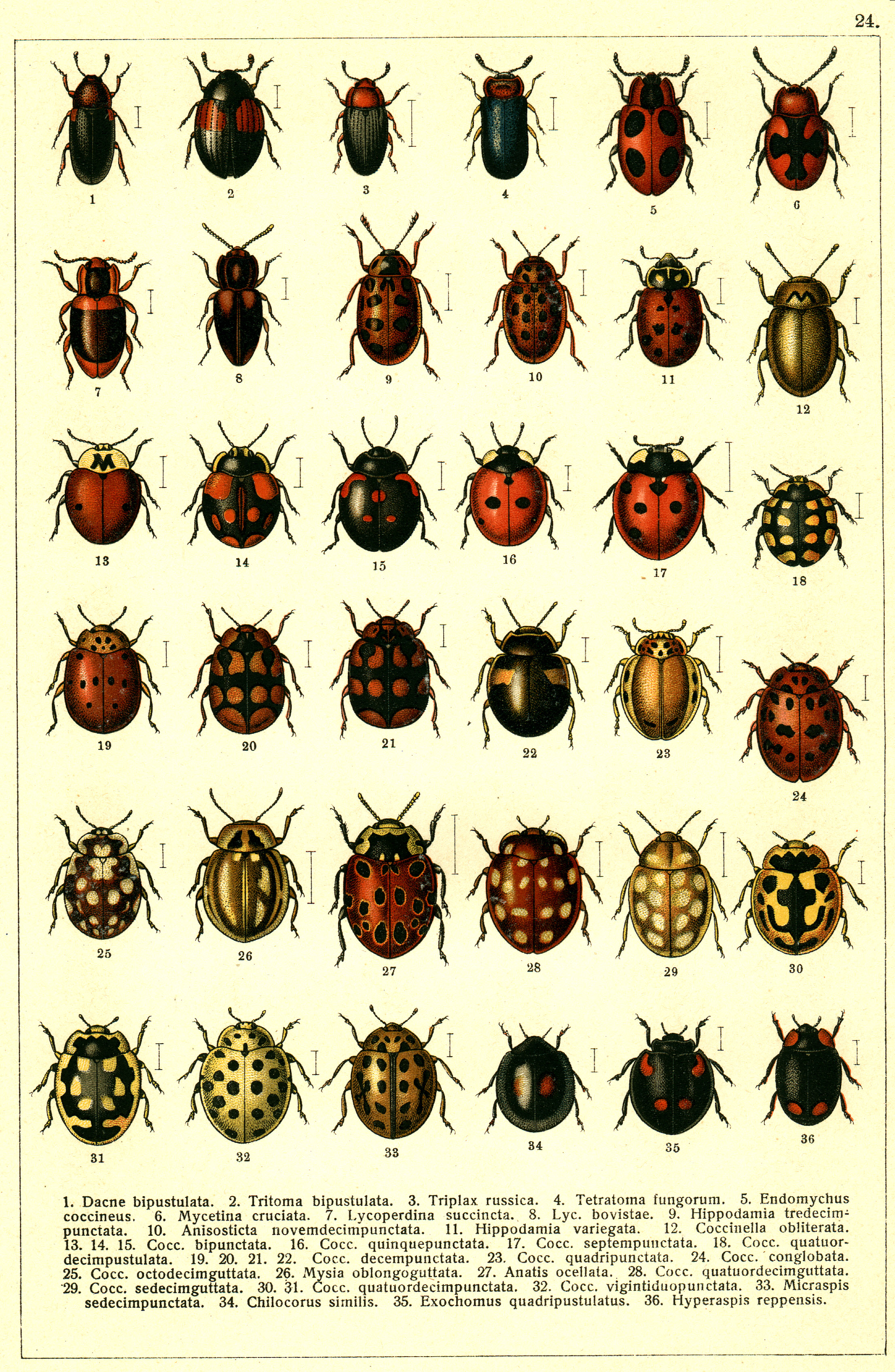
Ladybirds, a colour plate in Jacobson's Beetles, 1905

== Biography ==
Jacobson was born in St Petersburg, and in 1893 he graduated from St Petersburg University's Physics and Mathematics faculty. He was a zoologist at the Zoological Museum of the Russian Academy of Sciences. He was posted to different parts of Russia to study its insects. He published papers mainly on the systematics and zoogeography of Chrysomelidae beetles.

== Beetles ==
Jacobson's Beetles was first published in 1905 by Devriena, St Petersburg. The eleventh and last edition appeared in 1915. Many of the fine colour plates were based on Carl Gustav Calwer's Kaeferbuch, with updates to the names of some of the beetles. This saving of effort on illustration allowed Jacobson to focus on illustrating species of beetle that had never been illustrated before. The monograph covered over 2000 species.

== Works ==
Jacobson is best known as the author of the magisterial 900-page Beetles of Russia, Western Europe and neighbouring countries (1905-1915), and co-author, with Valentin Lvovich Bianchi, of Orthoptera and Pseudoneuroptera of the Russian Empire (1905).

His other works include the following:

- Beitrag zur Systematik der Geotrypini (Proceedings of the Russian Entomological Society, XXVI, 1892)
- Essay on the Tunicata of the White Sea (Tr. Spb. Common. Est., XXIII, 1892)
- Chrysomelidae palaearcticae novae (Proceedings of the Russian Entomological Society, XXVIII, 1894; XXIX, 1895 Ezheg. Zool. Museum, II, 1897; III, 1898; IV, 1899)
- Über den äusseren Bau flügelloser Käfer (Ezheg. Zool. Museum, IV, 1899)
- Symbola ad cognitionem faunae Rossiae asiaticae (Finsk. Vet.-Soc. F ö rh., XLIII, 1901)
- Zoological Research in the New World (Notes of the Imperial Academy of Sciences, 1898)
- Termites of Russia (Tr. Bureau of Entomology, IV, 1904)

His zoological author abbreviation is Jakobson.
