= Chen Shixiang =

Chinese entomologist

Chen Shixiang or Sicien H. Chen (Chinese: 陈世骧; 5 November 1905 – 25 January 1988) was a Chinese entomologist. From 1954 to 1982 he was the director of the Entomological Society of China (中国昆虫学会). He also founded the journal Acta Zootaxonomica Sinica, of which he was editor-in-chief from 1954 to 1969.

Chen was born in Jiaxing, Zhejiang Province where his father Chih-Kung Chen (陈志巩) was involved in pest control to deal with the rice borer. He went to Fudan University in Shanghai in 1924 and graduated in 1928. Through the influence of Auguste Savio, entomologist and member of the French Entomological Society, who was teaching there he then went to the University of Paris and studied entomology and examined the collections in the National Museum of Natural History. He met Yon-Yon Zia (谢蕴贞) in Paris and they were engaged in January 1933. He studied the chrysomelidae of Tonkin and was awarded the Prix Passet (1935) for his dissertation Recherches sur les Chrysomelinae de la Chine et du Tonkin. He worked for some time in the British Museum and in Germany before turning to China. He worked at the Institute of Botany and Zoology from 1934 and in 1944 he moved to the institute of zoology at the Academia Sinica. He was made director of the laboratory of entomology in 1950 following the creation of the People's Republic of China. In 1953 he directed the Institute of Entomology and in 1962 he moved to the Institute of Zoology.

He was involved in studies on locusts and pathogen carrying insects. His work on locusts led to a state award in 1982. He worked with Hung-Fu Chu (朱弘复), Yu-Su Liu (刘玉素), Shih-Chun Ma (马世骏), Chun-Teh Chin (钦俊德), Chin-Jen Luh (陆近仁), Chung-Lo Liu (刘崇乐), Pang-Hua Tsai (蔡邦华), Lan-Chou Feng (冯兰洲), Yao Hsiung (熊尧), Kwen-Yuan Kung (龚坤元), Yung-Chang Chao (赵养昌), and other zoologists. He helped establish the Chinese Entomological Society in 1973 along with Chenfu F. Wu (胡经甫) and We-I Yang (杨惟义). He was a member of the Communist Party of China from 1979. He supported an American visit in 1980 and at the 17th International Congress of Entomology (1980) in Hamburg, he gave a lecture on the evolution and classification of the Chrysomelidae.
