= Martin Jacoby =

German entomologist (1842–1907)

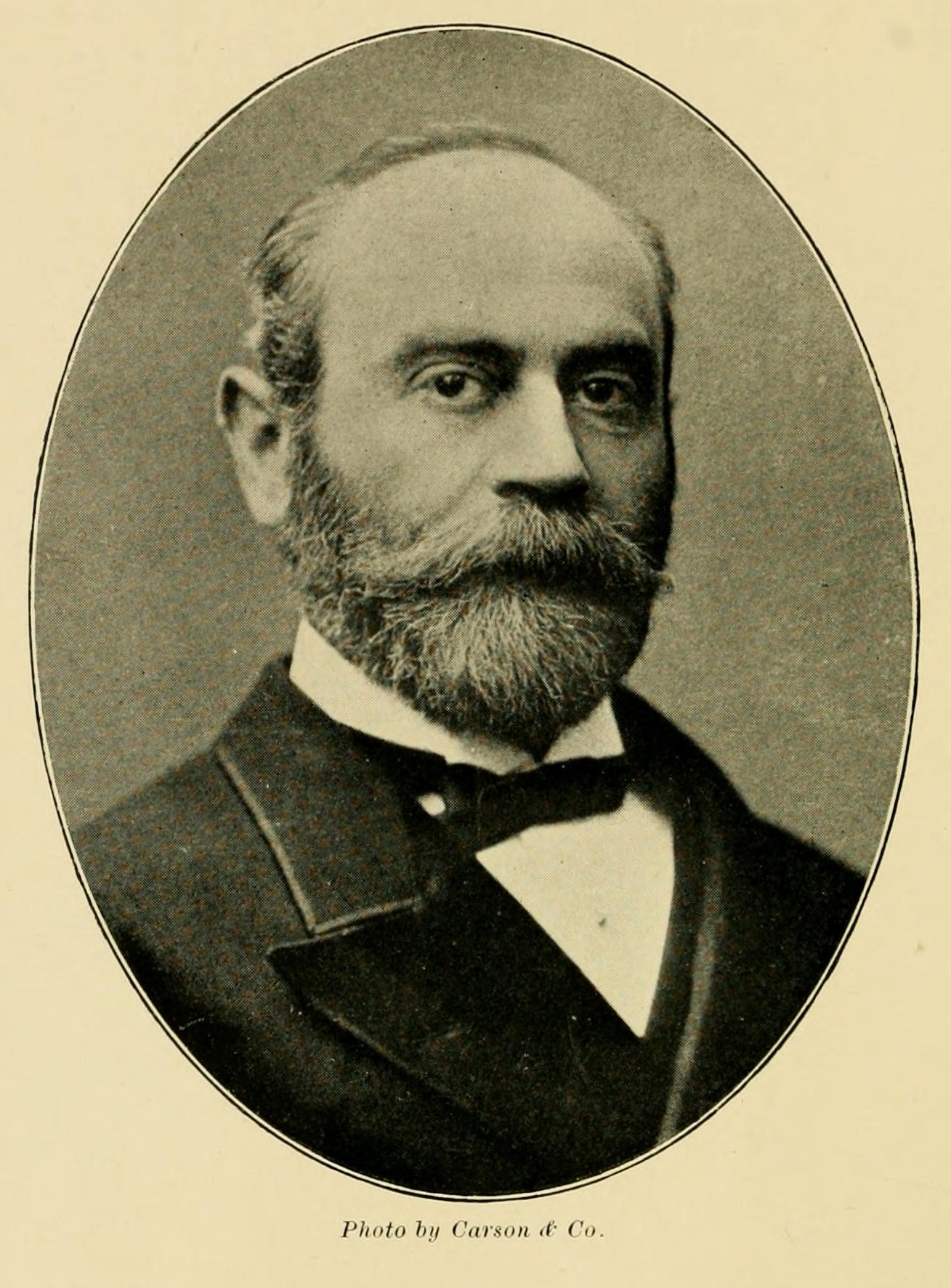

Martin Jacoby (12 April 1842, Altona, Duchy of Holstein – 24 December 1907, London) was a German entomologist who specialised in Coleoptera, especially Chrysomelidae (formerly known as Phytophaga). He was also a musician who played in the orchestra of the Royal Italian Opera in London, and later became a violin tutor.

== Biography ==
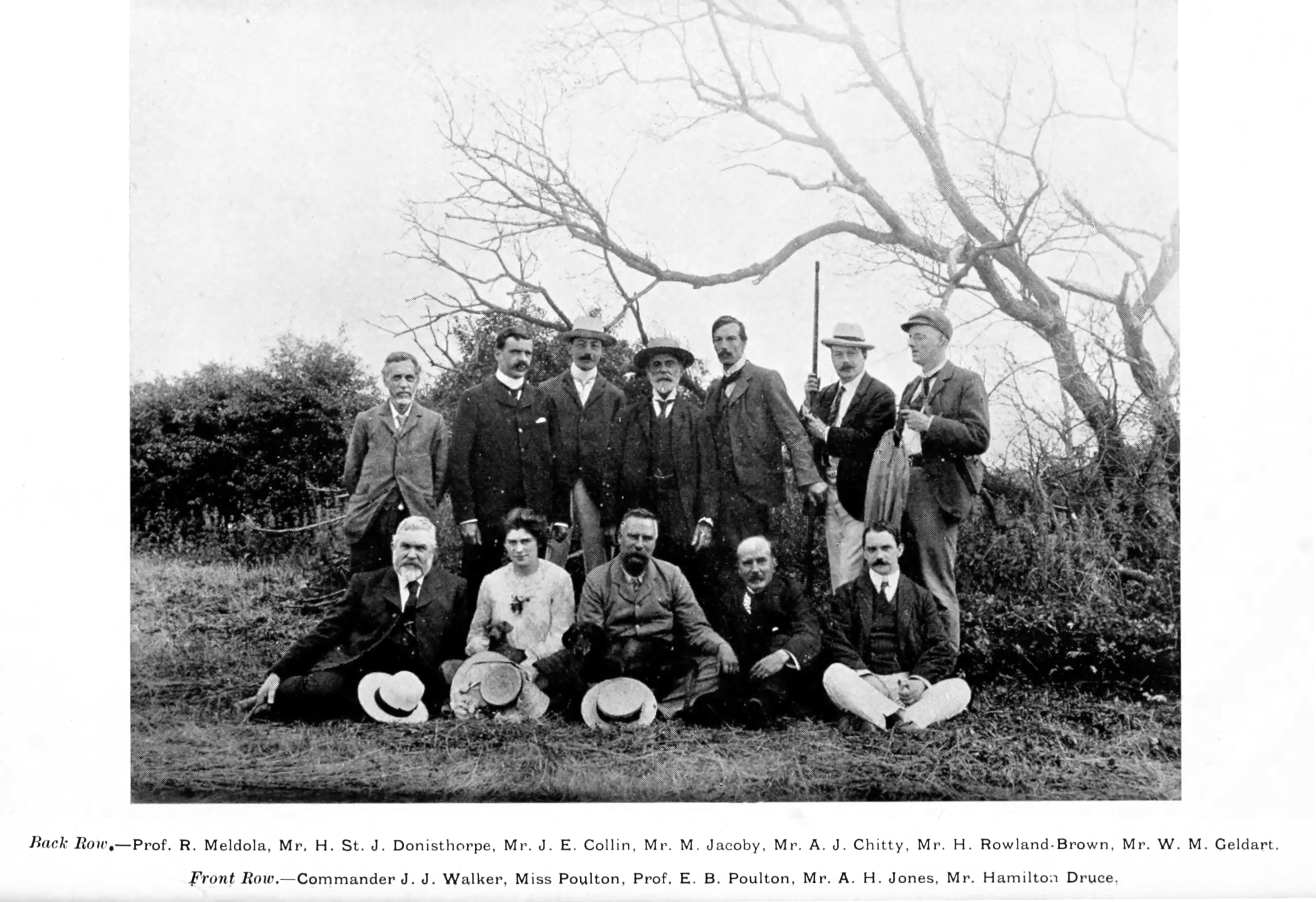
Jacoby with the Entomological Society in 1904 (standing, centre)

Jacoby was born in Altona near Hamburg and grew up near the port. He later became a leather merchant but his interest was in music and natural history. He studied violin and at the age of twenty he gave up his leather business and moved to England to join Sir Charles Hallé's orchestra in Manchester. He also began to collect insects and birds even before leaving Germany. He was in touch with many German entomological collectors like Thörey, Koltze, and Gräser. He sold off his first large entomological collection to Van der Poll of Holland in 1880. The ornithologist Edward Hargitt advised him to concentrate on a particular group of insects. He chose to study the phytophagous beetles. He moved later to play violin at the Royal Italian Opera in London. He examined the Chrysomelidae from South America and India and contributed to the volumes of the Fauna of British India and the Biologia Centrali Americana. He was elected Fellow of the Entomological Society of London in 1886 and was a regular at meetings and outdoor events. He served as a specialist referee for the magazine The Entomologist when it was taken over by the editor John Henry Leech in 1889. He played violin at the Entomological Club supper thrown each year by George Henry Verrall. He had two daughters and a son.

== Collection ==
Jacoby's collection is divided between the Museum of Comparative Zoology, Harvard University and the Natural History Museum, London.

== Selected works ==
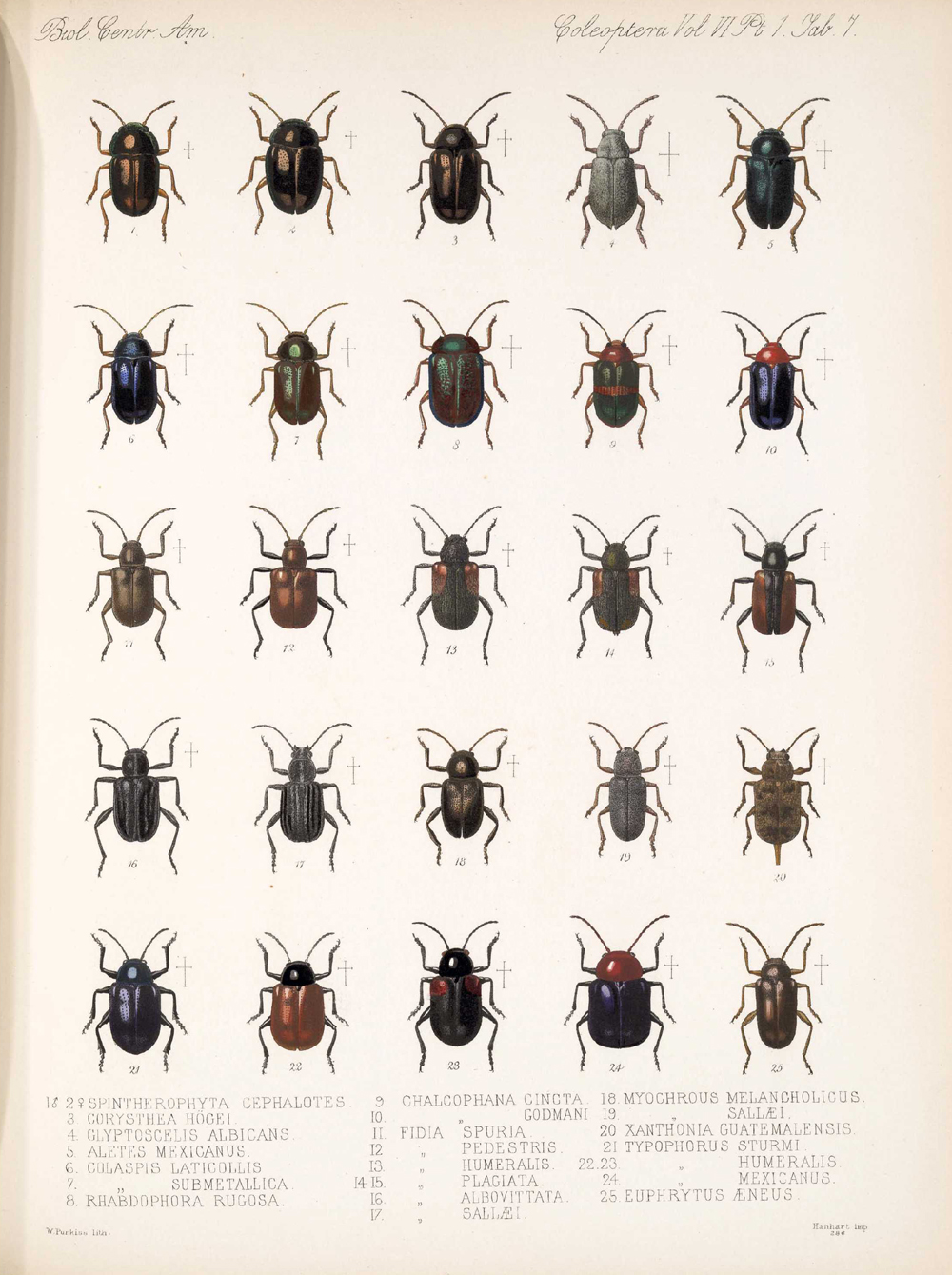
Plate from Insecta. Coleoptera. Phytophaga. Biologia Centrali-Americana

A complete list of publications was published in The Entomologist.

- 1880–1892. Insecta. Coleoptera. Phytophaga (part). Volume VI, Part 1 (Supp.) of Biologia Centrali-Americana
- 1885–1894 Insecta. Coleoptera. Phytophaga (part). Volume VI, Part 2 of Biologia Centrali-Americana
- 1899. Descriptions of the new species of phytophagous Coleoptera obtained by Dr. Dohrn in Sumatra.Stettiner Entomologische Zeitung 60: 259–313, 1 pl.
- 1903. Coleoptera Phytophaga Fam. Sagridae.in: P. Wytsman (ed.), Genera Insectorum. Fascicule 14A. P. Wytsman, Brussels, pp. 1–11 1 pl.
- 1904. Coleoptera Phytophaga Fam. Sagridae. in: P. Wytsman (ed.), Genera Insectorum. Fascicule 14B. P. Wytsman, Brussels, pp. 13–14.
- 1904. with H. Clavareau. Coleoptera Phytophaga Fam. Donacidae. in: P. Wytsman (ed.), Genera Insectorum. Fascicule 21. P. Wytsman, Brussels, 15 pp., 1 pl.
- 1904. with H. Clavareau Coleoptera Phytophaga Fam. Crioceridae. in: P. Wytsman (ed.), Genera Insectorum. Fascicule 23. P. Wytsman, Brussels, 40 pp., 1 pl.
- 1905. with H. Clavareau. Coleoptera Phytophaga Fam. Megascelidae. in: P. Wytsman (ed.), Genera Insectorum. Fascicule 32. P. Wytsman, Brussels, 6 pp., 1 pl.
- 1905. with H. Clavareau. Coleoptera Phytophaga Fam. Megalopidae. in: P. Wytsman (ed.), Genera Insectorum. Fascicule 33. P. Wytsman, Brussels, 20 pp., 2 pls.
- 1906. with H. Clavareau. Coleoptera Phytophaga Fam. Chrysomelidae Subfam. Clytrinae. in: P. Wytsman (ed.), Genera Insectorum. Fascicule 49. P. Wytsman, Brussels, 87 pp., 5 pls.
- 1908. (posthumous) Coleoptera. Chrysomelidae. Volume 1. The Fauna of British India, Including Ceylon and Burma.

== Other sources ==
- Horn, Walther (H. R.) 1908: Dtsch. Entomol. Z. 1908 427–428
- Musgrave, A. 1932: Bibliography of Australian Entomology 1775–1930.Sydney
- Data related to Martin Jacoby at Wikispecies
