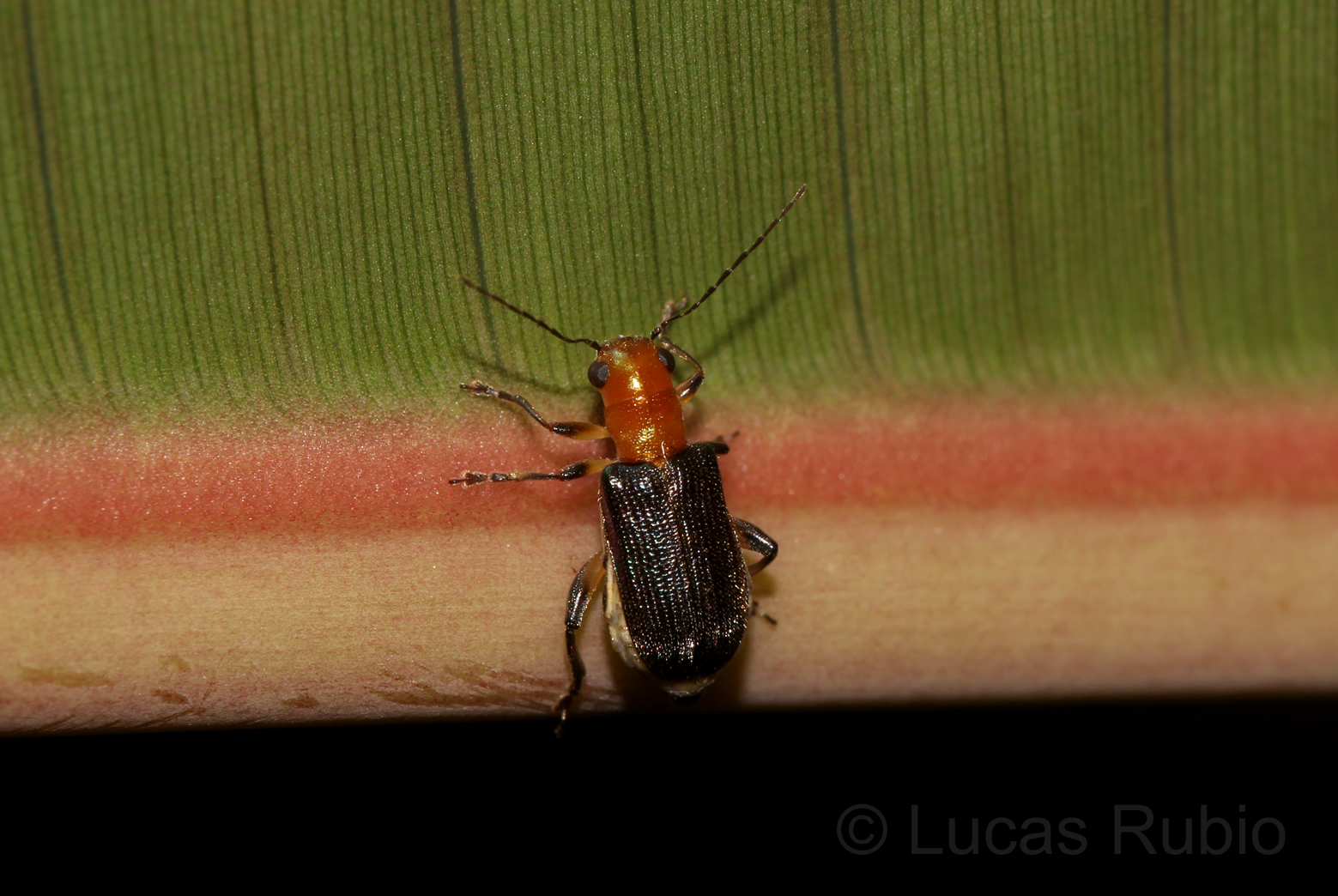
- Megascelis caeruleipennis

Scientific classification
- Kingdom: Animalia
- Phylum: Arthropoda
- Clade: Pancrustacea
- Class: Insecta
- Order: Coleoptera
- Suborder: Polyphaga
- Infraorder: Cucujiformia
- Family: Chrysomelidae
- Subfamily: Eumolpinae
- Tribe: Megascelidini
- Genus: Megascelis; Latreille, 1825

Type species
- Megascelis aenea Sturm, 1826

Synonyms
- Megascelis Dejean, 1821 (nomen nudum)

= Megascelis =

Genus of leaf beetles

Megascelis is a genus of leaf beetles in the subfamily Eumolpinae. It is known from both North and South America. There are around 140 described species in Megascelis.

The genus is traditionally placed in the tribe Megascelidini, which was formerly considered a separate subfamily. However, according to ITIS, it is now placed in Eumolpini.

== Nomenclature ==
The generic name "Megascelis" first appeared as a nomen nudum in Dejean's Catalogue of Coleoptera in 1821. According to Barber & Bridwell (1940), the name Megascelis became available in Sturm (1826), where the species Megascelis aenea is described. This species is considered the type species of the genus. However, according to Tiape Gómez & Savini (2001), the name Megascelis should instead be attributed to Latreille (1825), who was the first to give a description of the genus.

== Species ==
These species belong to the genus Megascelis:

- Megascelis acuminata Pic, 1910
- Megascelis acutipennis Lacordaire, 1845
- Megascelis aenea Sturm, 1826^{g}
- Megascelis aerea Lacordaire, 1845
- Megascelis affinis Lacordaire, 1845
- Megascelis altamira Tiape Gómez & Savini, 2001
- Megascelis amabilis Lacordaire, 1845
  - Megascelis amabilis amabilis Lacordaire, 1845
  - Megascelis amabilis caripennis Bechyné, 1997
- Megascelis ambigua Clark, 1866
- Megascelis anguina Lacordaire, 1845
- Megascelis anisobia Tiape Gómez & Savini, 2001
- Megascelis argutula Lacordaire, 1845
- Megascelis asperula Lacordaire, 1845^{g}
- Megascelis aureola Lacordaire, 1845
- Megascelis baeri Pic, 1910
- Megascelis basalis Baly, 1878
- Megascelis bitaeniata Lacordaire, 1845
- Megascelis boliviensis Pic, 1911
- Megascelis briseis Bates, 1866
- Megascelis brunnipennis Clark, 1866
- Megascelis brunnipes Lacordaire, 1845
- Megascelis caeruleipennis Pic, 1914
- Megascelis carbonera Tiape Gómez & Savini, 2001
- Megascelis championi Jacoby, 1888
- Megascelis chloris Lacordaire, 1845^{g}
- Megascelis circumducta Lacordaire, 1845
- Megascelis cleroides Bates, 1866
- Megascelis coccinea Papp, 1951
- Megascelis collaris Jacoby, 1888
- Megascelis columbina Lacordaire, 1845
- Megascelis corcula Bates, 1866
- Megascelis crenipes Lacordaire, 1845
- Megascelis crucifera Clark, 1866
- Megascelis cyanoptera Kirsch, 1875
- Megascelis decora Bates, 1866
- Megascelis diducta Weise, 1921
- Megascelis dilecta Clark, 1866
- Megascelis discicollis Kirsch, 1875
- Megascelis dispar Bates, 1866
- Megascelis donckieri Pic, 1910
- Megascelis doralis Clark, 1866
- Megascelis dryas Clark, 1866
- Megascelis dubiosa Jacoby, 1878
- Megascelis elegans Baly, 1861
- Megascelis elegantula Lacordaire, 1845
- Megascelis exclamationis Clark, 1866
- Megascelis exilis Lacordaire, 1845
- Megascelis fasciolata Lacordaire, 1845^{g}
- Megascelis fatuella Lacordaire, 1845^{g}
- Megascelis femoralis Jacoby, 1878
- Megascelis femorata Baly, 1878
- Megascelis filicornis Weise, 1921
- Megascelis fissurata Tiape Gómez & Savini, 2001
- Megascelis flavipes Lacordaire, 1845^{g}
- Megascelis frenata Lacordaire, 1845
  - Megascelis frenata bicolor Lacordaire, 1845
  - Megascelis frenata frenata Lacordaire, 1845
- Megascelis frontalis Clark, 1866
- Megascelis fulgida Lacordaire, 1845
- Megascelis fulvipes Lacordaire, 1845
- Megascelis fusipes Tiape Gómez & Savini, 2001
- Megascelis gounellei Pic, 1911
- Megascelis gracilis Lacordaire, 1845
- Megascelis grayi Clark, 1866
- Megascelis herbacea Lacordaire, 1845
- Megascelis humeronotata Clark, 1866
- Megascelis inscriptis Papp, 1952
- Megascelis insignis Lacordaire, 1845
- Megascelis integra Kirsch, 1875
- Megascelis jacobyi Clavareau, 1905
- Megascelis joliveti Papp, 1952
- Megascelis lacertina Lacordaire, 1845
- Megascelis laevicoma Bates, 1866
- Megascelis larvata Clark, 1866
- Megascelis lemoides Monrós, 1959
- Megascelis lucida Lacordaire, 1845
- Megascelis luculenta Lacordaire, 1845^{g}
- Megascelis melancholica Jacoby, 1878
- Megascelis mexicana Jacoby, 1888
- Megascelis minuta Jacoby, 1888
- Megascelis miranda Tiape Gómez & Savini, 2001
- Megascelis misella Lacordaire, 1845
- Megascelis mucronata Lacordaire, 1845
- Megascelis nigripennis Bates, 1866
- Megascelis nitidula (Fabricius, 1801)
- Megascelis obscurevittata Bates, 1866
- Megascelis opalina Lacordaire, 1845
- Megascelis ornata Jacoby, 1878
- Megascelis parallela Harold, 1870
- Megascelis picturata Monrós, 1959
- Megascelis postica Lacordaire, 1845
- Megascelis posticata Baly, 1878
- Megascelis prasina Chevrolat, 1844
- Megascelis princeps Bates, 1866
- Megascelis proteus Tiape Gómez & Savini, 2001
- Megascelis puella Lacordaire, 1845
- Megascelis purpurea Perty, 1832
- Megascelis purpureicollis Jacoby, 1877
- Megascelis purpureipennis Clark, 1866^{g}
- Megascelis purpureiotincta Clark, 1866
- Megascelis quadrimaculata Bates, 1866
- Megascelis quadrisignata Jacoby, 1888
- Megascelis robusta Jacoby, 1888
- Megascelis rubricollis Bates, 1866
- Megascelis ruficollis Kirsch, 1875
- Megascelis rufipes Lacordaire, 1845^{g}
- Megascelis rufotestacea Clark, 1866
- Megascelis sacerdotalis Clark, 1866
- Megascelis sallaei Jacoby, 1888
- Megascelis sapphireipennis Lacordaire, 1845
- Megascelis satrapa Lacordaire, 1845
- Megascelis semipurpurea Clark, 1866
- Megascelis semiviolacea Pic, 1910
- Megascelis semiviridis Pic, 1914^{g}
- Megascelis smaragdula Lacordaire, 1845
- Megascelis socialis Bates, 1866
- Megascelis spinipes Jacoby, 1888
- Megascelis stratiotica Lacordaire, 1845
- Megascelis submetallescens Jacoby, 1878
- Megascelis subtilis Boheman, 1859^{i c g}
- Megascelis suturalis Lacordaire, 1845
- Megascelis taeniata Kirsch, 1875
- Megascelis tenella Lacordaire, 1845^{g}
- Megascelis texana Linell, 1898^{i c g b}
- Megascelis tibialis Jacoby, 1888
- Megascelis titan Clark, 1866
- Megascelis tricolor Lacordaire, 1845
- Megascelis unicolor Lacordaire, 1845^{g}
- Megascelis virgo Lacordaire, 1845
- Megascelis viridana Lacordaire, 1845
- Megascelis viridipallens Clark, 1866
- Megascelis viridis Illiger, 1807
- Megascelis viridisimplex Clark, 1866
- Megascelis vittata (Fabricius, 1801)^{g}
- Megascelis vittatipennis Jacoby, 1888
- Megascelis yepezi Tiape Gómez & Savini, 2001
- Megascelis yungarum Monrós, 1959

Data sources: i = ITIS, c = Catalogue of Life, g = GBIF, b = Bugguide.net

Species transferred to other genera:

- Megascelis curta Lacordaire, 1845: transferred to Psathyrocerus
