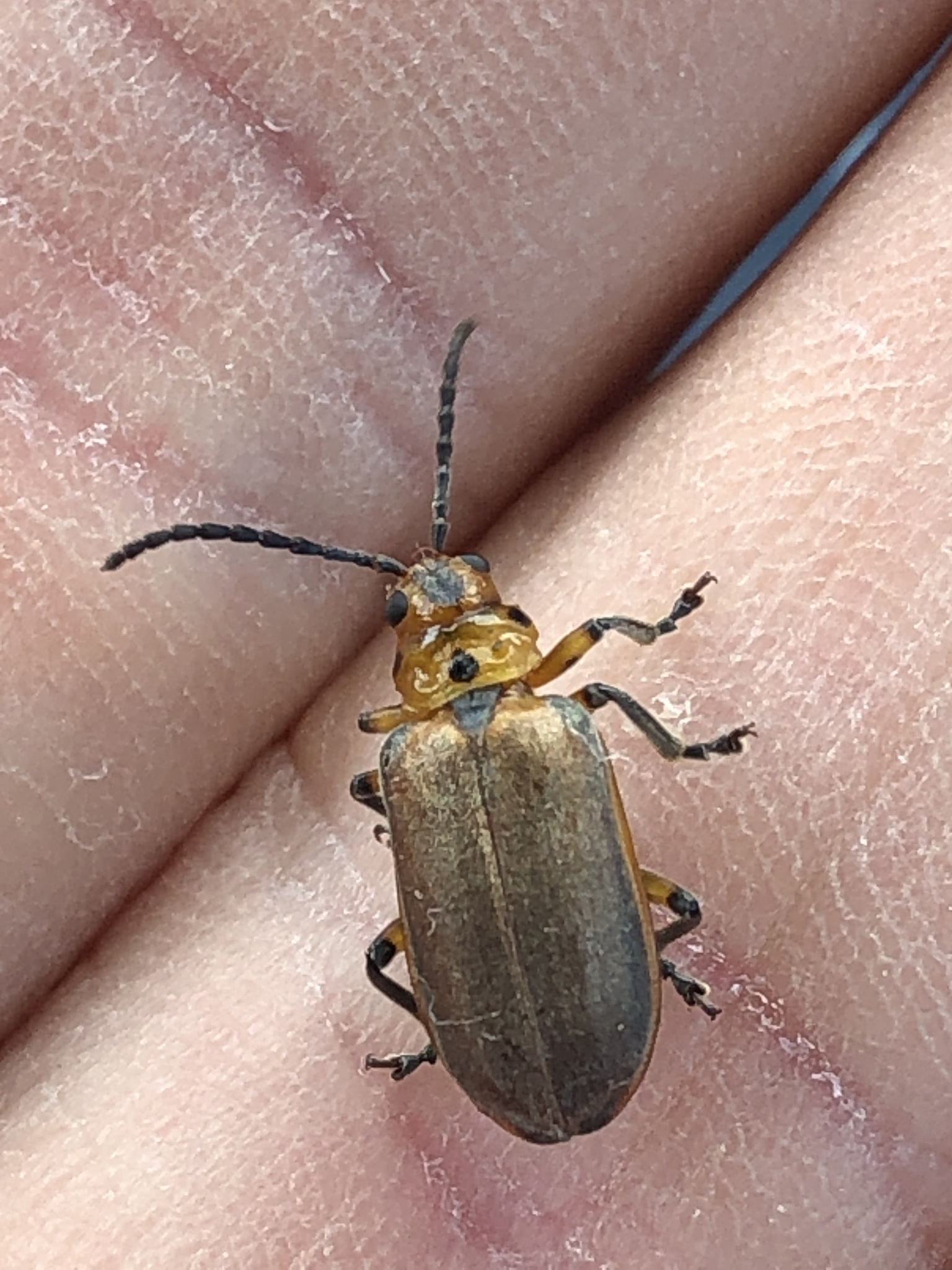
- Poneridia semipullata, figleaf beetle, Australia

Scientific classification
- Kingdom: Animalia
- Phylum: Arthropoda
- Clade: Pancrustacea
- Class: Insecta
- Order: Coleoptera
- Suborder: Polyphaga
- Infraorder: Cucujiformia
- Family: Chrysomelidae
- Genus: Poneridia
- Species: P. semipullata

Binomial name
- Poneridia semipullata (Clark, 1864)

= Poneridia semipullata =

Species of skeletonizing leaf beetle

Poneridia semipullata, the figleaf beetle, is a species of skeletonizing leaf beetle in the family Chrysomelidae, found mainly in Australia.
