= Cubispa =

Scientific classification
- Kingdom: Animalia
- Phylum: Arthropoda
- Clade: Pancrustacea
- Class: Insecta
- Order: Coleoptera
- Suborder: Polyphaga
- Infraorder: Cucujiformia
- Family: Chrysomelidae
- Subfamily: Eumolpinae
- Tribe: Cubispini
- Genus: Cubispa; Barber, 1946

Type species
- Cubispa turquino Barber, 1946

Species
- Cubispa esmeralda; Cubispa turquino

Genus of beetles

Cubispa is a genus of leaf beetles consisting of two species from Central America and the Caribbean. It is classified within the tribe Cubispini, which is placed within either the Eumolpinae or the Cassidinae. Beetles in the genus are wingless, and are associated with cloud forests.

== Taxonomy ==
The genus Cubispa was originally established by Herbert Spencer Barber for a single species described from Cuba, Cubispa turquino, and was placed in the subfamily Hispinae (now included in Cassidinae), in the tribe Cephaloleini. It was transferred to the subfamily Eumolpinae in 1954 by Francisco Monrós, who placed the genus in its own tribe, Cubispini. A second species for the genus, Cubispa esmeralda, was described by C.L. Staines from Guatemala in 2000. A second genus, Lobispa, was described and placed in the tribe Cubispini in 2001.

According to Borowiec & Świętojańska (2014), the placement of the tribe Cubispini and the genus Cubispa is still uncertain, and they prefer to exclude Cubispa from Eumolpinae and retain it in Cassidinae.

== Species ==
There are two species included in Cubispa:

- Cubispa esmeralda Staines, 2000 – found in Guatemala
- Cubispa turquino Barber, 1946 – found in Cuba
