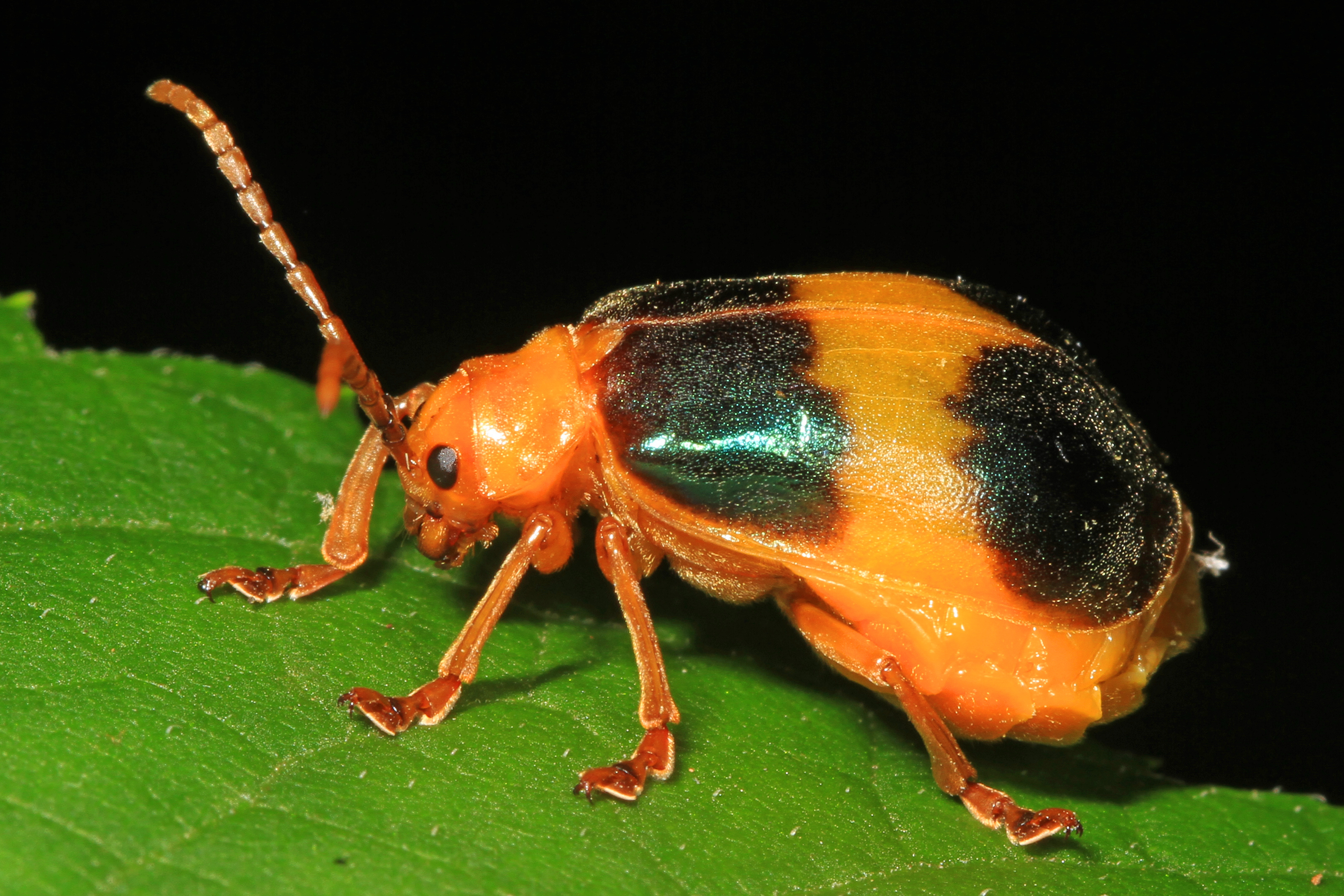
- Monocesta coryli

Scientific classification
- Kingdom: Animalia
- Phylum: Arthropoda
- Clade: Pancrustacea
- Class: Insecta
- Order: Coleoptera
- Suborder: Polyphaga
- Infraorder: Cucujiformia
- Family: Chrysomelidae
- Tribe: Galerucini
- Genus: Monocesta; H. Clark, 1865

= Monocesta =

Genus of beetles

Monocesta is a genus of skeletonizing leaf beetles and flea beetles in the family Chrysomelidae. There are at least three described species in Monocesta.

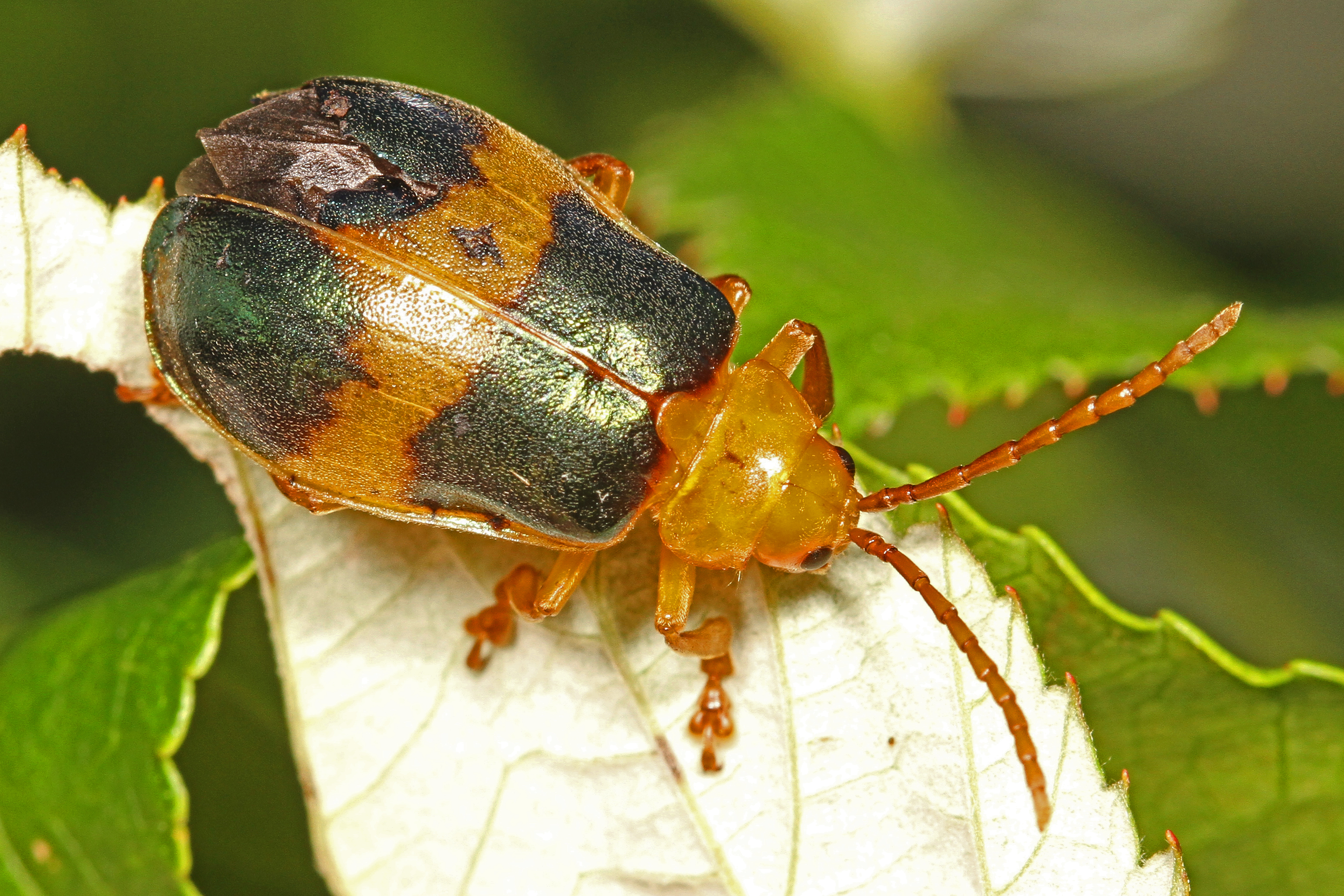
Monocesta coryli

== Species ==
These three species belong to the genus Monocesta:

- Monocesta coryli (Say, 1824)^{i c g b} (larger elm leaf beetle)
- Monocesta equestris Clark, 1865^{g}
- Monocesta illustris Clark, 1865^{g}

Data sources: i = ITIS, c = Catalogue of Life, g = GBIF, b = Bugguide.net
