= Chrysopida =

Scientific classification
- Kingdom: Animalia
- Phylum: Arthropoda
- Clade: Pancrustacea
- Class: Insecta
- Order: Coleoptera
- Suborder: Polyphaga
- Infraorder: Cucujiformia
- Family: Chrysomelidae
- Subfamily: Eumolpinae
- Tribe: Typophorini
- Genus: Chrysopida; Baly, 1861

Type species
- Chrysopida adonis (= Colaspis attelaboides Erichson, 1834) Baly, 1861

Genus of leaf beetles

Chrysopida is a genus of leaf beetles in the subfamily Eumolpinae. It is distributed in the Philippines, Indonesia and Taiwan.

== Species ==
The following species are placed in the genus:

- Chrysopida attelaboides (Erichson, 1834) – Philippines (Luzon)
- Chrysopida aureovillosa Lefèvre, 1885 – Philippines (Bohol)
- Chrysopida depressicollis Lefèvre, 1885 – Philippines (Luzon)
- Chrysopida festiva Baly, 1861 – Philippines (Luzon, Negros)
- Chrysopida insignis Baly, 1867 – Philippines (Luzon)
- Chrysopida multisulcata Medvedev, 1995 – Philippines (Panay)
- Chrysopida murina Baly, 1867 – Philippines (Luzon, Samar, Babuyan Islands), Taiwan
- Chrysopida nigrita Weise, 1913 – Philippines (Luzon)
- Chrysopida pubipennis Lefèvre, 1885 – Philippines (Luzon)
- Chrysopida regalis Baly, 1864 – Sulawesi, Halmahera
- Chrysopida semperi Lefèvre, 1885 – Philippines (Mindanao)
- Chrysopida subglabrata Jacoby, 1898 – Philippines
- Chrysopida tristis Medvedev, 1995 – Philippines (Luzon, Samar)
- Chrysopida viridis Medvedev, 1995 – Philippines (Mindoro)

The following are synonyms of other species:

- Chrysopida adonis Baly, 1861: synonym of Chrysopida attelaboides (Erichson, 1834)
- Chrysopida curta Lefèvre, 1885: synonym of Chrysopida murina Baly, 1867
