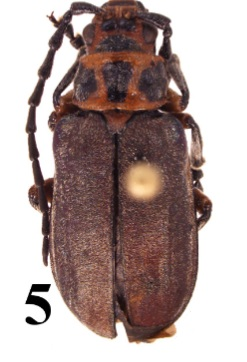
- Coraia maculicollis

Scientific classification
- Kingdom: Animalia
- Phylum: Arthropoda
- Clade: Pancrustacea
- Class: Insecta
- Order: Coleoptera
- Suborder: Polyphaga
- Infraorder: Cucujiformia
- Family: Chrysomelidae
- Subfamily: Galerucinae
- Tribe: Galerucini
- Genus: Coraia; H. Clark, 1865

Type species
- Coraia maculicollis H. Clark, 1865

= Coraia =

Genus of beetles

Coraia is a genus of skeletonizing leaf beetles in the family Chrysomelidae. There are at least four described species in Coraia. They are distributed from southern Texas to Central America.

== Species ==
These four species belong to the genus Coraia:

- Coraia apicicornis Jacoby, 1892
- Coraia clarki Jacoby, 1886
- Coraia maculicollis H. Clark, 1865
- Coraia subcyanescens (Schaeffer, 1906)
