= Habrophora =

Scientific classification
- Kingdom: Animalia
- Phylum: Arthropoda
- Clade: Pancrustacea
- Class: Insecta
- Order: Coleoptera
- Suborder: Polyphaga
- Infraorder: Cucujiformia
- Family: Chrysomelidae
- Subfamily: Eumolpinae
- Tribe: Habrophorini
- Genus: Habrophora; Erichson, 1847

Type species
- Habrophora lateralis Erichson, 1847

Genus of leaf beetles

Habrophora is a genus of leaf beetles in the subfamily Eumolpinae. It is distributed in Central America, South America, and the West Indies. It is placed in the tribe Habrophorini with the related genus Psathyrocerus.

== Species ==
- Habrophora altimontana Bechyné, 1951 – Peru
- Habrophora amazona Weise, 1921 – Brazil
- Habrophora annulicornis (Pic, 1923) – Guadeloupe
- Habrophora colorata Bechyné & Bechyné, 1961 – Brazil
- Habrophora costulata Lefèvre, 1885 – Brazil
- Habrophora elongata Bechyné, 1951 – Bolivia
- Habrophora fenestrata Bechyné, 1951 – Bolivia
- Habrophora fuscoornata (Clark, 1866) – Venezuela
- Habrophora gemella Monrós, 1952 – Argentina
- Habrophora gounellei (Pic, 1923) – Brazil
- Habrophora lateralis Erichson, 1847 – Peru
- Habrophora lineigera Bechyné, 1958 – Brazil
- Habrophora lineolata (Pic, 1923) – Argentina
- Habrophora maculipennis Jacoby, 1882 – Belize, Guatemala, Nicaragua, Costa Rica, Panama
- Habrophora maculosa (Pic, 1923) – Brazil
- Habrophora montana Jacoby, 1893 – Bolivia
- Habrophora mutila Monrós, 1952 – Bolivia
- Habrophora notaticeps (Pic, 1923) – Brazil
- Habrophora ornata Monrós, 1952 – Argentina
- Habrophora picturata Monrós, 1952 – Argentina
- Habrophora robusta (Pic, 1923) – Brazil
- Habrophora simplex Monrós, 1952 – Argentina
- Habrophora thelmae Blake, 1968 – Dominica
- Habrophora tibialis Lefèvre, 1878 – Colombia
- Habrophora varia Erichson, 1847 – Peru
- Habrophora viridicollis Jacoby, 1891 – Panama
- Habrophora wittmeri Bechyné, 1953 – Brazil
