= Cubispini =

- Lobispa callosa, Panama

Scientific classification
- Kingdom: Animalia
- Phylum: Arthropoda
- Clade: Pancrustacea
- Class: Insecta
- Order: Coleoptera
- Suborder: Polyphaga
- Infraorder: Cucujiformia
- Family: Chrysomelidae
- Subfamily: Eumolpinae
- Tribe: Cubispini; Monrós, 1954

Genera
- Cubispa; Lobispa

Tribe of leaf beetles

Cubispini is a tribe of leaf beetles from the Neotropical realm. It is classified within either the Eumolpinae or the Cassidinae. It was established by Francisco Monrós in 1954 to contain the genus Cubispa, which was originally placed in the subfamily Hispinae (now included in Cassidinae), in the tribe Cephaloleini. A second genus, Lobispa, was described and placed in the tribe by C.L. Staines in 2001.

According to Borowiec & Świętojańska (2014), the placement of the tribe Cubispini and the genus Cubispa is still uncertain, and they prefer to exclude Cubispa from Eumolpinae and retain it in Cassidinae.
