= Rhodopaea =

Scientific classification
- Kingdom: Animalia
- Phylum: Arthropoda
- Clade: Pancrustacea
- Class: Insecta
- Order: Coleoptera
- Suborder: Polyphaga
- Infraorder: Cucujiformia
- Family: Chrysomelidae
- Subfamily: Eumolpinae
- Tribe: Floricolini
- Genus: Rhodopaea; Gruev & Tomov, 1968

Type species
- Rhodopaea angelovi Gruev & Tomov, 1968

Synonyms
- Gruevia Warchałowski, 1974

Genus of leaf beetles

Rhodopaea (or Gruevia) is a genus of leaf beetles in the subfamily Eumolpinae. It originally contained only one species, Rhodopaea angelovi, which is paleoendemic to the western Rhodopes of Bulgaria. In 2019, a second species, Rhodopaea heinzi, was described from northwestern Anatolia in Turkey.

== Taxonomy ==
The genus Rhodopaea and the type species, R. angelovi, were originally described by Bulgarian entomologists Blagoy Gruev and Vasil Tomov in 1968. In 1974, Warchałowski suggested the generic name Gruevia, believing the name Rhodopaea to be preoccupied by a butterfly genus of the same name described by Achille Guenée in 1845. The name of the type species would therefore be Gruevia angelovi. However, it turned out the genus described by Guenée was actually called Rhodophaea, which was misspelled as Rhodopaea by Bytinski-Salz in 1938. Therefore, Rhodopaea angelovi remains the valid name for the type species.

Historically Rhodopaea was placed in the tribe Bromiini (or Adoxini); in the updated and revised edition of Catalogue of Palaearctic Coleoptera published in 2024, it was transferred to the new tribe Floricolini alongside the genus Floricola.

== Species ==
- Rhodopaea angelovi Gruev & Tomov, 1968
- Rhodopaea heinzi Kippenberg, 2019
