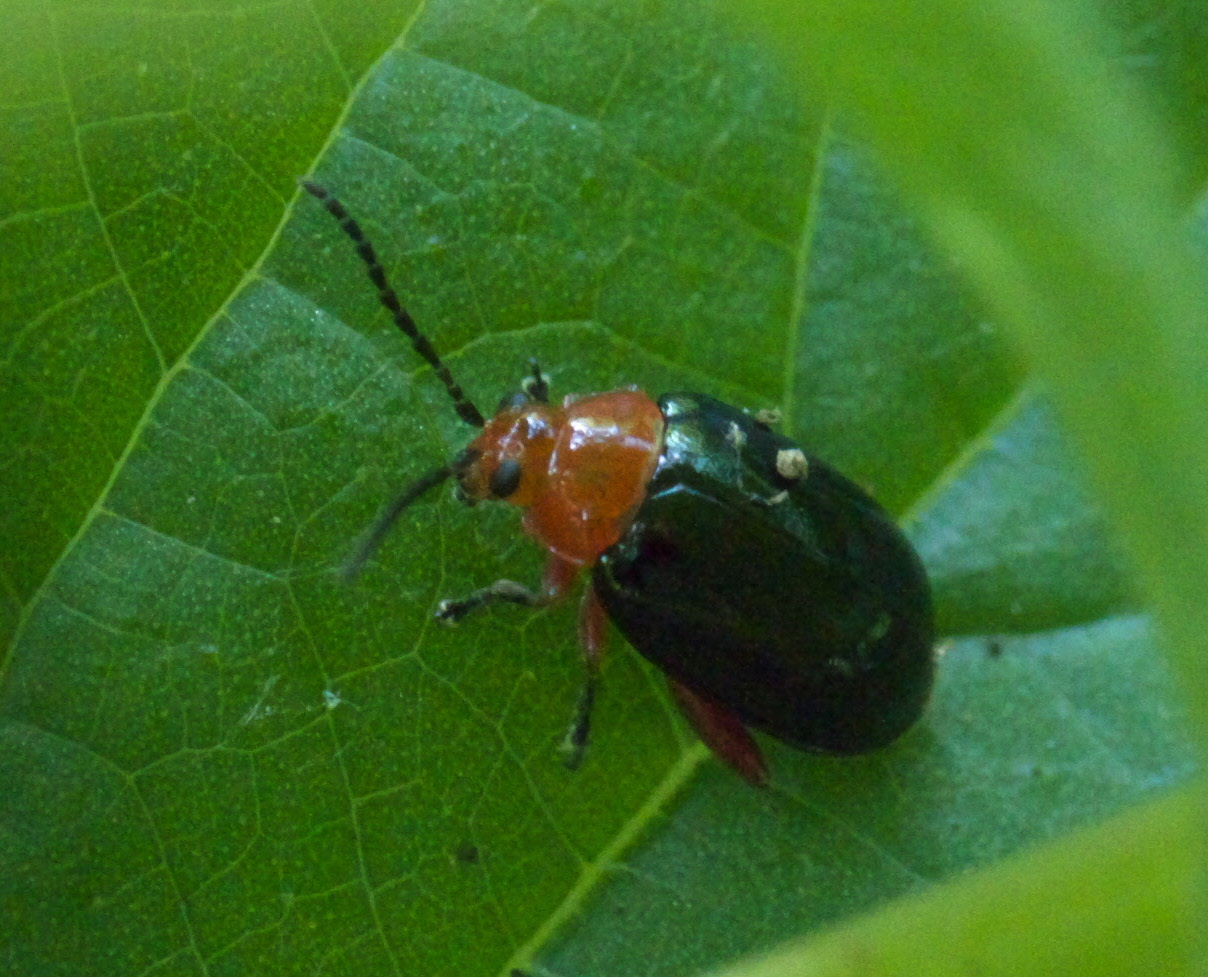
- Asphaera lustrans

Scientific classification
- Kingdom: Animalia
- Phylum: Arthropoda
- Class: Insecta
- Order: Coleoptera
- Suborder: Polyphaga
- Infraorder: Cucujiformia
- Superfamily: Chrysomeloidea
- Family: Chrysomelidae
- Subfamily: Galerucinae
- Tribe: Alticini
- Genus: Asphaera; Duponchel & Chevrolat, 1842

Type species
- Asphaera subfasciata Clark, 1865

Synonyms
- Ptena Chevrolat, 1836; Asphaera Chevrolat, 1836 (nomen nudum)

= Asphaera =

Genus of beetles

Asphaera is a genus of flea beetles in the family Chrysomelidae, containing some 130 species, found in North America, Central America, and the Neotropics.

== Selected species ==
- Asphaera abdominalis (Chevrolat, 1835)
- Asphaera bitaeniata (Jacoby, 1880)
- Asphaera cruciata (Olivier, 1808)
- Asphaera discicollis Jacoby, 1905
- Asphaera fuscofasciata Jacoby, 1905
- Asphaera lustrans (Crotch, 1873) (shiny flea beetle)
- Asphaera magistralis
- Asphaera meticulosa
- Asphaera nobilatata (Fabricius, 1887)
- Asphaera paralleloptera (Bezzi, 1913)
- Asphaera quadrifasciata
- Asphaera reflexicollis Bechyne
- Asphaera separata (Harold, 1881)
- Asphaera umbraticus (Olivier, 1808)
- Asphaera vernalis Jacoby, 1905
- Asphaera weyrauchi Bechyne

== Gallery ==
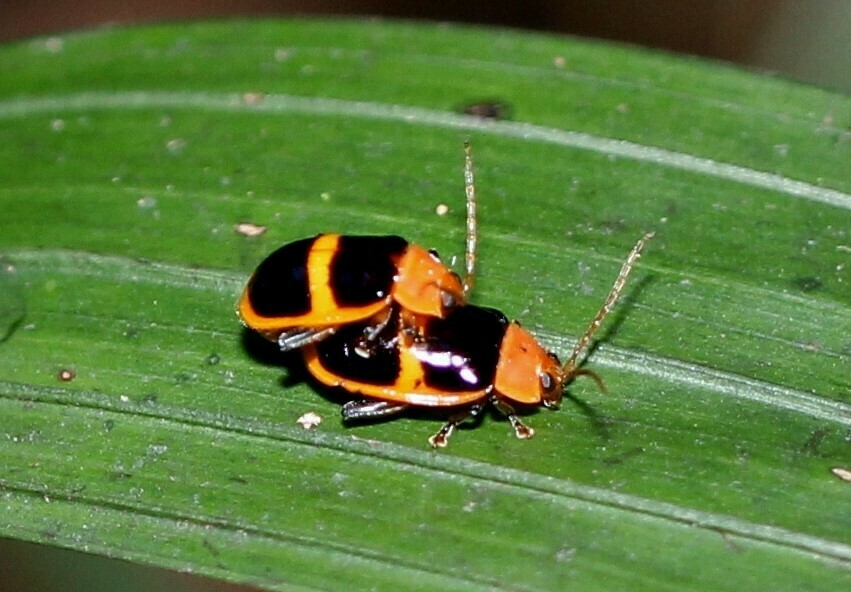
Asphaera paralleloptera
