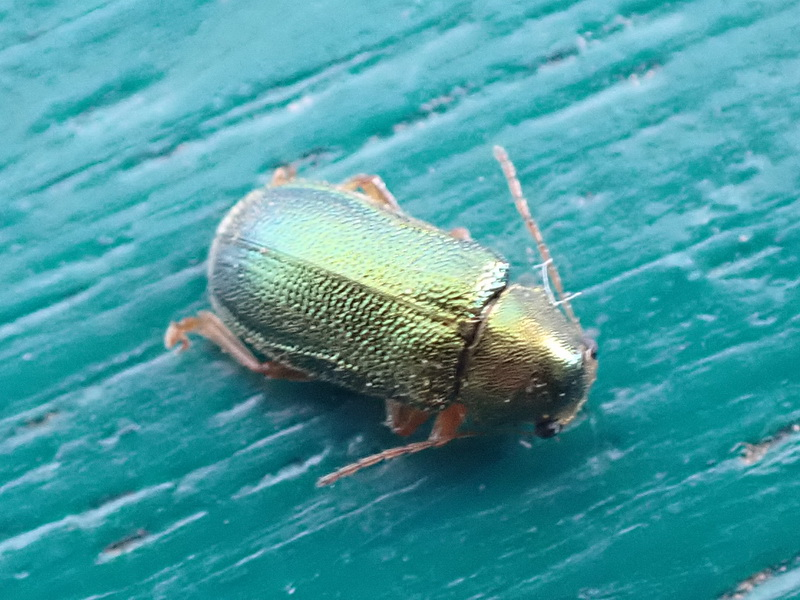

Scientific classification
- Kingdom: Animalia
- Phylum: Arthropoda
- Clade: Pancrustacea
- Class: Insecta
- Order: Coleoptera
- Suborder: Polyphaga
- Infraorder: Cucujiformia
- Family: Chrysomelidae
- Subfamily: Eumolpinae
- Tribe: Floricolini
- Genus: Floricola; Gistel, 1848
- Species: F. ulema

Binomial name
- Floricola ulema (Germar, 1813)

Synonyms
- Genus: Pales Chevrolat in Dejean, 1836 (nec Robineau-Desvoidy, 1830); Eupales Lefèvre, 1885; Species: Colaspis ulema Germar, 1813; Eupales ulema (Germar, 1813); Eupales ulema var. viridis Pic, 1916

= Floricola =

Genus of leaf beetles from Southeast Europe

Floricola (formerly Eupales) is a genus of leaf beetles in the subfamily Eumolpinae. The genus contains only one species, Floricola ulema, which is found in Southeast Europe, mostly in Hungary, the Balkan Peninsula, and Turkey. Floricola is recognised as a primitive member of Eumolpinae, and it shares some features with the Spilopyrinae.

== Taxonomy ==
The genus was originally known as Pales, named in 1836 by the French entomologist Louis Alexandre Auguste Chevrolat in Dejean's Catalogue des Coléoptères, but this name was preoccupied by the fly genus Pales Robineau-Desvoidy, 1830. Later, two replacement names for Pales were created: Floricola, created by Johannes von Nepomuk Franz Xaver Gistel in 1848, and Eupales, by Édouard Lefèvre in 1885. Floricola is the oldest name and therefore has priority over Eupales; however, almost all authors have used Eupales in the last 125 years.

In Verma et al. (2005), the genus was placed as the only member of a new tribe Eupalini. However, the name "Eupalini" was not explicitly indicated as new in the paper, so it is considered an unavailable name according to the International Code of Zoological Nomenclature. In the sixth volume of the Catalogue of Palaearctic Coleoptera and in Bouchard et al. (2011), the genus was placed as incertae sedis within Eumolpinae instead.

An application to the International Commission on Zoological Nomenclature was sent in 2009 to conserve both the names Eupales and Eupalini, but the case was never published.

In the updated and revised edition of the Catalogue of Palaearctic Coleoptera published in 2024, Floricola was used as the valid name of the genus instead of Eupales, and a new tribe Floricolini was established to contain both the genera Floricola and Rhodopaea.

== Description ==
The adult of F. ulema has an oblong body with a golden metallic green color and a light golden pubescence, and simple tarsal claws. Newly-born larvae are white-yellowish in color, and are completely blind, lacking even stemmata.

== Food plants ==
Floricola has been reported from two species of dogwoods, Cornus mas and Cornus sanguinea, as well as other plants such as Pyrus spp. In Hungary, it appears to be restricted to Cornus mas.
