= Chrysopida festiva =

Scientific classification
- Kingdom: Animalia
- Phylum: Arthropoda
- Clade: Pancrustacea
- Class: Insecta
- Order: Coleoptera
- Suborder: Polyphaga
- Infraorder: Cucujiformia
- Family: Chrysomelidae
- Genus: Chrysopida
- Species: C. festiva

Binomial name
- Chrysopida festiva Baly, 1861

Species of leaf beetles

Chrysopida festiva is a species of leaf beetle in the subfamily Eumolpinae found in Luzon and Negros in the Philippines.
