= Caryonoda =

Scientific classification
- Kingdom: Animalia
- Phylum: Arthropoda
- Class: Insecta
- Order: Coleoptera
- Suborder: Polyphaga
- Infraorder: Cucujiformia
- Family: Chrysomelidae
- Subfamily: Eumolpinae
- Tribe: Caryonodini; Bechyné, 1951
- Genus: Caryonoda; Bechyné, 1951

Type species
- Caryonoda kuscheli Bechyné, 1951

Genus of leaf beetles from South America

Caryonoda is a genus of leaf beetles in the subfamily Eumolpinae. It is considered either the only member of the tribe Caryonodini, or a member of the tribe Eumolpini. It contains six species from South America, and a single species from Nicaragua.

== Species ==
The genus includes the following species:

- Caryonoda bisinuata Bechyné & Bechyné, 1961 – Brazil (Pará)
- Caryonoda campanulicollis Bechyné, 1951 – Bolivia
- Caryonoda funebris Gómez-Zurita & Maes, 2022 – Nicaragua
- Caryonoda kuscheli Bechyné, 1951 – Bolivia, Peru
- Caryonoda meridana Bechyné, 1953 – Venezuela
- Caryonoda pohli Bechyné, 1951 – Brazil (Amazonas)
- Caryonoda tibialis (Lefèvre, 1885) – Colombia
