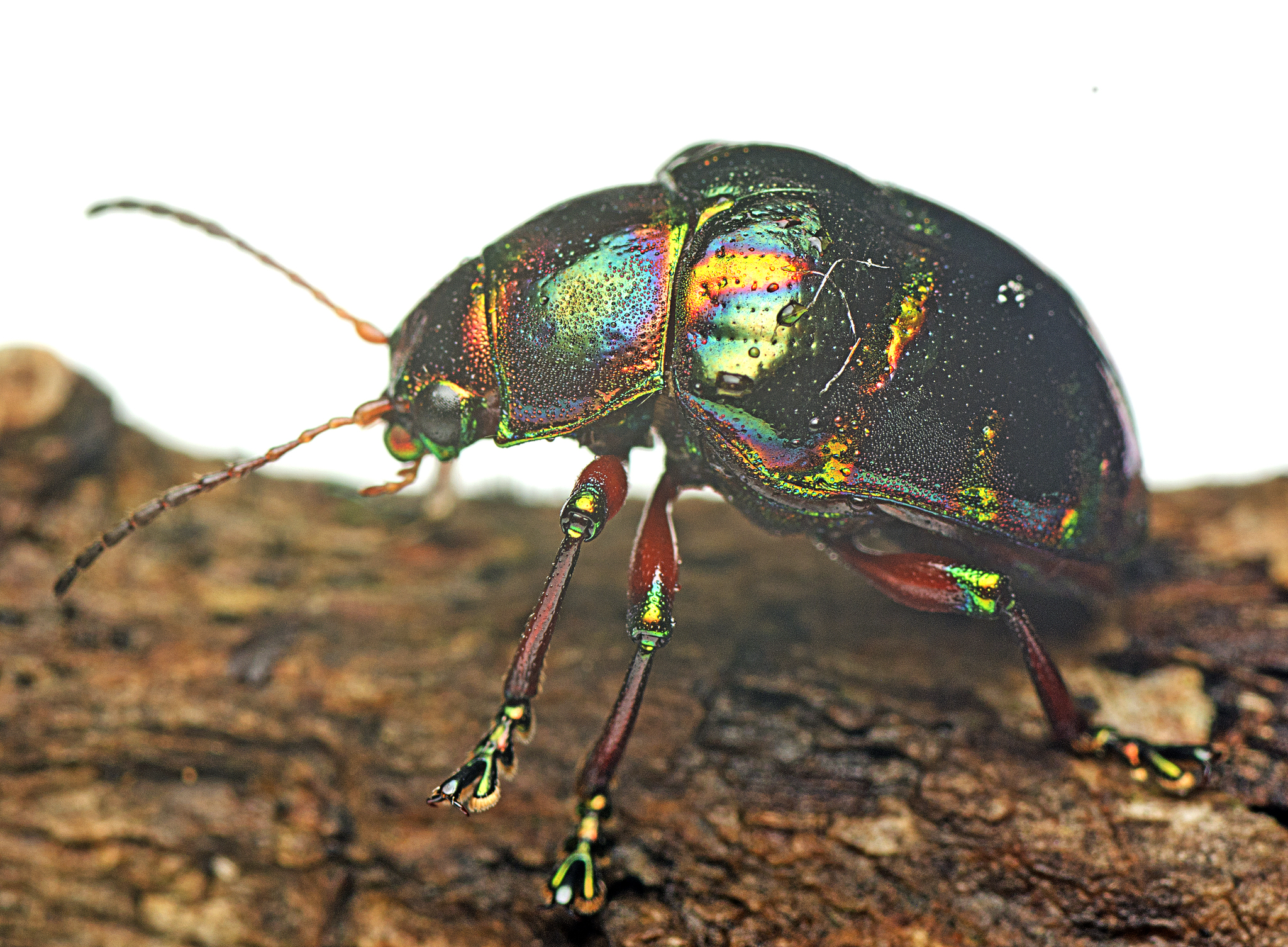
- Spilopyra sumptuosa

Scientific classification
- Domain: Eukaryota
- Kingdom: Animalia
- Phylum: Arthropoda
- Class: Insecta
- Order: Coleoptera
- Suborder: Polyphaga
- Infraorder: Cucujiformia
- Family: Chrysomelidae
- Subfamily: Spilopyrinae
- Genus: Spilopyra; Baly, 1860

Type species
- Spilopyra sumptuosa Baly, 1860

= Spilopyra =

Genus of leaf beetles from Australia and New Guinea

Spilopyra is a genus of leaf beetles in the subfamily Spilopyrinae. It is found in eastern Australia and New Guinea.

The genus is distinguished from other genera in Spilopyrinae by highly contrasting patterns of metallic color on its head, pronotum and elytra.

== Species ==
- Spilopyra safrina Reid & Beatson, 2010 – north Queensland
- Spilopyra scratchley Reid & Beatson, 2010 – eastern New Guinea
- Spilopyra semiramis Reid & Beatson, 2010 – central New Guinea
- Spilopyra stirlingi Lea, 1914 – north Queensland
- Spilopyra sumptuosa Baly, 1860 – central Queensland to northern New South Wales
