= Meroda =

Scientific classification
- Domain: Eukaryota
- Kingdom: Animalia
- Phylum: Arthropoda
- Class: Insecta
- Order: Coleoptera
- Suborder: Polyphaga
- Infraorder: Cucujiformia
- Family: Chrysomelidae
- Subfamily: Eumolpinae
- Tribe: Merodini; Chapuis, 1874
- Genus: Meroda; Baly, 1860

Type species
- Meroda costata Baly, 1860

Genus of leaf beetles from South America

Meroda is a genus of leaf beetles in the subfamily Eumolpinae. It is the only member of the tribe Merodini. It is distributed in the state of Amazonas in Brazil.

== Species ==
The genus includes the following species:

- Meroda costata Baly, 1860
- Meroda fulva Baly, 1861
- Meroda rufipennis Baly, 1861
