= Coelomera bajula =

Scientific classification
- Kingdom: Animalia
- Phylum: Arthropoda
- Clade: Pancrustacea
- Class: Insecta
- Order: Coleoptera
- Suborder: Polyphaga
- Infraorder: Cucujiformia
- Family: Chrysomelidae
- Genus: Coelomera
- Species: C. bajula

Binomial name
- Coelomera bajula Olivier, 1808

Species of beetle

Coelomera bajula is a species of beetle in the leaf beetle family (Chrysomelidae), native to Guyana. The scientific name of the species was published in 1808 by Guillaume-Antoine Olivier.
