= Coelomera opaca =

Scientific classification
- Kingdom: Animalia
- Phylum: Arthropoda
- Clade: Pancrustacea
- Class: Insecta
- Order: Coleoptera
- Suborder: Polyphaga
- Infraorder: Cucujiformia
- Family: Chrysomelidae
- Genus: Coelomera
- Species: C. opaca

Binomial name
- Coelomera opaca Bowditch, 1923

Species of beetles

Coelomera opaca is a species of beetle in the leaf beetle family (Chrysomelidae), native to Peru. The scientific name of the species was published in 1923 by Bowditch.
