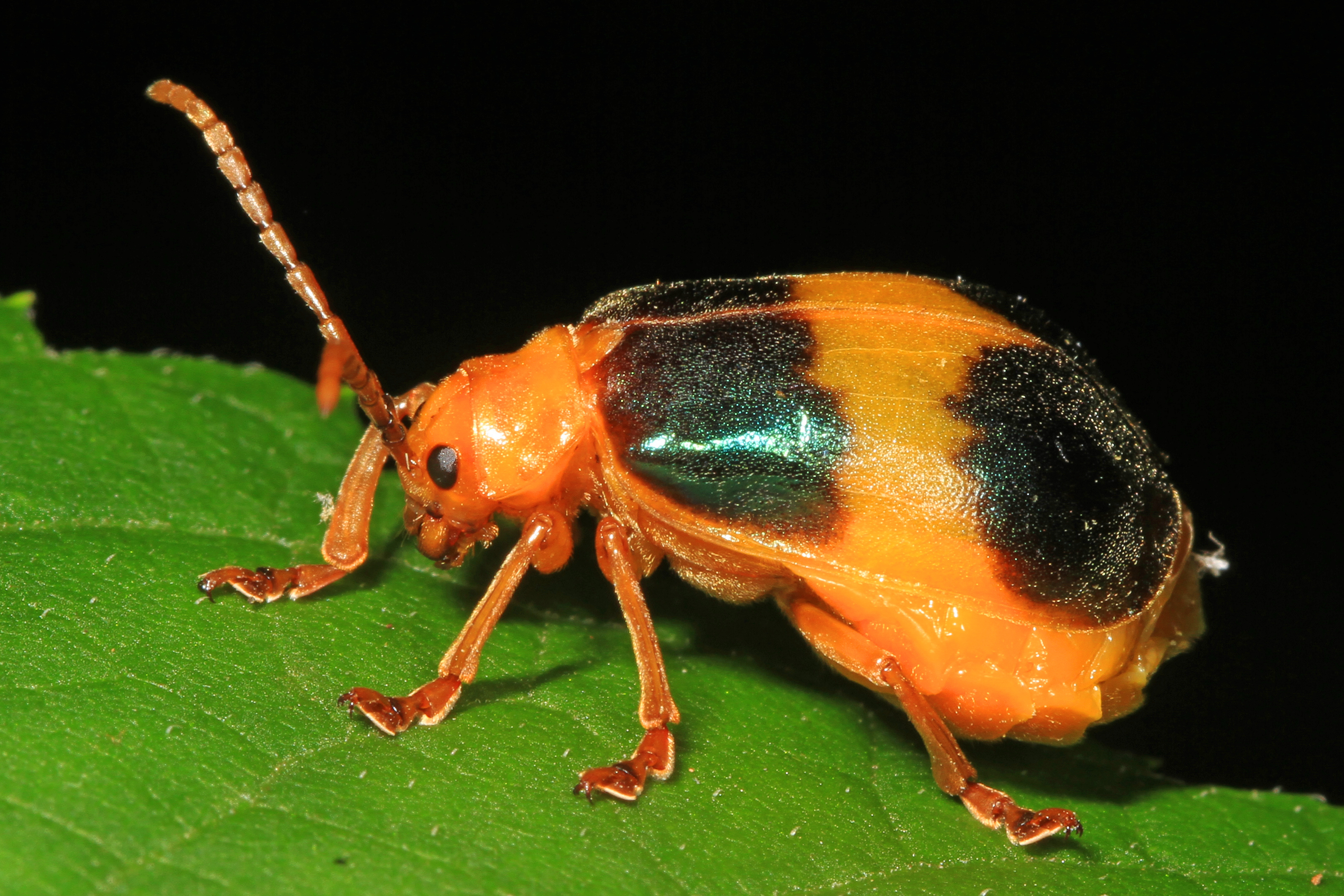

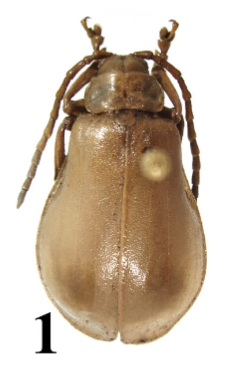

Scientific classification
- Kingdom: Animalia
- Phylum: Arthropoda
- Clade: Pancrustacea
- Class: Insecta
- Order: Coleoptera
- Suborder: Polyphaga
- Infraorder: Cucujiformia
- Family: Chrysomelidae
- Genus: Monocesta
- Species: M. coryli

Binomial name
- Monocesta coryli (Say, 1824)

Synonyms
- Galleruca coryli Say, 1824

= Monocesta coryli =

Species of beetle

Monocesta coryli, the larger elm leaf beetle, is a species of skeletonizing leaf beetle in the family Chrysomelidae. It is found in eastern and southeastern North America, from Florida west to Kansas and north to Pennsylvania. It is the only species of the large neotropical genus Monocesta known to be found in the United States. Its specific epithet refers to its feeding on hazels (Corylus species), though it feeds and lives primarily on elms (Ulmus species). Adults are easily identified by their relatively large size (10 to 16 mm) and orange coloration with metallic blue-green spots, though they may also have brown spots or no spots.

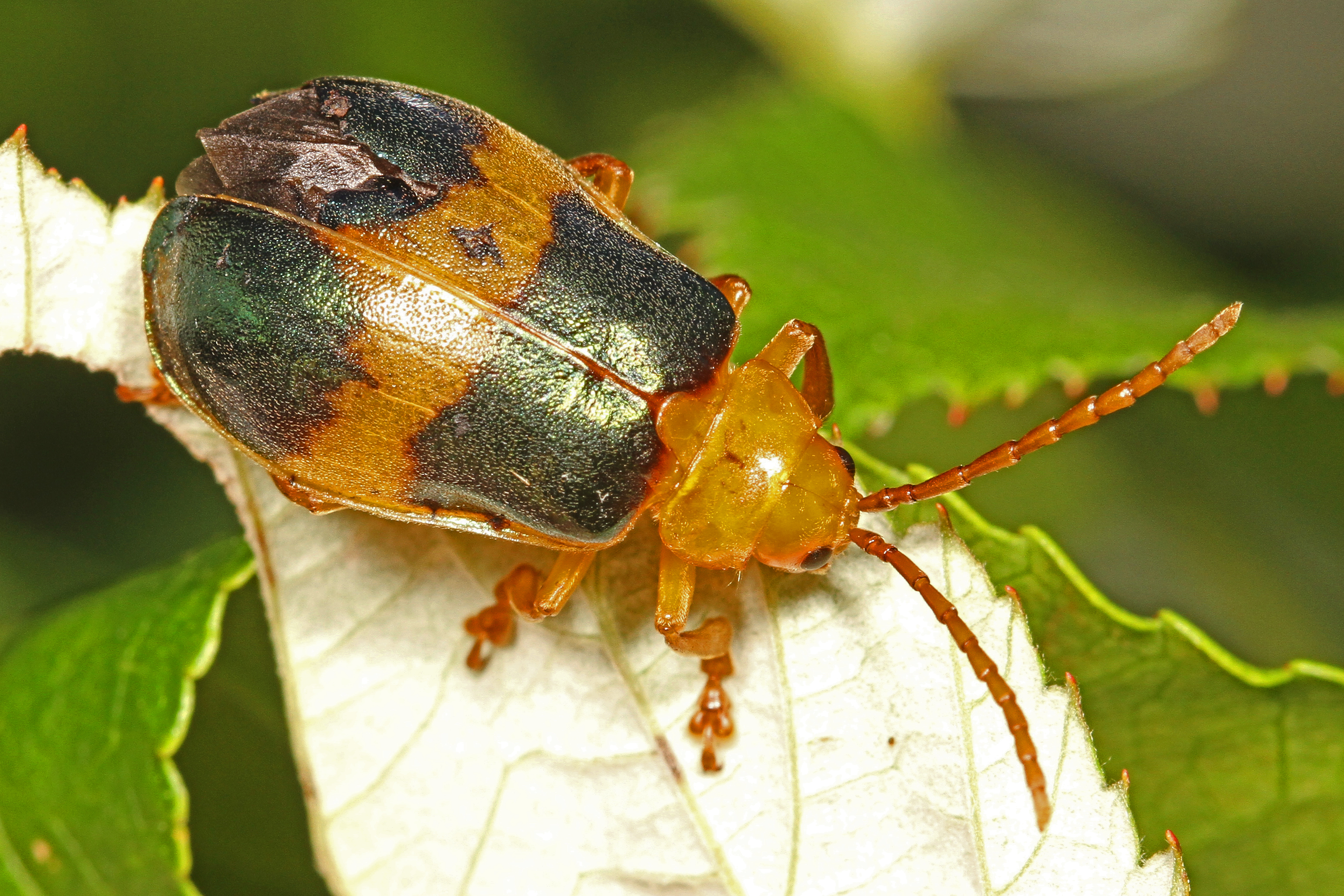
Larger elm leaf beetle, Monocesta coryli
