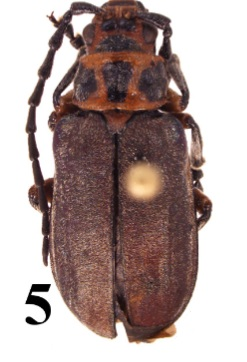

Scientific classification
- Kingdom: Animalia
- Phylum: Arthropoda
- Clade: Pancrustacea
- Class: Insecta
- Order: Coleoptera
- Suborder: Polyphaga
- Infraorder: Cucujiformia
- Family: Chrysomelidae
- Genus: Coraia
- Species: C. maculicollis

Binomial name
- Coraia maculicollis Clark, 1865

= Coraia maculicollis =

Species of beetle

Coraia maculicollis is a species of beetle of the family Chrysomelidae. It is found in Guatemala.
