= Coelomera azureofasciata =

Scientific classification
- Kingdom: Animalia
- Phylum: Arthropoda
- Clade: Pancrustacea
- Class: Insecta
- Order: Coleoptera
- Suborder: Polyphaga
- Infraorder: Cucujiformia
- Family: Chrysomelidae
- Genus: Coelomera
- Species: C. azureofasciata

Binomial name
- Coelomera azureofasciata Blanchard, 1843

Species of beetle

Coelomera azureofasciata is a species of beetle in the family Chrysomelidae, native to Bolivia. This species was scientifically described by Blanchard in 1843.
