= Coelomera maculicollis =

Scientific classification
- Kingdom: Animalia
- Phylum: Arthropoda
- Clade: Pancrustacea
- Class: Insecta
- Order: Coleoptera
- Suborder: Polyphaga
- Infraorder: Cucujiformia
- Family: Chrysomelidae
- Genus: Coelomera
- Species: C. maculicollis

Binomial name
- Coelomera maculicollis Clark, 1865

Species of beetles

Coelomera maculicollis is a species of beetle in the leaf beetle family (Chrysomelidae), native to Honduras. The scientific name of the species was published in 1865 by Clark.
