= Psathyrocerus =

Scientific classification
- Kingdom: Animalia
- Phylum: Arthropoda
- Clade: Pancrustacea
- Class: Insecta
- Order: Coleoptera
- Suborder: Polyphaga
- Infraorder: Cucujiformia
- Family: Chrysomelidae
- Subfamily: Eumolpinae
- Tribe: Habrophorini
- Genus: Psathyrocerus; Blanchard, 1851

Type species
- Psathyrocerus fulvipes Blanchard, 1851

Synonyms
- Psatyrocerus Clavareau, 1913; Lio Monrós, 1949

Genus of leaf beetles

Psathyrocerus is a genus of leaf beetles in the subfamily Eumolpinae. It is distributed in South America. It is placed in the tribe Habrophorini with the related genus Habrophora.

== Species ==
- Psathyrocerus curtus (Lacordaire, 1845) – Chile, Uruguay (error?)
- Psathyrocerus cyanipennis Clark, 1866 – Brazil (Rio de Janeiro)
- Psathyrocerus fulvipes Blanchard, 1851 – Chile
- Psathyrocerus oblongus (Blanchard, 1851) – Chile
- Psathyrocerus pallipes Blanchard, 1851 – Chile
- Psathyrocerus unicolor (Blanchard, 1851) – Chile
- Psathyrocerus variegatus Blanchard, 1851 – Chile

Synonyms:

- Psathyrocerus cinerascens Blanchard, 1851: synonym of Psathyrocerus curtus (Lacordaire, 1845)

Species transferred to other genera:

- Psathyrocerus fuscoornatus Clark, 1866: moved to Habrophora
