= Coelomera buckleyi =

Scientific classification
- Kingdom: Animalia
- Phylum: Arthropoda
- Clade: Pancrustacea
- Class: Insecta
- Order: Coleoptera
- Suborder: Polyphaga
- Infraorder: Cucujiformia
- Family: Chrysomelidae
- Genus: Coelomera
- Species: C. buckleyi

Binomial name
- Coelomera buckleyi Joseph, 1880

Species of beetles

Coelomera buckleyi is a species of beetle in the leaf beetle family (Chrysomelidae), native to Ecuador. The scientific name of the species was published in 1880 by Joseph.
