= Allsortsia =

Scientific classification
- Kingdom: Animalia
- Phylum: Arthropoda
- Clade: Pancrustacea
- Class: Insecta
- Order: Coleoptera
- Suborder: Polyphaga
- Infraorder: Cucujiformia
- Family: Chrysomelidae
- Subfamily: Spilopyrinae
- Genus: Allsortsia; Reid & Beatson, 2010
- Species: A. maculata

Binomial name
- Allsortsia maculata (Lea, 1922)

Synonyms
- Macrogonus maculatus Lea, 1922

Genus of leaf beetles from Australia

Allsortsia is a genus of leaf beetles in the subfamily Spilopyrinae. It contains only one species, Allsortsia maculata. It is found only in Australia, in the tropical rainforest of north Queensland.

The genus is named after liquorice allsorts, which A. maculata vaguely resembles.

A. maculata is known only from two type specimens collected in 1909 from Kuranda, adjacent to the Wet Tropics.
