= Dorymolpus =

Scientific classification
- Kingdom: Animalia
- Phylum: Arthropoda
- Clade: Pancrustacea
- Class: Insecta
- Order: Coleoptera
- Suborder: Polyphaga
- Infraorder: Cucujiformia
- Family: Chrysomelidae
- Subfamily: Spilopyrinae
- Genus: Dorymolpus; Elgueta, Daccordi & Zoia, 2014
- Species: D. elizabethae

Binomial name
- Dorymolpus elizabethae Elgueta, Daccordi & Zoia, 2014

Genus of leaf beetles from Chile

Dorymolpus is a genus of leaf beetles in the subfamily Spilopyrinae. It contains only one species, Dorymolpus elizabethae. It is found only in Chile, in the Valdivian temperate rain forest of the Valdivia and Chiloé provinces.

The generic name comes from the Greek dory ("spear") and molpus, a contraction of "Eumolpinae". The species is dedicated to Dr. Elizabeth Arias, an entomologist at the University of California, Berkeley who collected specimens of the species.

Both adults and larvae have been found on trees in the genus Nothofagus.
