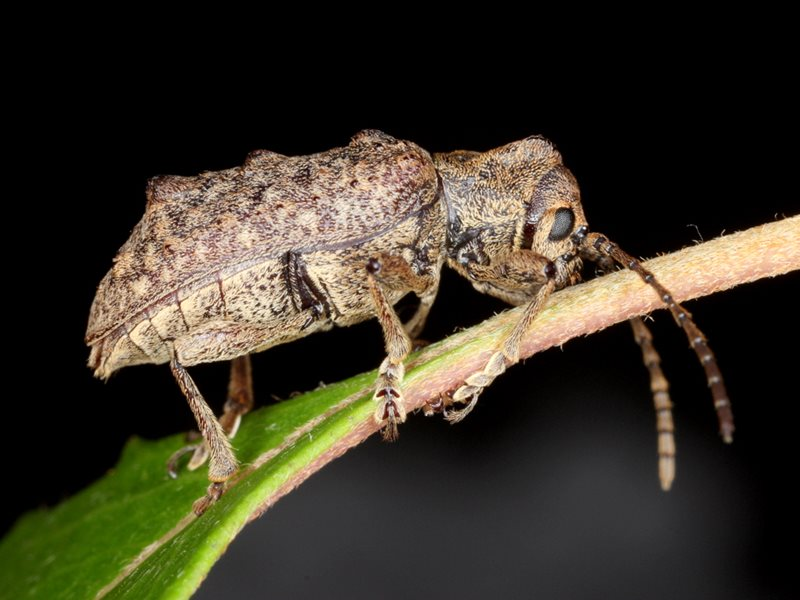
- Cheiloxena frenchae

Scientific classification
- Kingdom: Animalia
- Phylum: Arthropoda
- Clade: Pancrustacea
- Class: Insecta
- Order: Coleoptera
- Suborder: Polyphaga
- Infraorder: Cucujiformia
- Family: Chrysomelidae
- Subfamily: Spilopyrinae
- Genus: Cheiloxena; Baly, 1860

Type species
- Cheiloxena westwoodii Baly, 1860

Synonyms
- Chiloxena Gemminger & von Harold, 1874 (misspelling); Cheiloscena Selman, 1963 (misspelling); Chiloscena Selman, 1963 (misspelling)

= Cheiloxena =

Genus of leaf beetles from Australia

Cheiloxena is a genus of leaf beetles in the subfamily Spilopyrinae. It is endemic to Australia, occurring from southern Victoria to central Queensland.

== Species ==
- Cheiloxena aitori Reid & Beatson, 2018
- Cheiloxena blackburni Reid, 1992
- Cheiloxena conani Reid & Beatson, 2018
- Cheiloxena frenchae Blackburn, 1893
- Cheiloxena insignis Blackburn, 1896
- Cheiloxena monga Reid & Beatson, 2018
- Cheiloxena tuberosa Reid, 1992
- Cheiloxena westwoodii Baly, 1860
