= Megascelis texana =

Scientific classification
- Domain: Eukaryota
- Kingdom: Animalia
- Phylum: Arthropoda
- Class: Insecta
- Order: Coleoptera
- Suborder: Polyphaga
- Infraorder: Cucujiformia
- Family: Chrysomelidae
- Genus: Megascelis
- Species: M. texana

Binomial name
- Megascelis texana Linell, 1897

Species of beetle

Megascelis texana is a species of leaf beetle. It is found in North America.
