= Habrophorini =

Scientific classification
- Kingdom: Animalia
- Phylum: Arthropoda
- Clade: Pancrustacea
- Class: Insecta
- Order: Coleoptera
- Suborder: Polyphaga
- Infraorder: Cucujiformia
- Family: Chrysomelidae
- Subfamily: Eumolpinae
- Tribe: Habrophorini; Bechyné & Špringlová de Bechyné, 1969

Genera
- Habrophora; Psathyrocerus

Tribe of leaf beetles

Habrophorini is a tribe of leaf beetles in the subfamily Eumolpinae. It was first established in 1969 by Czech entomologists Jan Bechyné and Bohumila Špringlová de Bechyné for two genera, Habrophora and Psathyrocerus. They are distributed in the Neotropical realm.
