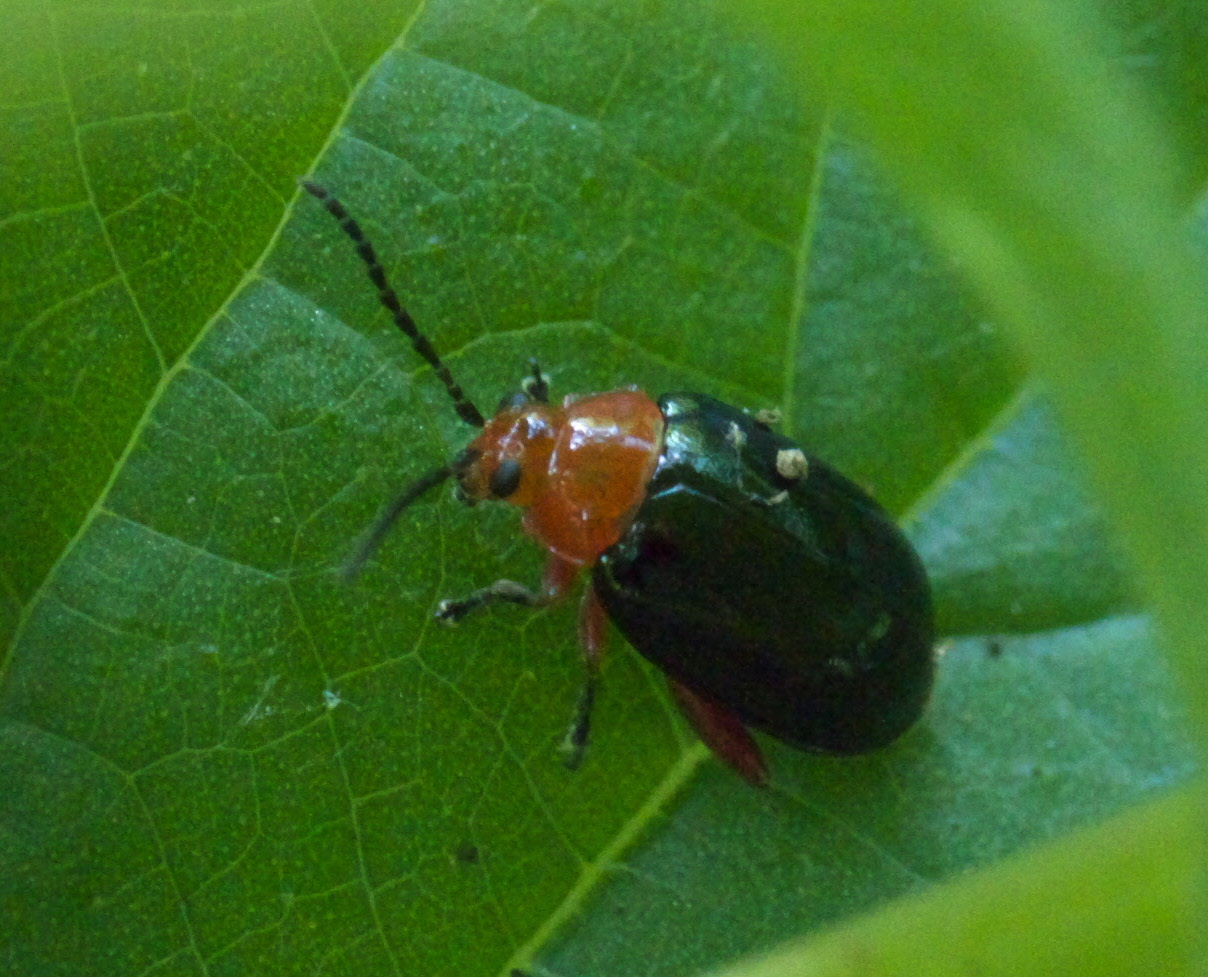

Scientific classification
- Kingdom: Animalia
- Phylum: Arthropoda
- Class: Insecta
- Order: Coleoptera
- Suborder: Polyphaga
- Infraorder: Cucujiformia
- Family: Chrysomelidae
- Tribe: Alticini
- Genus: Asphaera
- Species: A. lustrans

Binomial name
- Asphaera lustrans (Crotch, 1873)

= Asphaera lustrans =

Species of beetle

Asphaera lustrans, the shiny flea beetle, is a species of flea beetle in the family Chrysomelidae. It is found in Central America and North America.
