= Pygomolpus =

Scientific classification
- Domain: Eukaryota
- Kingdom: Animalia
- Phylum: Arthropoda
- Class: Insecta
- Order: Coleoptera
- Suborder: Polyphaga
- Infraorder: Cucujiformia
- Family: Chrysomelidae
- Subfamily: Eumolpinae
- Tribe: Pygomolpini; Bechyné, 1949
- Genus: Pygomolpus; Bechyné, 1949
- Species: P. opacus

Binomial name
- Pygomolpus opacus Bechyné, 1949

Genus of leaf beetles from South America

Pygomolpus is a genus of leaf beetles in the subfamily Eumolpinae. It contains only one species, Pygomolpus opacus, and is the only member of the tribe Pygomolpini. It was described by the Czech entomologist Jan Bechyné in 1949. It is found in Brazil, Paraguay and Argentina.
