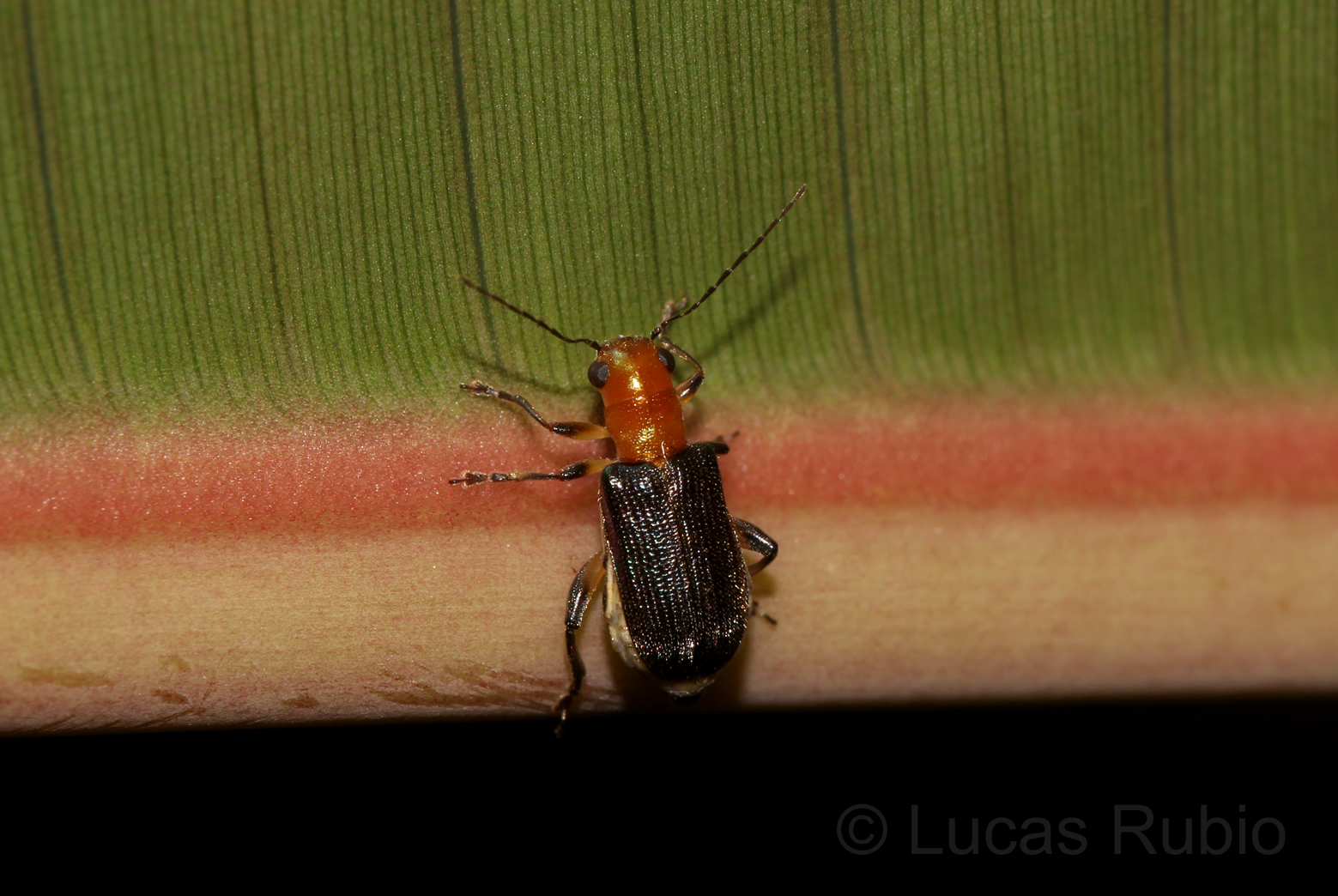
- Megascelis caeruleipennis

Scientific classification
- Kingdom: Animalia
- Phylum: Arthropoda
- Clade: Pancrustacea
- Class: Insecta
- Order: Coleoptera
- Suborder: Polyphaga
- Infraorder: Cucujiformia
- Family: Chrysomelidae
- Subfamily: Eumolpinae
- Tribe: Megascelidini; Chapuis, 1874

Genera
- Mariamela; Megascelis

= Megascelidini =

Tribe of leaf beetles

Megascelidini is a tribe of leaf beetles in the subfamily Eumolpinae. It contains two genera, Megascelis and Mariamela, which are found in the New World. Historically, the group was classified as a separate subfamily.
