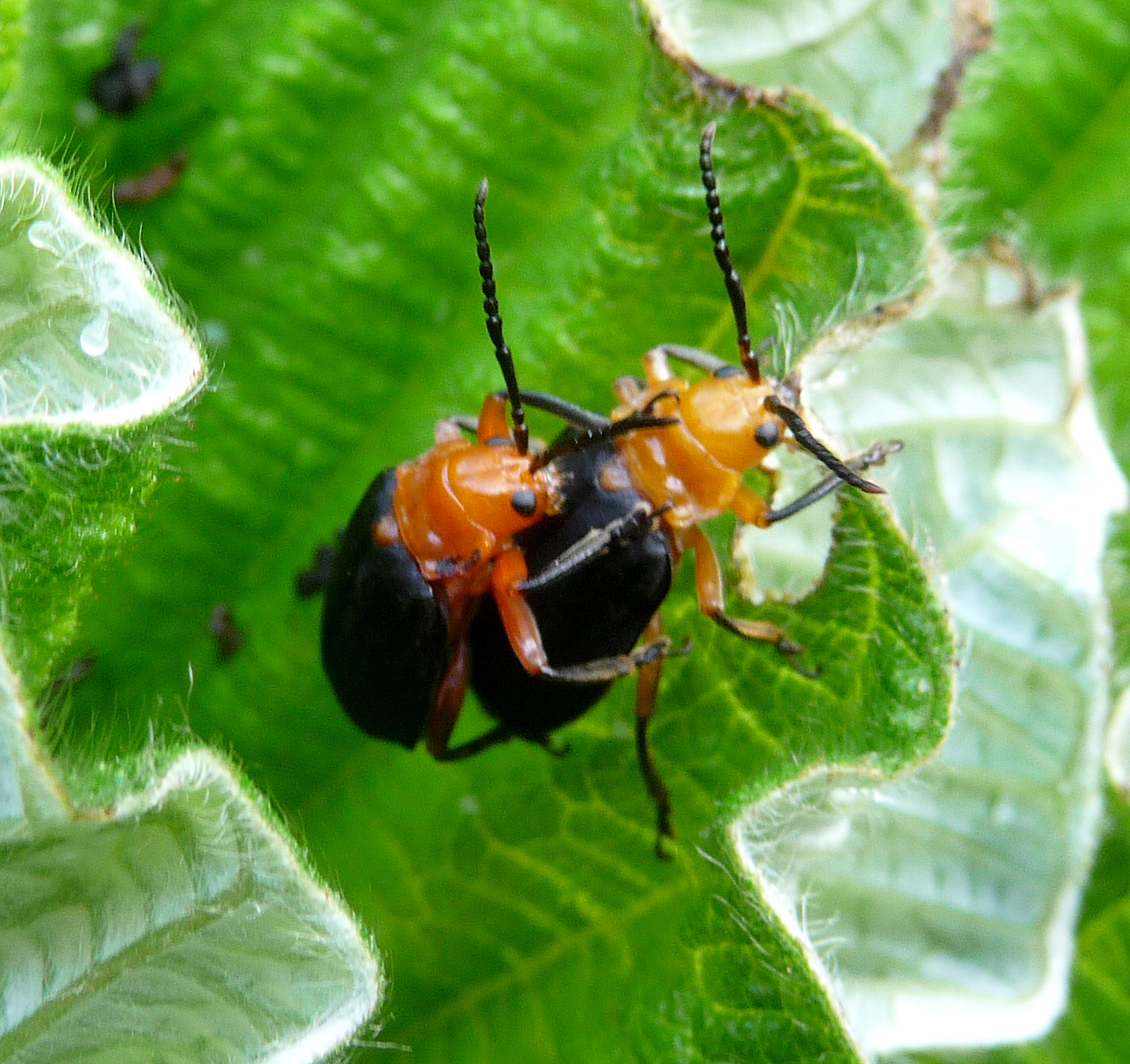
- Coelomera cajennensis

Scientific classification
- Kingdom: Animalia
- Phylum: Arthropoda
- Clade: Pancrustacea
- Class: Insecta
- Order: Coleoptera
- Suborder: Polyphaga
- Infraorder: Cucujiformia
- Family: Chrysomelidae
- Subfamily: Galerucinae
- Genus: Coelomera; Chevrolat in Dejean, 1836

Type species
- Chrysomela cajennensis Fabricius, 1787

= Coelomera =

Genus of leaf beetles

Coelomera is a genus of beetles belonging to the family Chrysomelidae.

The species of this genus are found in Central and South America.

Species:

- Coelomera atrocaerulea Jacoby, 1878
- Coelomera azureofasciata Blanchard, 1843
- Coelomera bajula (Olivier, 1808)
- Coelomera basalis Bechyné, 1956
- Coelomera binotata Clark, 1865
- Coelomera bipustulata Baly, 1865
- Coelomera boliviensis Kirsch, 1883
- Coelomera buckleyi Jacoby, 1880
- Coelomera cajennensis (Fabricius, 1787)
- Coelomera cinxia Baly, 1865
- Coelomera depressa (Clark, 1865)
- Coelomera godmani Jacoby, 1879
- Coelomera helenae Jolivet, 1987
- Coelomera jacobyi Bowditch, 1923
- Coelomera janthinipennis Bowditch, 1923
- Coelomera lanio (Dalman, 1823)
  - Coelomera lanio laeta Baly
  - Coelomera lanio lanio (Dalman, 1823)
- Coelomera maculicollis Clark, 1865
- Coelomera nigricollis Jacoby, 1879
- Coelomera olivieri Jacoby, 1886
- Coelomera opaca Bowditch, 1923
- Coelomera punctaticollis Jacoby, 1886
- Coelomera raquia Bechyné, 1956
- Coelomera ruficollis (Olivier, 1791)
- Coelomera ruficornis Baly, 1865
  - Coelomera ruficornis amazonica Bechyné & Springlová-Bechyné, 1970
  - Coelomera ruficornis ruficornis Baly, 1865
- Coelomera rufofusca Clark, 1865
- Coelomera submetallica Clark, 1865
- Coelomera tenuicornis Clark, 1865
- Coelomera tibialis Clark, 1865
- Coelomera weyrauchi Bechyné, 1956
