= Bohumiljania =

Scientific classification
- Kingdom: Animalia
- Phylum: Arthropoda
- Clade: Pancrustacea
- Class: Insecta
- Order: Coleoptera
- Suborder: Polyphaga
- Infraorder: Cucujiformia
- Family: Chrysomelidae
- Subfamily: Spilopyrinae
- Genus: Bohumiljania; Monrós, 1958

Type species
- Bohumiljania antiqua Monrós, 1958 (= Stenomela caledonica Jolivet, 1957)

Genus of leaf beetles from New Caledonia

Bohumiljania is a genus of leaf beetles in the subfamily Spilopyrinae. It is endemic to New Caledonia. It is named after Czech entomologist Bohumila Špringlová (married to fellow entomologist Jan Bechyně).

Bohumiljania measure 8–23 mm (0.31–0.91 in) in length. They show sexual size dimorphism: females are larger than males, with no size overlap.

== Species ==
There are nine accepted species:

- Bohumiljania aoupinie Reid & Beatson, 2011
- Bohumiljania caledonica (Jolivet, 1957)
- Bohumiljania humboldti Jolivet, Verma & Mille, 2005
- Bohumiljania lafoa Reid & Beatson, 2011
- Bohumiljania mandjelia Reid & Beatson, 2011
- Bohumiljania tango Reid & Beatson, 2011
- Bohumiljania xanthogramma Reid & Beatson, 2011
- Bohumiljania xaracuu Reid & Beatson, 2011
- Bohumiljania yuaga Reid & Beatson, 2011
