= Hemydacnini =

Scientific classification
- Kingdom: Animalia
- Phylum: Arthropoda
- Clade: Pancrustacea
- Class: Insecta
- Order: Coleoptera
- Suborder: Polyphaga
- Infraorder: Cucujiformia
- Family: Chrysomelidae
- Subfamily: Eumolpinae
- Tribe: Hemydacnini; Bechyné, 1951

Genera
- Colasita; Hemydacne

Tribe of leaf beetles

Hemydacnini is a tribe of leaf beetles in the subfamily Eumolpinae. It contains two genera, Hemydacne and Colasita, which are found in Madagascar.
