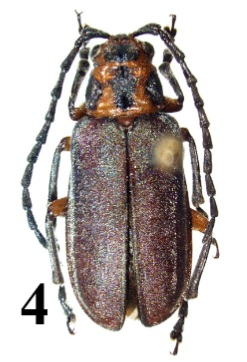

Scientific classification
- Kingdom: Animalia
- Phylum: Arthropoda
- Clade: Pancrustacea
- Class: Insecta
- Order: Coleoptera
- Suborder: Polyphaga
- Infraorder: Cucujiformia
- Family: Chrysomelidae
- Genus: Coraia
- Species: C. subcyanescens

Binomial name
- Coraia subcyanescens (Schaffer, 1906)

Synonyms
- Trirrhabda subcyanescens Schaeffer, 1906

= Coraia subcyanescens =

Species of beetle

Coraia subcyanescens, the coastal coyotillo leaf beetle, is a species of beetle of the family Chrysomelidae. It is found from southern Texas in the United States to northeastern Mexico. It inhabits coastal areas.

== Description ==
Adults reach a length of about 10 mm.

== Biology ==
It has been recorded feeding on Karwinskia humboldtiana.
