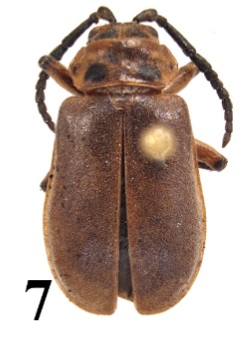

Scientific classification
- Kingdom: Animalia
- Phylum: Arthropoda
- Clade: Pancrustacea
- Class: Insecta
- Order: Coleoptera
- Suborder: Polyphaga
- Infraorder: Cucujiformia
- Family: Chrysomelidae
- Genus: Coelomera
- Species: C. godmani

Binomial name
- Coelomera godmani Jacoby, 1879

= Coelomera godmani =

Species of beetle

Coelomera godmani is a species of beetle of the family Chrysomelidae. It is found in Panama and Nicaragua. The scientific name of the species was published by Martin Jacoby in 1879.
