= Coelomera bipustulata =

Scientific classification
- Kingdom: Animalia
- Phylum: Arthropoda
- Clade: Pancrustacea
- Class: Insecta
- Order: Coleoptera
- Suborder: Polyphaga
- Infraorder: Cucujiformia
- Family: Chrysomelidae
- Genus: Coelomera
- Species: C. bipustulata

Binomial name
- Coelomera bipustulata Baly, 1865

Species of beetle

Coelomera bipustulata is a species of beetle in the leaf beetle family (Chrysomelidae), native to South America.

The species was first described in 1865 by English entomologist, Joseph Sugar Baly.
