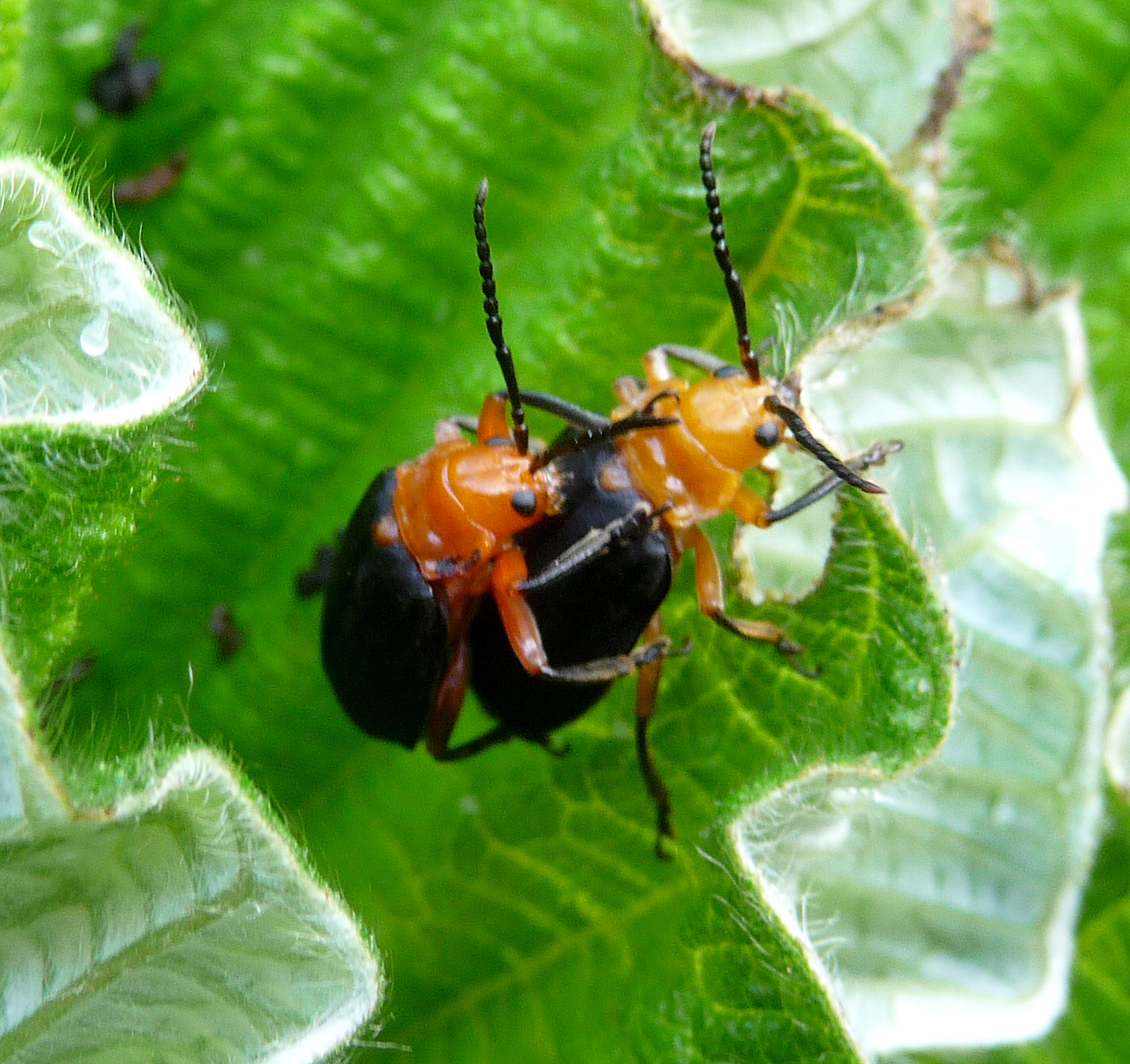

Scientific classification
- Kingdom: Animalia
- Phylum: Arthropoda
- Clade: Pancrustacea
- Class: Insecta
- Order: Coleoptera
- Suborder: Polyphaga
- Infraorder: Cucujiformia
- Family: Chrysomelidae
- Genus: Coelomera
- Species: C. cajennensis

Binomial name
- Coelomera cajennensis Fabricius, 1787

= Coelomera cajennensis =

Species of beetles

Coelomera cajennensis is a species of beetle in the leaf beetle family (Chrysomelidae). The scientific name of the species was published in 1787 by Johan Christian Fabricius.
