= Coelomera olivieri =

Scientific classification
- Kingdom: Animalia
- Phylum: Arthropoda
- Clade: Pancrustacea
- Class: Insecta
- Order: Coleoptera
- Suborder: Polyphaga
- Infraorder: Cucujiformia
- Family: Chrysomelidae
- Genus: Coelomera
- Species: C. olivieri

Binomial name
- Coelomera olivieri Jacoby, 1886

Species of beetle

Coelomera olivieri is a species of beetle in the leaf beetle family (Chrysomelidae), native to Guatemala. The scientific name of the species was published in 1886 by Jacoby.
