= Rosiroia =

Scientific classification
- Kingdom: Animalia
- Phylum: Arthropoda
- Clade: Pancrustacea
- Class: Insecta
- Order: Coleoptera
- Suborder: Polyphaga
- Infraorder: Cucujiformia
- Family: Chrysomelidae
- Subfamily: Eumolpinae
- Tribe: Rosiroiini; Bechyné, 1950
- Genus: Rosiroia; Bechyné, 1950
- Species: R. anisotomoides

Binomial name
- Rosiroia anisotomoides Bechyné, 1950

Genus of leaf beetles from Madagascar

Rosiroia is a genus of leaf beetles in the subfamily Eumolpinae, found in Madagascar. It contains only one species, Rosiroia anisotomoides, and is the only member of the tribe Rosiroiini. It was described by the Czech entomologist Jan Bechyně in 1950 from a single female specimen collected from the locality of Navana in November 1937. The genus was described as differing from all other known Eumolpinae by the front of its body, which resembles that of members of the family Leiodidae, such as Agathidium.

The genus is dedicated to Rosetta Roi (later Rosetta Kadlec), a taxidermist who worked with Bechyně at the Museum G. Frey, a private museum belonging to German entomologist and beetle collector Georg Frey.
