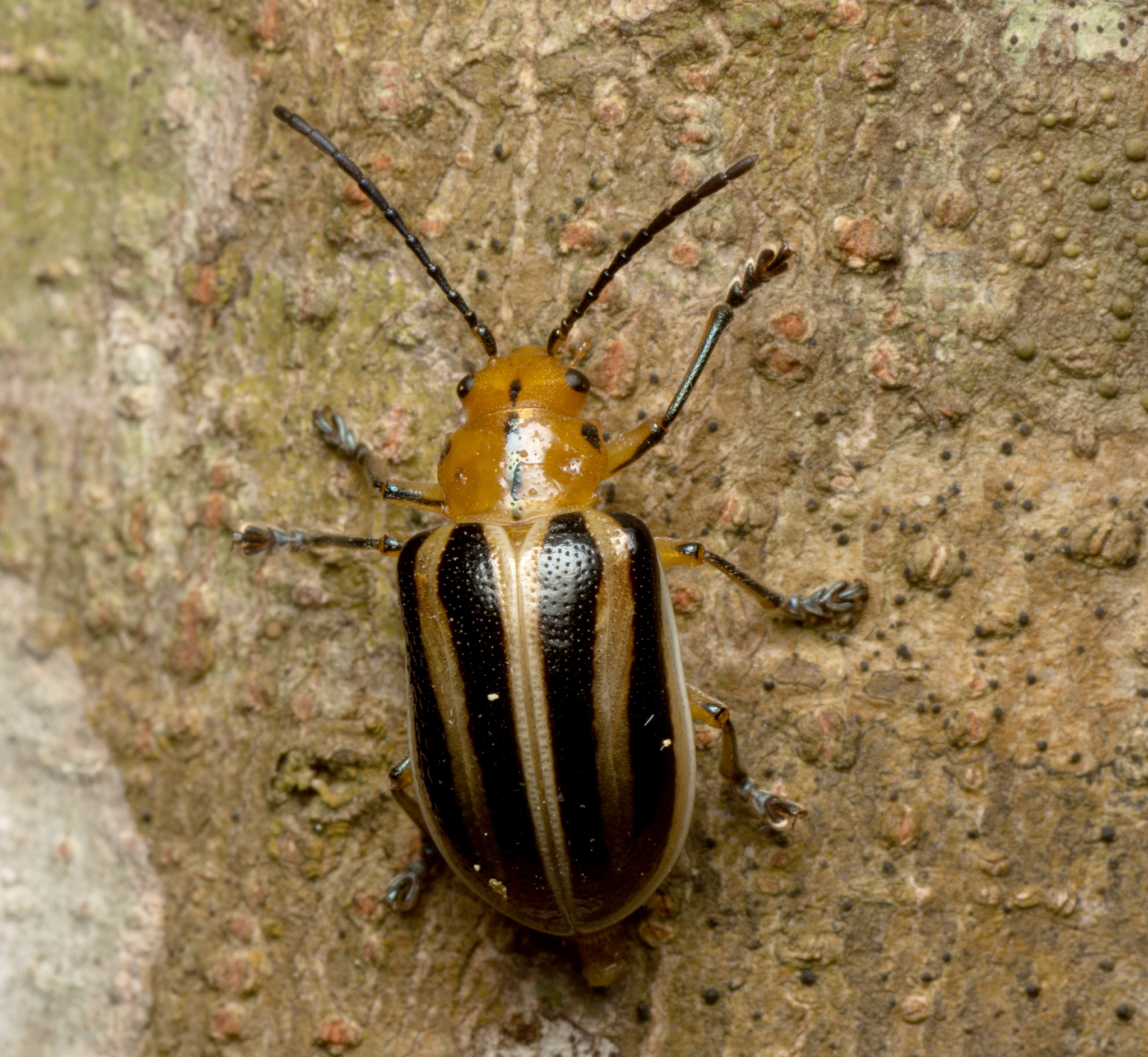
- Macrolema vittata

Scientific classification
- Kingdom: Animalia
- Phylum: Arthropoda
- Class: Insecta
- Order: Coleoptera
- Suborder: Polyphaga
- Infraorder: Cucujiformia
- Family: Chrysomelidae
- Subfamily: Spilopyrinae
- Genus: Macrolema; Baly, 1861

Type species
- Macrolema vittata Baly, 1861

Synonyms
- Macrogonus Jacoby, 1894

= Macrolema =

Genus of leaf beetles from Australia and New Guinea

Macrolema is a genus of leaf beetles in the subfamily Spilopyrinae. It is found in eastern Australia and New Guinea.

== Species ==
- Macrolema aenescens (Bowditch, 1913) – eastern New Guinea
- Macrolema albascutica Reid & Beatson, 2010 – north Queensland
- Macrolema atripennis (Bowditch, 1913) – south Queensland, north New South Wales
- Macrolema dickdaviesi Reid & Beatson, 2010 – north Queensland
- Macrolema giya Reid & Beatson, 2010 – central Queensland
- Macrolema karimui Reid & Beatson, 2010 – central New Guinea
- Macrolema longicornis Jacoby, 1895 – south Queensland, north New South Wales
- Macrolema metallica (Lea, 1922) – north Queensland
- Macrolema pulchra Reid & Beatson, 2010 – north Queensland
- Macrolema quadrivittata (Jacoby, 1898) – north Queensland
- Macrolema submetallica (Jacoby, 1894) – north Queensland
- Macrolema ventralis (Lea, 1921) – north New South Wales
- Macrolema vittata Baly, 1861 – south Queensland, north New South Wales
