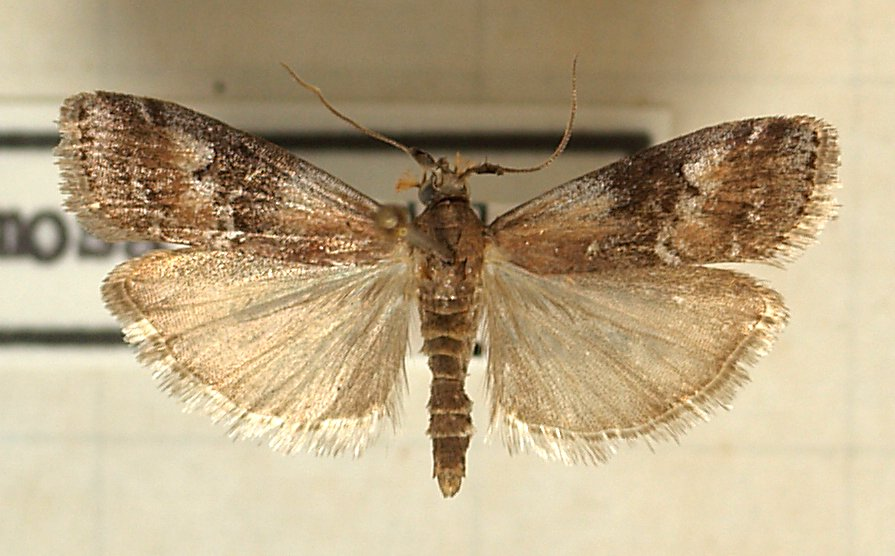

Scientific classification
- Kingdom: Animalia
- Phylum: Arthropoda
- Clade: Pancrustacea
- Class: Insecta
- Order: Lepidoptera
- Family: Pyralidae
- Genus: Rhodophaea
- Species: R. formosa

Binomial name
- Rhodophaea formosa (Haworth, 1811)

Synonyms
- Phycis formosa Haworth, 1811; Pempelia formosa

= Rhodophaea formosa =

Species of moth

Rhodophaea formosa is a moth of the family Pyralidae. It is found in most of Europe.

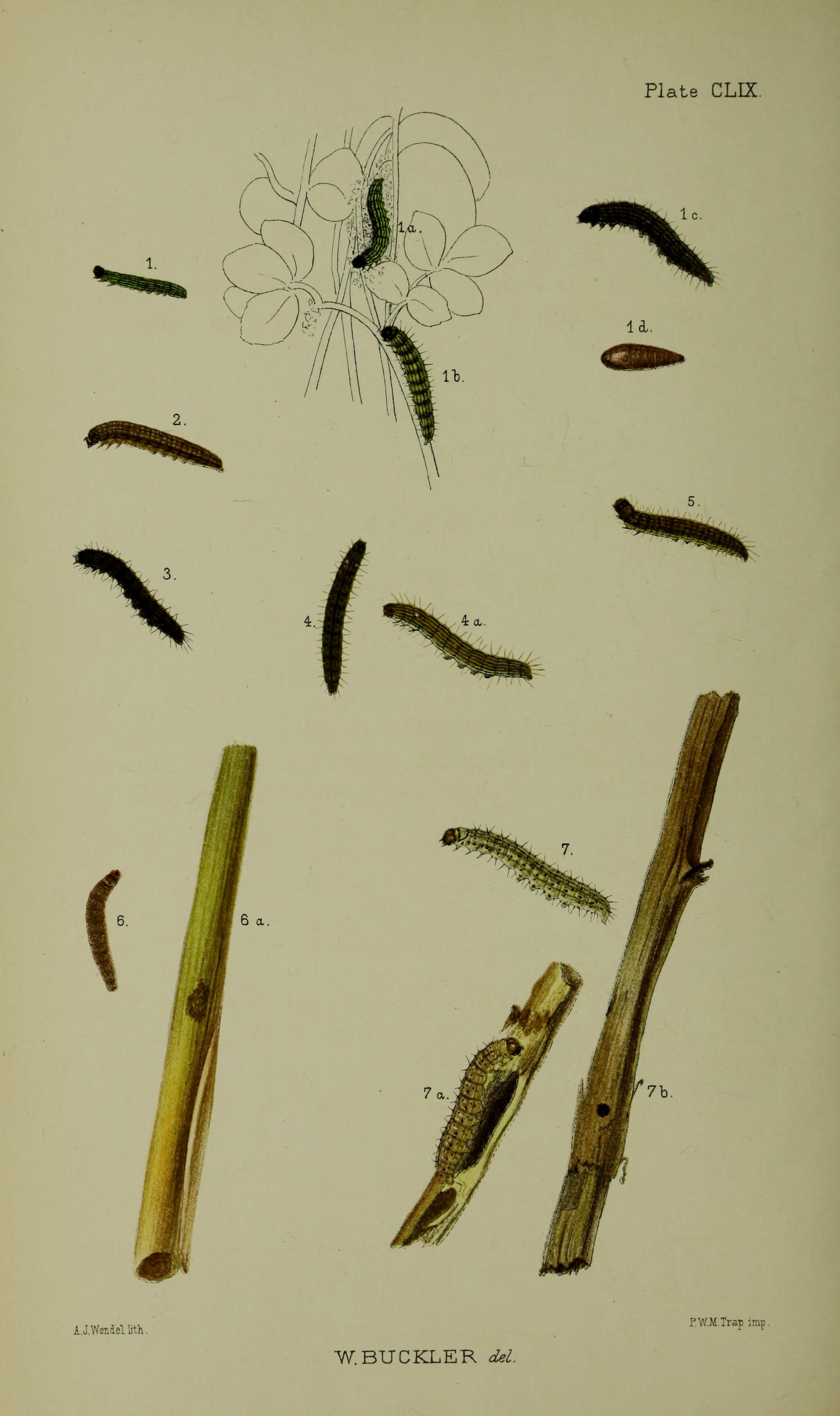
Fig. 4, 4a larva after final moult

The wingspan is 20–23 millimetres (0.79–0.91 in). The moth flies in one generation from July to August.

The larvae feed on elm.

== Notes ==
1. The flight season refers to Belgium and the Netherlands. This may vary in other parts of the range.
