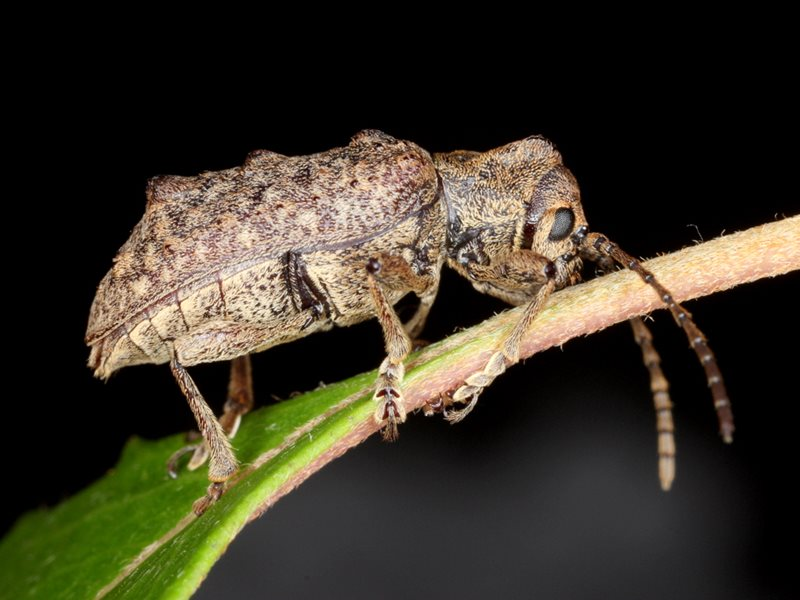
- Cheiloxena frenchae

Scientific classification
- Domain: Eukaryota
- Kingdom: Animalia
- Phylum: Arthropoda
- Class: Insecta
- Order: Coleoptera
- Suborder: Polyphaga
- Infraorder: Cucujiformia
- Family: Chrysomelidae
- Subfamily: Spilopyrinae; Chapuis, 1874

Synonyms
- Stenomelini Chapuis, 1874; Hornibiinae Crowson, 1946

= Spilopyrinae =

Subfamily of beetles

The Spilopyrinae are a small subfamily of the leaf beetles, or Chrysomelidae. They occur in Argentina, Australia, New Guinea, New Caledonia and Chile. They were formerly considered a tribe of the subfamily Eumolpinae. The group was elevated to subfamily rank by C. A. M. Reid in 2000. However, some authors have criticised this placement, preferring to retain them within the Eumolpinae.

== Genera ==
- Allsortsia Reid & Beatson, 2010 – Australia
- Bohumiljania Monrós, 1958 – New Caledonia
- Cheiloxena Baly, 1860 – Australia
- Dorymolpus Elgueta, Daccordi & Zoia, 2014 – Chile
- Hornius Fairmaire, 1885 – Argentina and Chile
- Macrolema Baly, 1861 – Australia and New Guinea
- Richmondia Jacoby, 1898 – Australia
- Spilopyra Baly, 1860 – Australia and New Guinea
- Stenomela Erichson, 1847 – Chile
