= Lobispa =

- Lobispa callosa, Panama

Scientific classification
- Kingdom: Animalia
- Phylum: Arthropoda
- Clade: Pancrustacea
- Class: Insecta
- Order: Coleoptera
- Suborder: Polyphaga
- Infraorder: Cucujiformia
- Family: Chrysomelidae
- Subfamily: Eumolpinae
- Tribe: Cubispini
- Genus: Lobispa; Staines, 2001

Type species
- Lobispa expansa Staines, 2001

Species
- Lobispa callosa; Lobispa expansa; Lobispa sentus

Genus of leaf beetles from the Neotropical realm

Lobispa is a genus of leaf beetles consisting of three species from Central America and northern South America. It is classified within the tribe Cubispini, which is placed within the subfamily Eumolpinae. The genus superficially resembles the subfamily Hispinae (now included in Cassidinae).

The genus name comes from lobus (Greek for "an elongated projection") plus -ispa from the subfamily name Hispinae.

== Species ==
There are three species included in Lobispa:

- Lobispa callosa (Baly, 1885) (= Cephalodonta callosa Baly, 1885 = Sceloenopla callosa (Baly, 1885)) – distributed from Costa Rica to Colombia
- Lobispa expansa Staines, 2001 – distributed from Panama to Venezuela
- Lobispa sentus Staines, 2001 – distributed from Costa Rica to Panama
