= Lobispa callosa =

- Lobispa callosa, Panama

Scientific classification
- Kingdom: Animalia
- Phylum: Arthropoda
- Clade: Pancrustacea
- Class: Insecta
- Order: Coleoptera
- Suborder: Polyphaga
- Infraorder: Cucujiformia
- Family: Chrysomelidae
- Genus: Lobispa
- Species: L. callosa

Binomial name
- Lobispa callosa (Baly, 1885)

Synonyms
- Cephalodonta callosa Baly, 1885; Sceloenopla callosa

Species of beetle

Lobispa callosa is a species of beetle of the family Chrysomelidae. It is found in Colombia, Costa Rica and Panama.

== Description ==
Adults reach a length of about 4.9–5.4 mm (0.19–0.21 in). The front is armed between the antennae with a short acute tooth. The antennae are more than half the length of the body, filiform and slightly thickened at the apex. The thorax is nearly one fourth longer than broad and subcylindrical, the sides nearly parallel, obsoletely angulate, the apical angle armed with a small obtuse tooth, coarsely punctured, slightly excavated transversely behind the middle. The disc has four ill-defined slightly raised callose vittae, extending from the base to the apex, the outer pair much less distinct and nearly obsolete on the hinder disc. The elytra are much broader than the thorax, oblong, parallel and rounded at the apex, above convex, flattened between the humeral calli, the latter strongly produced laterally, bicristate, acute. Each elytron has ten, at the extreme base with eleven, rows of large deeply impressed punctures, their interspaces with nine short, strongly raised, longitudinal ridges.
