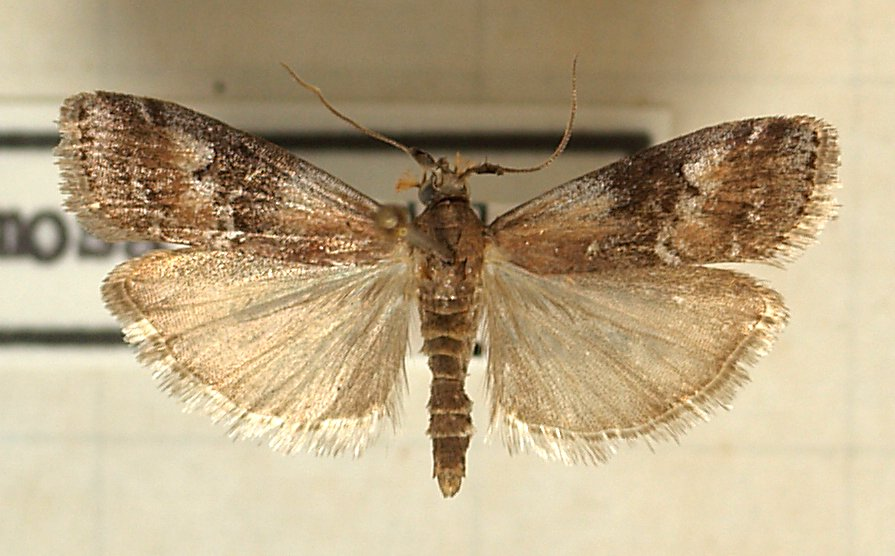
- Rhodophaea formosa

Scientific classification
- Kingdom: Animalia
- Phylum: Arthropoda
- Class: Insecta
- Order: Lepidoptera
- Family: Pyralidae
- Tribe: Phycitini
- Genus: Rhodophaea; Guenée, 1845

= Rhodophaea =

Genus of moths

Rhodophaea is a genus of moth of the family Pyralidae described by Achille Guenée in 1845. It is found in most of Europe and in India.

== Species ==
- Rhodophaea albirenalis Hampson, 1908 (India)
- Rhodophaea nigralbella Hampson, 1908 (India)
- Rhodophaea formosa (Haworth, 1811) (Europe, Russian Far East)
- Rhodophaea exotica (Inoue, 1959) (Japan, Korea, Russian Far East)
