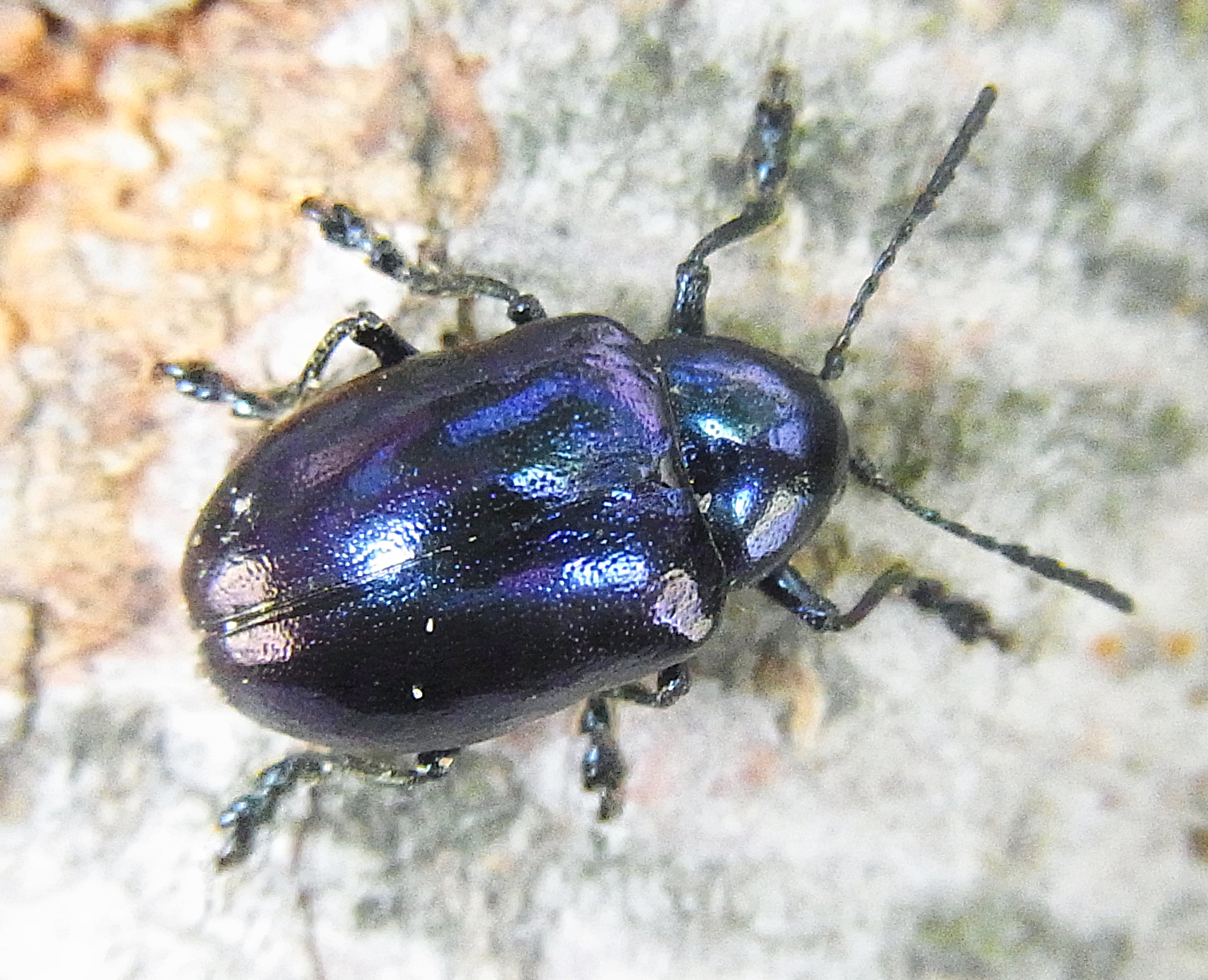
- Chrysochus asclepiadeus

Scientific classification
- Kingdom: Animalia
- Phylum: Arthropoda
- Clade: Pancrustacea
- Class: Insecta
- Order: Coleoptera
- Suborder: Polyphaga
- Infraorder: Cucujiformia
- Family: Chrysomelidae
- Subfamily: Eumolpinae; Hope, 1840

Tribes
- See text

Diversity
- More than 500 genera and 7000 species

= Eumolpinae =

Subfamily of leaf beetles

The Eumolpinae are a subfamily of the leaf beetles, or Chrysomelidae. It is one of the largest subfamilies of leaf beetles, including more than 500 genera and 7000 species. They are oval, and convex in form, and measure up to 10 mm in size. Typical coloration for this subfamily of beetles ranges from bright yellow to dark red. Many species are iridescent or brilliantly metallic blue or green in appearance.

== Description ==
Eumolpinae can be recognized at first sight by their rounded thoraces, more or less spherical or bell-shaped, but always significantly narrower than the mesothorax as covered by the elytra. Additional features include a small head set deeply into the thorax, and usually well-developed legs.

They generally resemble other Chrysomelidae, but differ in having front coxae rounded and third tarsal segment bilobed beneath. Many are metallic, or yellow and spotted. The dogbane beetle (Chrysochus auratus), for instance, is very attractive—iridescent blue-green with a coppery tinge, it measures 8–10 mm, and is found on dogbane and milkweed. Some, such as members of the genus Macrocoma, are unusually setaceous and with unusually prominent mandibles for members of the family Chrysomelidae.

== Distribution ==
The Eumolpinae are distributed worldwide. They are numerous in the tropics and subtropics, particularly in South America, tropical Africa, Australia, New Guinea, Fiji and New Caledonia, but are progressively less common towards the north. They have a high species richness in New Caledonia.

== Gallery ==
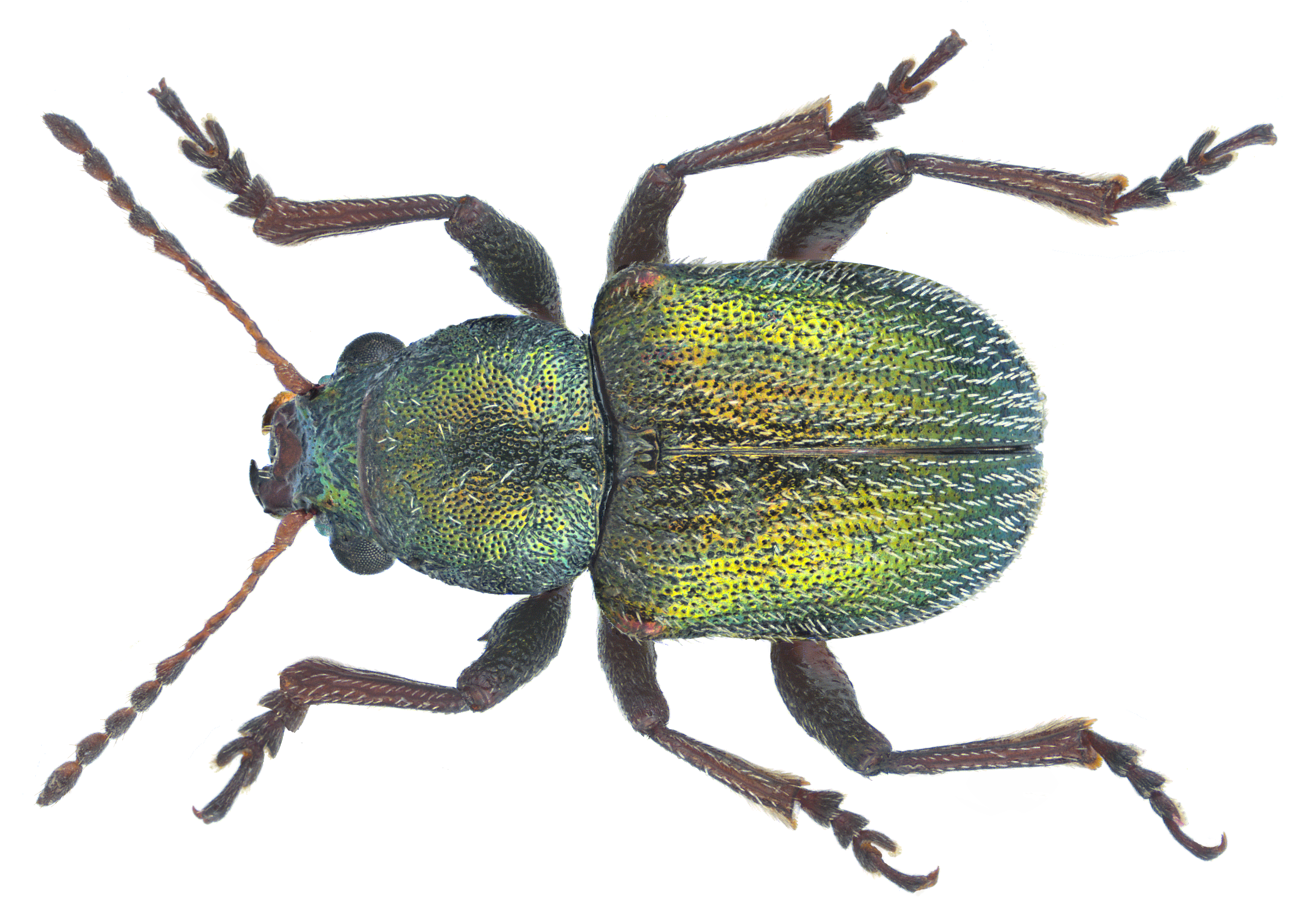
Macrocoma rubripes, a setaceous species

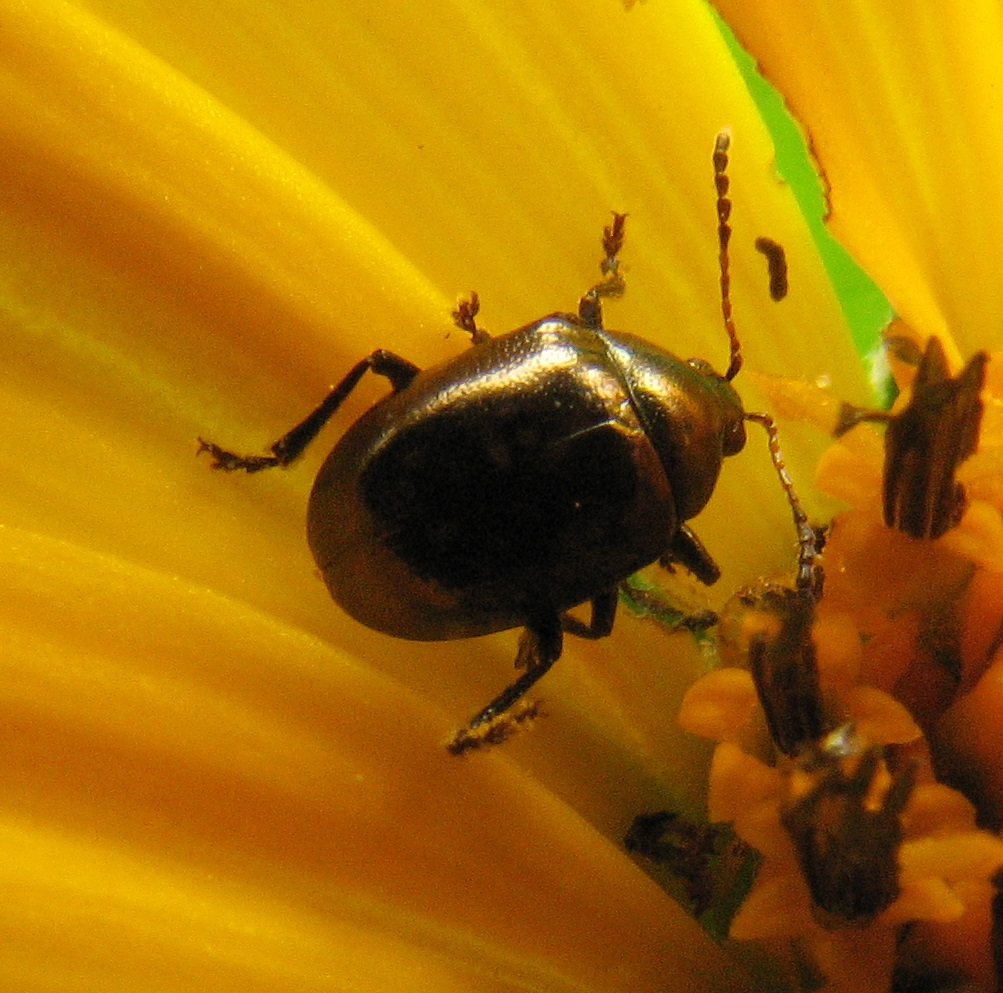
Brachypnoea sp.

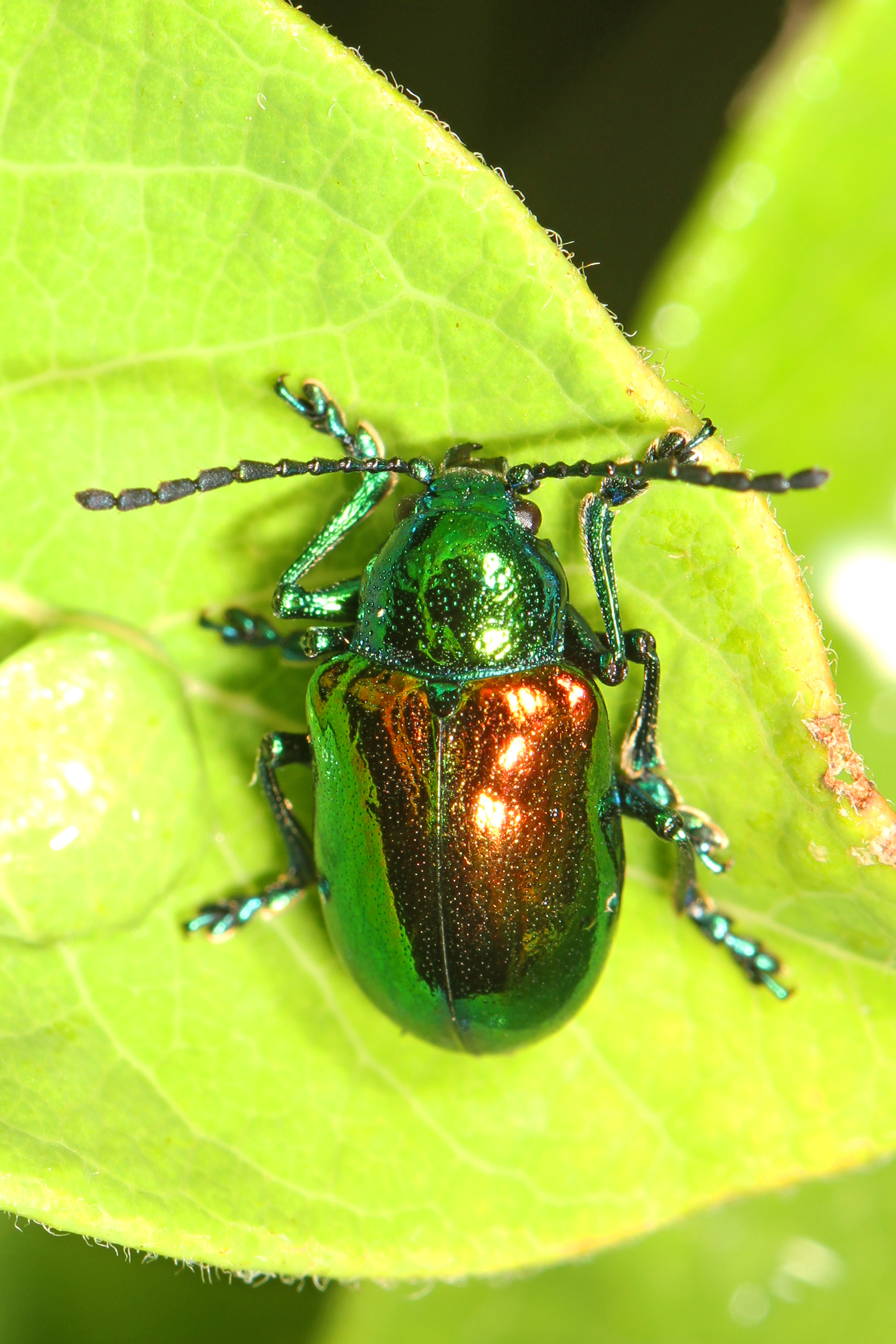
Dogbane Beetle - Chrysochus auratus

== Tribes ==
The subfamily contains the following tribes:

- Bromiini Baly, 1865 (1863) – also known as "Adoxini" in some classifications.
- Caryonodini Bechyné, 1951 – contains only Caryonoda.
- Cubispini Monrós, 1954 – contains only Cubispa and Lobispa; some authors exclude this tribe from Eumolpinae and retain it within Cassidinae instead.
- Eumolpini Hope, 1840
- Euryopini Chapuis, 1874
- Floricolini Moseyko, 2024 – contains only Floricola and Rhodopaea.
- Habrophorini Bechyné & Špringlová de Bechyné, 1969 – contains only Habrophora and Psathyrocerus.
- Hemydacnini Bechyné, 1951 – contains only Hemydacne and Colasita.
- Megascelidini Chapuis, 1874 – contains only Megascelis and Mariamela; formerly considered a separate subfamily.
- Merodini Chapuis, 1874 – contains only Meroda.
- Pygomolpini Bechyné, 1949 – contains only Pygomolpus.
- Rosiroiini Bechyné, 1950 – contains only Rosiroia.
- Typophorini Baly, 1865

The subfamily Spilopyrinae was formerly considered a tribe of Eumolpinae, while recently the subfamily Synetinae has sometimes been grouped within Eumolpinae.

== See also ==
- List of Eumolpinae genera
