= Hamlet Clark =

English clergyman and entomologist

The Reverend Hamlet Clark FLS
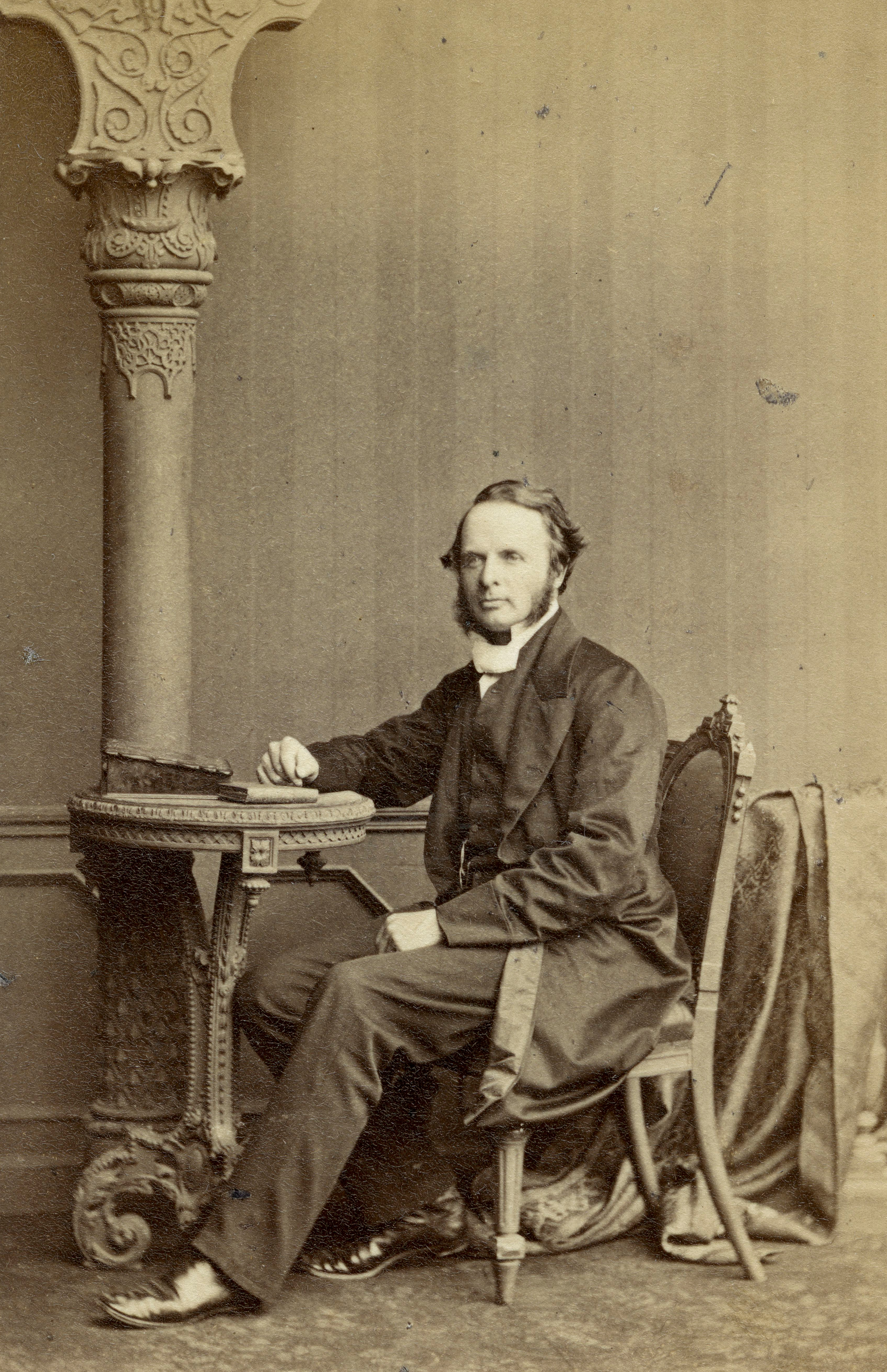
- Born: 30 March 1823; Navenby, Lincolnshire, England
- Died: 10 June 1867; Rhyl, Wales
- Occupations: clergyman and entomologist

Hamlet Clark FLS (30 March 1823 – 10 June 1867) was an English clergyman and entomologist specialising in Coleoptera, especially water beetles and leaf beetles.

Hamlet Clark was born in Navenby, Lincolnshire on 30 March 1823. He was the eldest son of Rev. Henry Clark of Harmston, Lincolnshire. His first schooling was at the Beverly Grammar School after which he studied with the Rev. Scott who ignited his interest in natural history. Hamlet was a sickly child and avoided strenuous activities. He enrolled at Corpus Christi College, Cambridge and studied under the coleopterist Thomas Vernon Wollaston (Jesus College, Cambridge). Cambridge's tuition in natural history at that time was not of a high standard, but Clark devised his own reading list and purchased specimens from local residents. His interests during that period were birds, spiders, and Lepidoptera. Later on he devoted his time to Coleoptera, in particular the water and leaf beetles.

Clark published his first article 'Captures near Towcester' in The Entomologist volume 1, 1842, pp. 409–410. He followed up with notes on specimens from Cambridgeshire, Northamptonshire and at Whittlesea Mere, and in 1855 with 'Synonymic list of the British carnivorous water beetles, together with critical remarks and notices of foreign allied species' (The Zoologist, volume 13, pp. 4846–4869). 'A synonymic list of the British species of Philhydrida' appeared the following year in the same journal. He collaborated with John Frederic Dawson on a revision of the classification and taxonomy of the British Carabidae. After this date Clark worked almost exclusively on foreign beetles. A world catalogue of Phytophaga, a joint work with Henry Walter Bates, was unfinished at his death, only the first part having been published in 1866.

Clark collected extensively throughout Great Britain. In 1856 he joined John Edward Gray on a two-month cruise to Spain and Algeria. In December of the same year he accompanied Gray once again on a trip to Rio de Janeiro in Brazil.

Clark was elected as a Fellow of the Entomological Society of London in 1850, and of the Linnean Society of London in 1860.
