= Xenochalepus deyrollei =

Scientific classification
- Kingdom: Animalia
- Phylum: Arthropoda
- Clade: Pancrustacea
- Class: Insecta
- Order: Coleoptera
- Suborder: Polyphaga
- Infraorder: Cucujiformia
- Family: Chrysomelidae
- Genus: Xenochalepus
- Species: X. deyrollei

Binomial name
- Xenochalepus deyrollei (Chapuis, 1877)

Synonyms
- Odontota deyrollei Chapuis, 1877; Chalepus deyrollei

Species of beetle

Xenochalepus deyrollei is a species of beetle of the family Chrysomelidae. It is found in Guatemala and Mexico (Guerrero, Puebla, Veracruz).

== Description ==
The vertex is trisulcate, the interocular space strongly produced and the antennae are filiform. The thorax is transverse and conic, the sides converging from the base to the apex, bisinuate, subcylindrical, transversely excavated on the hinder disc, torulose on either side behind the middle, coarsely rugose-punctate, the excavated surface nearly free from punctures. The elytra are subparallel and slightly dilated towards the apex, the latter conjointly and regularly rounded, the lateral margin serrulate, the apical border rather strongly dentate, subnitidous. Each elytron has ten, at the extreme base with eleven, rows of punctures, their interstices thickened, elevate-reticulate, the second interspace strongly, the eighth moderately, and the fourth and sixth, together with the suture, obsoletely costate.

== Biology ==
The food plant is unknown.
