= Casmena murrayi =

Scientific classification
- Kingdom: Animalia
- Phylum: Arthropoda
- Clade: Pancrustacea
- Class: Insecta
- Order: Coleoptera
- Suborder: Polyphaga
- Infraorder: Cucujiformia
- Family: Chrysomelidae
- Genus: Casmena
- Species: C. murrayi

Binomial name
- Casmena murrayi Chapuis, 1874

Species of beetle

Casmena murrayi is a species of leaf beetle of West Africa and the Democratic Republic of the Congo. It was first described from Old Calabar, now in Nigeria, by Félicien Chapuis in 1874.
