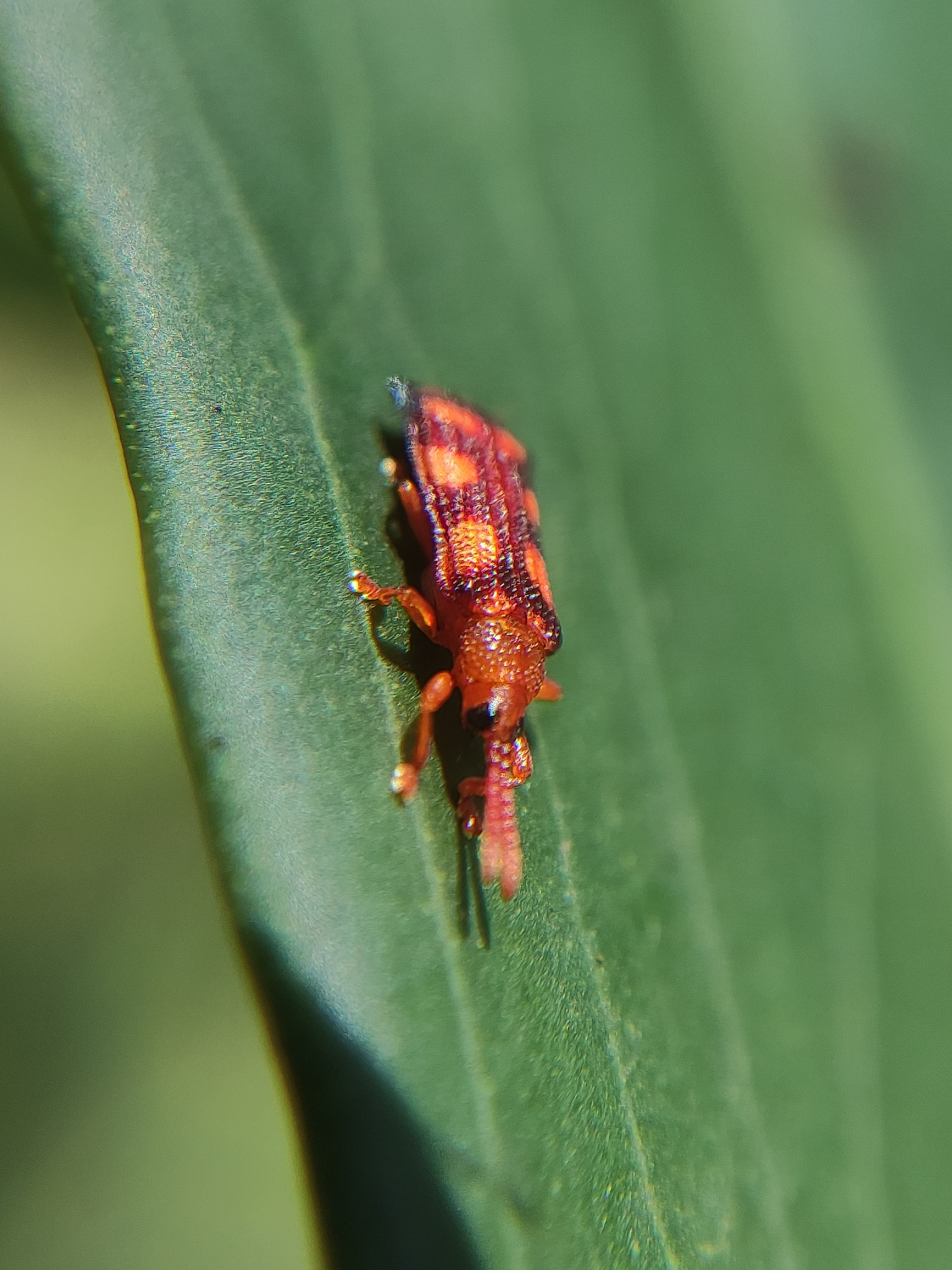
- Adult Octuroplata octopustulata photographed in Ibiúna, Brazil

Scientific classification
- Kingdom: Animalia
- Phylum: Arthropoda
- Clade: Pancrustacea
- Class: Insecta
- Order: Coleoptera
- Suborder: Polyphaga
- Infraorder: Cucujiformia
- Family: Chrysomelidae
- Subfamily: Cassidinae
- Tribe: Chalepini
- Genus: Octuroplata; Uhmann, 1940

Type species
- Uroplata octopustulata Baly, 1864

= Octuroplata =

Genus of leaf beetles

Octuroplata is a genus of beetles in the family Chrysomelidae. It was described in 1940 by Erich Uhmann, with Uroplata octopustulata as the type species, and is placed within the tribe Chalepini. Nine species are known, ranging from French Guiana to Argentina.

== Species ==
This genus includes the following species:

- Octuroplata bella Uhmann, 1940
- Octuroplata bohemani Uhmann, 1940
- Octuroplata bonvouloiri (Chapuis, 1877)
- Octuroplata octopustulata (Baly, 1864)
- Octuroplata octosignata (Weise, 1911)
- Octuroplata sinuosa (Chapuis, 1877)
- Octuroplata terminalis (Baly, 1865)
- Octuroplata uhmanni (Pic, 1933)
- Octuroplata walkeri (Baly, 1865)
