= Dactylispa setifera =

Scientific classification
- Kingdom: Animalia
- Phylum: Arthropoda
- Clade: Pancrustacea
- Class: Insecta
- Order: Coleoptera
- Suborder: Polyphaga
- Infraorder: Cucujiformia
- Family: Chrysomelidae
- Genus: Dactylispa
- Species: D. setifera

Binomial name
- Dactylispa setifera (Chapuis, 1877)

Synonyms
- Hispa setifera Chapuis, 1877; Dactylispa setifera atra Chen & T’an, 1961

Species of beetle

Dactylispa setifera is a species of beetle of the family Chrysomelidae. It is found in China (Guizhou, Yunnan), Indonesia (Sulawesi) and Thailand.

== Life history ==
The recorded host plants for this species are Oryza sativa, Zea mays and Triticum aestivum.
