= Xenochalepus apicipennis =

Scientific classification
- Kingdom: Animalia
- Phylum: Arthropoda
- Clade: Pancrustacea
- Class: Insecta
- Order: Coleoptera
- Suborder: Polyphaga
- Infraorder: Cucujiformia
- Family: Chrysomelidae
- Genus: Xenochalepus
- Species: X. apicipennis

Binomial name
- Xenochalepus apicipennis (Chapuis, 1877)

Synonyms
- Odontota apicipennis Chapuis, 1877; Chalepus (Xenochalepus) apicipennis annulicornis Weise, 1910; Xenochalepus apicipennis lunulatus Uhmann, 1938

Species of beetle

Xenochalepus apicipennis is a species of beetle of the family Chrysomelidae. It is found in Brazil, Colombia, Ecuador and Peru.

== Biology ==
The food plant is unknown.
