= Mecistes =

Scientific classification
- Kingdom: Animalia
- Phylum: Arthropoda
- Clade: Pancrustacea
- Class: Insecta
- Order: Coleoptera
- Suborder: Polyphaga
- Infraorder: Cucujiformia
- Family: Chrysomelidae
- Subfamily: Eumolpinae
- Tribe: Bromiini
- Genus: Mecistes; Chapuis, 1874

Type species
- Mecistes tarsalis Chapuis, 1874

Genus of leaf beetles from Africa

Mecistes is a genus of leaf beetles in the subfamily Eumolpinae. It is distributed in central and eastern Africa, from the Uele region and Kenya to Namibia, Botswana and the Eastern provinces of the Republic of South Africa, and in Saudi Arabia. It closely resembles the Oriental genus Apolepis.

== Species ==
Species include:

- Mecistes audisioi Zoia, 2009 – South Africa: Transvaal
- Mecistes chapuisi Jacoby, 1900 – DR Congo, Kenya, Tanzania, Zimbabwe
- Mecistes flavipes (Gerstaecker, 1855) – Mozambique, Zimbabwe, Botswana
- Mecistes grobbelaarae Zoia, 2009 – South Africa: Transvaal
- Mecistes lineatus (Pic, 1921) – central and northern Tanzania
- Mecistes seriatus Lefèvre, 1885 – Saudi Arabia, Mozambique, Eswatini, South Africa
- Mecistes tarsalis Chapuis, 1874 – DR Congo, Namibia (?), Botswana, South Africa
- Mecistes thompsoni Zoia, 2009 – Malawi, Zimbabwe, Botswana, South Africa
- Mecistes ziliolii Zoia, 2009 – Namibia, Botswana, South Africa
- Mecistes zimbabweensis Zoia, 2009 – Zimbabwe
