= Xenochalepus medius =

Scientific classification
- Kingdom: Animalia
- Phylum: Arthropoda
- Clade: Pancrustacea
- Class: Insecta
- Order: Coleoptera
- Suborder: Polyphaga
- Infraorder: Cucujiformia
- Family: Chrysomelidae
- Genus: Xenochalepus
- Species: X. medius

Binomial name
- Xenochalepus medius (Chapuis, 1877)

Synonyms
- Odontota media Chapuis, 1877; Chalepus (Xenochalepus) medius maculiventris Pic, 1932; Chalepus (Xenochalepus) wagneri Pic, 1931

Species of beetle

Xenochalepus medius is a species of beetle of the family Chrysomelidae. It is found in Argentina, Brazil (Matto Grosso), Colombia, Paraguay and Uruguay.

== Biology ==
The recorded food plants are Robinia pseudoacacia, Wistaria chinensis, Inga affinis, Phaseolus and Bahuinia species.
