= Xenochalepus chapuisi =

Scientific classification
- Kingdom: Animalia
- Phylum: Arthropoda
- Clade: Pancrustacea
- Class: Insecta
- Order: Coleoptera
- Suborder: Polyphaga
- Infraorder: Cucujiformia
- Family: Chrysomelidae
- Genus: Xenochalepus
- Species: X. chapuisi

Binomial name
- Xenochalepus chapuisi (Baly, 1885)

Synonyms
- Chalepus chapuisi Baly, 1885

Species of beetle

Xenochalepus chapuisi is a species of beetle of the family Chrysomelidae. It is found in Costa Rica, Mexico (Oaxaca, Tamaulipas, Tabasco, Veracruz, Yucatán) and Nicaragua.

== Description ==
The vertex and front are deeply trisulcate, the medial groove broad and the interocular space is strongly produced and obtusely angulate. The antennae are filiform, robust and about equal in length to the head and thorax. The thorax is transverse and subconic, the sides strongly converging from the base to the apex, bisinuate, their posterior angle obtuse, the anterior one produced into a short obtuse tooth. The upper surface is transversely convex, rather deeply excavated behind the middle, opaque, impressed, but not very closely, with large shallow ill-defined punctures, which are rather more crowded on the sides. The elytra are sculptured as in Xenochalepus contubernalis, with this exception, that the interstices between the punctures are less thickened and less distinctly reticulating with each other. The rufo-fulvous vitta, which stretches inwards from the outer margin nearly to the suture, is continued downwards on the outer border and along the first costa to below the middle of the elytra.

== Biology ==
The recorded food plant is Nissolia fruticosa.
