= Octuroplata bonvouloiri =

Scientific classification
- Kingdom: Animalia
- Phylum: Arthropoda
- Class: Insecta
- Order: Coleoptera
- Suborder: Polyphaga
- Infraorder: Cucujiformia
- Family: Chrysomelidae
- Tribe: Chalepini
- Genus: Octuroplata
- Species: O. bonvouloiri

Binomial name
- Octuroplata bonvouloiri (Chapuis, 1877)

Synonyms
- Uroplata (Uroplata) bonvouloiri Chapuis, 1877

Species of beetle

Octuroplata bonvouloiri is a species of beetle in the family Chrysomelidae. It is known from French Guiana and was initially described by Félicien Chapuis in 1877 as Uroplata bonvouloiri within Uroplata subgenus Uroplata. It would be transferred to the genus Octuroplata in 1937 by Erich Uhmann and combined as Octuroplata bonvouloiri.
