= Xenochalepus bilineatus =

Scientific classification
- Kingdom: Animalia
- Phylum: Arthropoda
- Clade: Pancrustacea
- Class: Insecta
- Order: Coleoptera
- Suborder: Polyphaga
- Infraorder: Cucujiformia
- Family: Chrysomelidae
- Genus: Xenochalepus
- Species: X. bilineatus

Binomial name
- Xenochalepus bilineatus (Chapuis, 1877)

Synonyms
- Odontota bilineata Chapuis, 1877; Xenochalepus bilineatus kuntzeni Uhmann 1938; Xenochalepus signicollis Uhmann, 1927

Species of beetle

Xenochalepus bilineatus is a species of beetle of the family Chrysomelidae. It is found in Colombia and French Guiana.

== Biology ==
The food plant is unknown.
