= Dactylispa insignita =

Scientific classification
- Kingdom: Animalia
- Phylum: Arthropoda
- Class: Insecta
- Order: Coleoptera
- Suborder: Polyphaga
- Infraorder: Cucujiformia
- Family: Chrysomelidae
- Genus: Dactylispa
- Species: D. insignita

Binomial name
- Dactylispa insignita (Chapuis, 1877)

Synonyms
- Hispa insignita Chapuis, 1877

Species of beetle

Dactylispa insignita is a species of beetle of the family Chrysomelidae. It is found in Sri Lanka.

== Life history ==
No host plant has been documented for this species.
