= Scelida =

Scientific classification
- Kingdom: Animalia
- Phylum: Arthropoda
- Clade: Pancrustacea
- Class: Insecta
- Order: Coleoptera
- Suborder: Polyphaga
- Infraorder: Cucujiformia
- Family: Chrysomelidae
- Subfamily: Galerucinae
- Tribe: Luperini
- Subtribe: Luperina
- Genus: Scelida; Chapuis, 1875

Genus of beetles

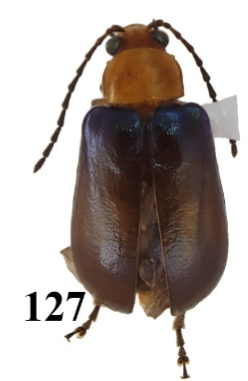
Scelida nigricornis

Scelida is a genus of skeletonizing leaf beetles in the family Chrysomelidae. There are at least four described species in Scelida. They are found in North America and the Neotropics.

== Species ==
These four species belong to the genus Scelida:

- Scelida flaviceps (Horn, 1893)
- Scelida metallica Jacoby, 1888
- Scelida mimula
- Scelida nigricornis (Jacoby, 1888)
