= Dactylispa ramuligera =

Scientific classification
- Kingdom: Animalia
- Phylum: Arthropoda
- Clade: Pancrustacea
- Class: Insecta
- Order: Coleoptera
- Suborder: Polyphaga
- Infraorder: Cucujiformia
- Family: Chrysomelidae
- Genus: Dactylispa
- Species: D. ramuligera

Binomial name
- Dactylispa ramuligera (Chapuis, 1877)

Synonyms
- Hispa ramuligera Chapuis, 1877; Hispa bellula Gestro, 1897

Species of beetle

Dactylispa ramuligera is a species of beetle of the family Chrysomelidae. It is found in China (Yunnan), Indonesia (Borneo, Java, Malacca, Sumatra), Laos and Malaysia.

== Life history ==
No host plant has been documented for this species.
