= Xenochalepus guerini =

Scientific classification
- Kingdom: Animalia
- Phylum: Arthropoda
- Clade: Pancrustacea
- Class: Insecta
- Order: Coleoptera
- Suborder: Polyphaga
- Infraorder: Cucujiformia
- Family: Chrysomelidae
- Genus: Xenochalepus
- Species: X. guerini

Binomial name
- Xenochalepus guerini (Chapuis, 1877)

Synonyms
- Odontota guerini Chapuis, 1877; Chalepus (Xenochalepus) congruus Pic, 1931; Chalepus (Xenochalepus) bajulus latereductus Pic, 1931; Chalepus (Xenochalepus) bajulus jatahyensis Pic, 1931; Chalepus (Xenochalepus) bajulus lateobliteratus Pic, 1931

Species of beetle

Xenochalepus guerini is a species of beetle of the family Chrysomelidae. It is found in Argentina, Bolivia, Brazil (Goiás, São Paulo), Paraguay and Peru.

== Biology ==
The recorded food plants are Oryza and Olyra species.
