= Mecistes tarsalis =

Scientific classification
- Kingdom: Animalia
- Phylum: Arthropoda
- Clade: Pancrustacea
- Class: Insecta
- Order: Coleoptera
- Suborder: Polyphaga
- Infraorder: Cucujiformia
- Family: Chrysomelidae
- Genus: Mecistes
- Species: M. tarsalis

Binomial name
- Mecistes tarsalis Chapuis, 1874

Synonyms
- Mecistes indigaceus Jacoby, 1898

Species of beetle

Mecistes tarsalis is a species of leaf beetle found in the Democratic Republic of the Congo, Namibia (with uncertainty), Botswana and South Africa. It was first described by the Belgian entomologist Félicien Chapuis in 1874.
