= Xenochalepus haroldi =

Scientific classification
- Kingdom: Animalia
- Phylum: Arthropoda
- Clade: Pancrustacea
- Class: Insecta
- Order: Coleoptera
- Suborder: Polyphaga
- Infraorder: Cucujiformia
- Family: Chrysomelidae
- Genus: Xenochalepus
- Species: X. haroldi

Binomial name
- Xenochalepus haroldi (Chapuis, 1877)

Synonyms
- Odontota haroldi Chapuis, 1877; Xenochalepus ovatus Uhmann, 1938

Species of beetle

Xenochalepus haroldi is a species of beetle of the family Chrysomelidae. It is found in Argentina and Bolivia.

== Biology ==
The recorded food plant is Phaseolus vulgaris.
