= Octuroplata sinuosa =

Scientific classification
- Kingdom: Animalia
- Phylum: Arthropoda
- Class: Insecta
- Order: Coleoptera
- Suborder: Polyphaga
- Infraorder: Cucujiformia
- Family: Chrysomelidae
- Tribe: Chalepini
- Genus: Octuroplata
- Species: O. sinuosa

Binomial name
- Octuroplata sinuosa (Chapuis, 1877)

Synonyms
- Uroplata (Uroplata) sinuosa Chapuis, 1877

Species of beetle

Octuroplata sinuosa is a species of beetle in the family Chrysomelidae. It is known from French Guiana and was initially described by Félicien Chapuis in 1877 as Uroplata sinuosa within Uroplata subgenus Uroplata. It would be transferred to the genus Octuroplata in 1940 by Erich Uhmann and combined as Octuroplata sinuosa.
