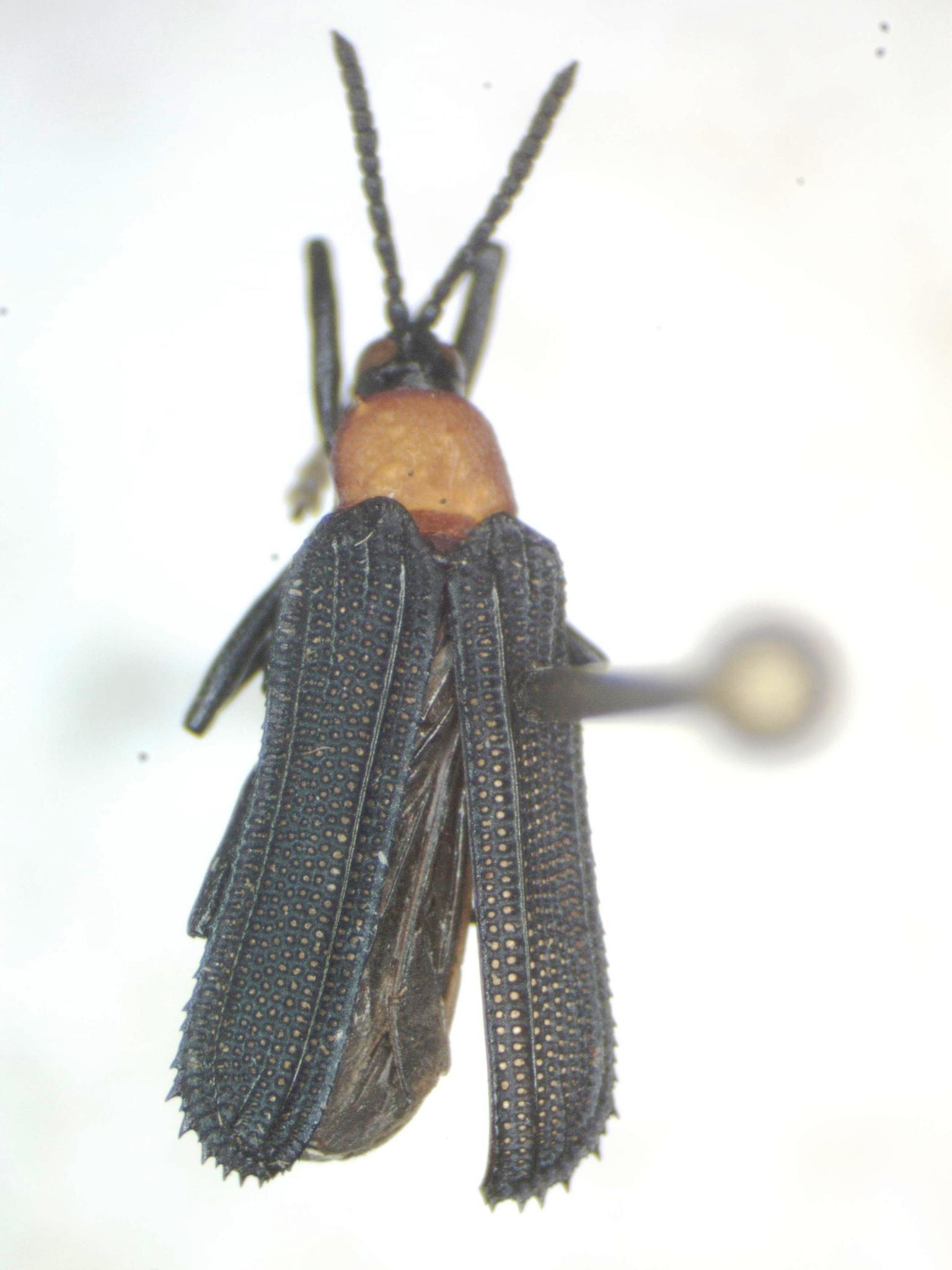

Scientific classification
- Kingdom: Animalia
- Phylum: Arthropoda
- Clade: Pancrustacea
- Class: Insecta
- Order: Coleoptera
- Suborder: Polyphaga
- Infraorder: Cucujiformia
- Family: Chrysomelidae
- Genus: Xenochalepus
- Species: X. rufithorax

Binomial name
- Xenochalepus rufithorax (Baly 1885)

Synonyms
- Chalepus rufithorax Baly 1885; Chalepus sanguinosus Baly 1885

= Xenochalepus rufithorax =

Species of beetle

Xenochalepus rufithorax is a species of beetle in the family Chrysomelidae. It is found in Costa Rica, El Salvador, Mexico (Guerrero, Veracruz) and Nicaragua.

== Description ==
It is very similar to Xenochalepus erythroderus, but the clypeus is rather larger, less distinctly pentangular, and the oblique apical foveae are much smaller and narrower, the sides of the thorax are slightly distinctly trisinuate. The elytra are entirely black, and their apical teeth are rather finer.

== Biology ==
The food plant is unknown.
