= Dactylispa tenuicornis =

Scientific classification
- Kingdom: Animalia
- Phylum: Arthropoda
- Class: Insecta
- Order: Coleoptera
- Suborder: Polyphaga
- Infraorder: Cucujiformia
- Family: Chrysomelidae
- Genus: Dactylispa
- Species: D. tenuicornis

Binomial name
- Dactylispa tenuicornis (Chapuis, 1877)

Synonyms
- Hispa tenuicornis Chapuis, 1877

Species of beetle

Dactylispa tenuicornis is a species of beetle of the family Chrysomelidae. It is found in Kenya and South Africa.

== Life history ==
The recorded host plants for this species are Acanthaceae species.
