= Xenochalepus bicostatus =

Scientific classification
- Kingdom: Animalia
- Phylum: Arthropoda
- Clade: Pancrustacea
- Class: Insecta
- Order: Coleoptera
- Suborder: Polyphaga
- Infraorder: Cucujiformia
- Family: Chrysomelidae
- Genus: Xenochalepus
- Species: X. bicostatus

Binomial name
- Xenochalepus bicostatus (Chapuis, 1877)

Synonyms
- Odontota bicostata Chapuis, 1877; Xenochalepus bicostatus fasciata Weise, 1922; Xenochalepus (Hemichalepus) bicostatus vittata Uhmann, 1961

Species of beetle

Xenochalepus bicostatus is a species of beetle of the family Chrysomelidae. It is found in Argentina, Brazil (Goiás, Matto Grosso, Rio Grande do Sul, São Paulo), Colombia, Costa Rica, French Guiana, Nicaragua, Panama, Paraguay and Venezuela.

== Biology ==
The recorded food plant is Celtis tala.
