= Xenochalepus trilineatus =

Scientific classification
- Kingdom: Animalia
- Phylum: Arthropoda
- Clade: Pancrustacea
- Class: Insecta
- Order: Coleoptera
- Suborder: Polyphaga
- Infraorder: Cucujiformia
- Family: Chrysomelidae
- Genus: Xenochalepus
- Species: X. trilineatus

Binomial name
- Xenochalepus trilineatus (Chapuis, 1877)

Synonyms
- Odontota trilineatus Chapuis, 1877; Odontota postica Chapuis, 1877; Odontota subaenea Chapuis, 1877; Odontota volxemi Chapuis, 1877; Xenochalepus trilineatus utraque Uhmann, 1958

Species of beetle

Xenochalepus trilineatus is a species of beetle of the family Chrysomelidae. It is found in Argentina and Brazil (Bahia, Goyaz, Rio Grande do Sul, São Paulo).

== Biology ==
The recorded food plant is Mucuna pluricostala.
