= Casmena =

Scientific classification
- Kingdom: Animalia
- Phylum: Arthropoda
- Clade: Pancrustacea
- Class: Insecta
- Order: Coleoptera
- Suborder: Polyphaga
- Infraorder: Cucujiformia
- Family: Chrysomelidae
- Subfamily: Eumolpinae
- Tribe: Bromiini
- Genus: Casmena; Chapuis, 1874

Type species
- Casmena murrayi Chapuis, 1874

Genus of leaf beetles from Africa

Casmena is a genus of leaf beetles in the subfamily Eumolpinae. It is distributed in Africa.

== Species ==
- Casmena bicoloripes Pic, 1941 – Cameroon
- Casmena calva Burgeon, 1941 – DR Congo
- Casmena camerunensis Pic, 1953 – Cameroon
- Casmena congoensis Selman, 1972 – Congo, DR Congo, Ivory Coast
- Casmena elongata Pic, 1953 – Guinea
- Casmena ghesquierei Burgeon, 1941 – DR Congo
- Casmena gracilis Burgeon, 1941 – DR Congo
- Casmena humeralis Pic, 1923 – Ethiopia
- Casmena incerta Pic, 1951 – Senegal
- Casmena minuta Pic, 1952 – DR Congo
- Casmena murrayi Chapuis, 1874 – West Africa, DR Congo
- Casmena nigricolor Pic, 1951 – DR Congo
- Casmena schoutedeni Pic, 1952 – DR Congo
- Casmena sericea Burgeon, 1941 – DR Congo
- Casmena subacuminata Pic, 1941 – Congo, DR Congo
- Casmena unicolor Pic, 1923 – Tanzania
