= Trachymela litigiosa =

Scientific classification
- Domain: Eukaryota
- Kingdom: Animalia
- Phylum: Arthropoda
- Class: Insecta
- Order: Coleoptera
- Suborder: Polyphaga
- Infraorder: Cucujiformia
- Family: Chrysomelidae
- Subfamily: Chrysomelinae
- Tribe: Chrysomelini
- Genus: Trachymela
- Species: T. litigiosa

Binomial name
- Trachymela litigiosa (Chapuis, 1877)

Synonyms
- Paropsis litigiosa Chapuis, 1877

Species of beetle

Trachymela litigiosa is a species of leaf beetle in the family Chrysomelidae, which was first described in 1877 as Paropsis litigiosa by Félicien Chapuis, from a specimen collected at Port Denison (Sydney).
