= Xenochalepus platymeroides =

Scientific classification
- Kingdom: Animalia
- Phylum: Arthropoda
- Clade: Pancrustacea
- Class: Insecta
- Order: Coleoptera
- Suborder: Polyphaga
- Infraorder: Cucujiformia
- Family: Chrysomelidae
- Genus: Xenochalepus
- Species: X. platymeroides

Binomial name
- Xenochalepus platymeroides Uhmann, 1938

Synonyms
- Xenochalepus platymeroides humeroptica Uhmann, 1938

Species of beetle

Xenochalepus platymeroides is a species of beetle of the family Chrysomelidae. It is found in Brazil (Bahia, Minas Gerais, Rio de Janeiro, São Paulo).

== Biology ==
The recorded food plants are Mucuna pluricostala and Canavalia ensiformis.
