= Xenochalepus waterhousei =

Scientific classification
- Kingdom: Animalia
- Phylum: Arthropoda
- Clade: Pancrustacea
- Class: Insecta
- Order: Coleoptera
- Suborder: Polyphaga
- Infraorder: Cucujiformia
- Family: Chrysomelidae
- Genus: Xenochalepus
- Species: X. waterhousei

Binomial name
- Xenochalepus waterhousei (Baly, 1885)

Synonyms
- Chalepus waterhousei Baly, 1885; Chalepus waterhousii

Species of beetle

Xenochalepus waterhousei is a species of beetle of the family Chrysomelidae. It is found in Mexico (Baja California, Tabasco, Veracruz).

== Description ==
The vertex is shining and impunctate, the front rather strongly produced, 5-sulcate, the intermediate pair of sulci ill-defined. The antennae are half the length of the body and filiform. The thorax is transverse, about one third broader than long at the base, the sides slightly rounded and converging from the base to the apex, the anterior angle with a short lateral tubercle. The basal margin is deeply excavated on either side of the medial lobe, transversely convex, rather deeply excavated transversely on the hinder disc immediately in front of the basal lobe. The surface is covered with large fovea, shallow on the sides, more deeply impressed on the disc. The elytra are subelongate, strongly lobed at the base, parallel and very feebly dilated towards the apex, the latter entire, and regularly rounded. The lateral margin is finely, its hinder third, together with the apical border, rather coarsely, serrulate, above convex on the sides, flattened along the suture. Each elytron has ten, at the extreme base with eleven, regular rows of large deep punctures, the second interspace strongly, the eighth, together with the extreme apex of the fourth and the basal fourth of the sixth, moderately costate. Each elytron also has an irregular fulvous patch, covering the humeral callus, and extending downwards from the base nearly to the middle of the disc.

== Biology ==
The food plant is unknown.
