= Casmena ghesquierei =

Scientific classification
- Kingdom: Animalia
- Phylum: Arthropoda
- Clade: Pancrustacea
- Class: Insecta
- Order: Coleoptera
- Suborder: Polyphaga
- Infraorder: Cucujiformia
- Family: Chrysomelidae
- Genus: Casmena
- Species: C. ghesquierei

Binomial name
- Casmena ghesquierei Burgeon, 1941

Species of beetle

Casmena ghesquierei is a species of leaf beetle of the Democratic Republic of the Congo. It was first described by the Belgian entomologist Louis Burgeon in 1941.
