= Casmena schoutedeni =

Scientific classification
- Kingdom: Animalia
- Phylum: Arthropoda
- Clade: Pancrustacea
- Class: Insecta
- Order: Coleoptera
- Suborder: Polyphaga
- Infraorder: Cucujiformia
- Family: Chrysomelidae
- Genus: Casmena
- Species: C. schoutedeni

Binomial name
- Casmena schoutedeni Pic, 1952

Species of beetle

Casmena schoutedeni is a species of leaf beetle of the Democratic Republic of the Congo, described by Maurice Pic in 1952.
