= Xenochalepus chromaticus =

Scientific classification
- Kingdom: Animalia
- Phylum: Arthropoda
- Clade: Pancrustacea
- Class: Insecta
- Order: Coleoptera
- Suborder: Polyphaga
- Infraorder: Cucujiformia
- Family: Chrysomelidae
- Genus: Xenochalepus
- Species: X. chromaticus

Binomial name
- Xenochalepus chromaticus (Baly, 1885)

Synonyms
- Chalepus chromaticus Baly, 1885

Species of beetle

Xenochalepus chromaticus is a species of beetle of the family Chrysomelidae. It is found in Costa Rica, Guatemala and Nicaragua.

== Description ==
The vertex is longitudinally grooved and the interocular space is strongly produced, its apex angulate. The antennae are robust, nearly half the length of the body and filiform. The thorax is transverse, the sides nearly parallel at the extreme base, then converging towards the apex, sinuate just behind the latter, anterior angle slightly produced laterally, acute, above transversely convex, transversely depressed on the hinder disc, opaque, impressed with large, shallow, ill-defined punctures. The elytra are parallel, regularly rounded at the apex. The lateral margin is minutely serrulate, the apex armed with a number of acute teeth, equal in length and placed at nearly equal distances on the margin. Each elytron has ten regular rows of punctures, the second, fourth, and eighth, together with the base and apex of the sixth, interspaces, costate.

== Biology ==
The food plant is unknown.
