= Xenochalepus fiebrigi =

Scientific classification
- Kingdom: Animalia
- Phylum: Arthropoda
- Clade: Pancrustacea
- Class: Insecta
- Order: Coleoptera
- Suborder: Polyphaga
- Infraorder: Cucujiformia
- Family: Chrysomelidae
- Genus: Xenochalepus
- Species: X. fiebrigi

Binomial name
- Xenochalepus fiebrigi Spaeth, 1937

Species of beetle

Xenochalepus fiebrigi is a species of beetle of the family Chrysomelidae. It is found in Argentina, Brazil (Matto Grosso) and Paraguay.

== Biology ==
The food plant is unknown.
