= Octuroplata bohemani =

Scientific classification
- Kingdom: Animalia
- Phylum: Arthropoda
- Clade: Pancrustacea
- Class: Insecta
- Order: Coleoptera
- Suborder: Polyphaga
- Infraorder: Cucujiformia
- Family: Chrysomelidae
- Tribe: Chalepini
- Genus: Octuroplata
- Species: O. bohemani

Binomial name
- Octuroplata bohemani Uhmann, 1940

Species of beetle

Octuroplata bohemani is a species of beetle in the family Chrysomelidae. It known from the Brazilian state of Amazonas. It was described by Erich Uhmann in 1940 based on two specimens collected by Joseph Sugar Baly.
