= Xenochalepus amplipennis =

Scientific classification
- Kingdom: Animalia
- Phylum: Arthropoda
- Clade: Pancrustacea
- Class: Insecta
- Order: Coleoptera
- Suborder: Polyphaga
- Infraorder: Cucujiformia
- Family: Chrysomelidae
- Genus: Xenochalepus
- Species: X. amplipennis

Binomial name
- Xenochalepus amplipennis (Baly, 1885)

Synonyms
- Chalepus amplipennis Baly, 1885

Species of beetle

Xenochalepus amplipennis is a species of beetle of the family Chrysomelidae. It is found in Costa Rica and Panama.

== Description ==
The interocular space is very strongly produced and opaque, its hinder half faintly grooved on either side, its anterior portion obscure fulvous, its medial line with a slightly raised longitudinal ridge. The antennae are half the length of the body, compressed and tapering from the sixth joint to the apex. The thorax is rather broader than long at the base and conic, the sides notched just in front of the posterior angle, slightly but distinctly angulate just beyond the middle, then obliquely converging to the apex, the anterior angle armed with an obtuse lateral tooth. Above opaque, the sides abruptly deflexed, coarsely foveolate-punctate, the disc depressed, its hinder half broadly excavated. The surface is opaque, irregularly and feebly foveolate-punctate, the medial line with a faintly impressed narrow longitudinal groove, the basal margin rather deeply excavated on either side. The elytra are dilated from the base to the hinder angle, then narrowly rounded to the apex, the latter deeply quadrate outer margin distinctly dilated, finely serrulate, more coarsely so posteriorly and on the apical border. Each elytron has ten, at the base with eleven, rows of large punctures, the second interspace strongly costate, the sixth at its base, together with the anterior half of the eighth, moderately elevated.

== Biology ==
The recorded food plants are Fabaceae species.
