= Xenochalepus festivus =

Scientific classification
- Kingdom: Animalia
- Phylum: Arthropoda
- Clade: Pancrustacea
- Class: Insecta
- Order: Coleoptera
- Suborder: Polyphaga
- Infraorder: Cucujiformia
- Family: Chrysomelidae
- Genus: Xenochalepus
- Species: X. festivus

Binomial name
- Xenochalepus festivus Weise, 1911

Species of beetle

Xenochalepus festivus is a species of beetle of the family Chrysomelidae. It is found in Argentina and Brazil.

== Biology ==
The food plant is unknown.
