= Xenochalepus morio =

Scientific classification
- Kingdom: Animalia
- Phylum: Arthropoda
- Clade: Pancrustacea
- Class: Insecta
- Order: Coleoptera
- Suborder: Polyphaga
- Infraorder: Cucujiformia
- Family: Chrysomelidae
- Genus: Xenochalepus
- Species: X. morio

Binomial name
- Xenochalepus morio (Fabricius, 1801)

Synonyms
- Hispa morio Fabricius, 1801; Pentispa morio; Penthispa morio fabricii Weise, 1910

Species of beetle

Xenochalepus morio is a species of beetle of the family Chrysomelidae. It is found in the United States (Arizona) and Mexico (Mexico City, Estado de México, Guanajuato, Oaxaca).

== Description ==
The head is moderately produced between the eyes and the vertex and front are trisulcate. The antennae are very slightly thickened towards the apex. The thorax is transverse and subconic, the sides nearly straight, converging from the base to the apex, the disc with a longitudinal callosity on either side, closely and coarsely punctured. The elytra are broader than the thorax, parallel, broadly subquadrate-emarginate at the suture, the sutural angle acute. The lateral margin is obsoletely, the apical one distinctly, serrulate. Each elytron has eight rows of punctures, the second interspace, together with the suture, costate. The interstices between the punctures are granulose and plane.

== Biology ==
The recorded food plants are Desmodium linheimeir and Benthamantha mollis.
