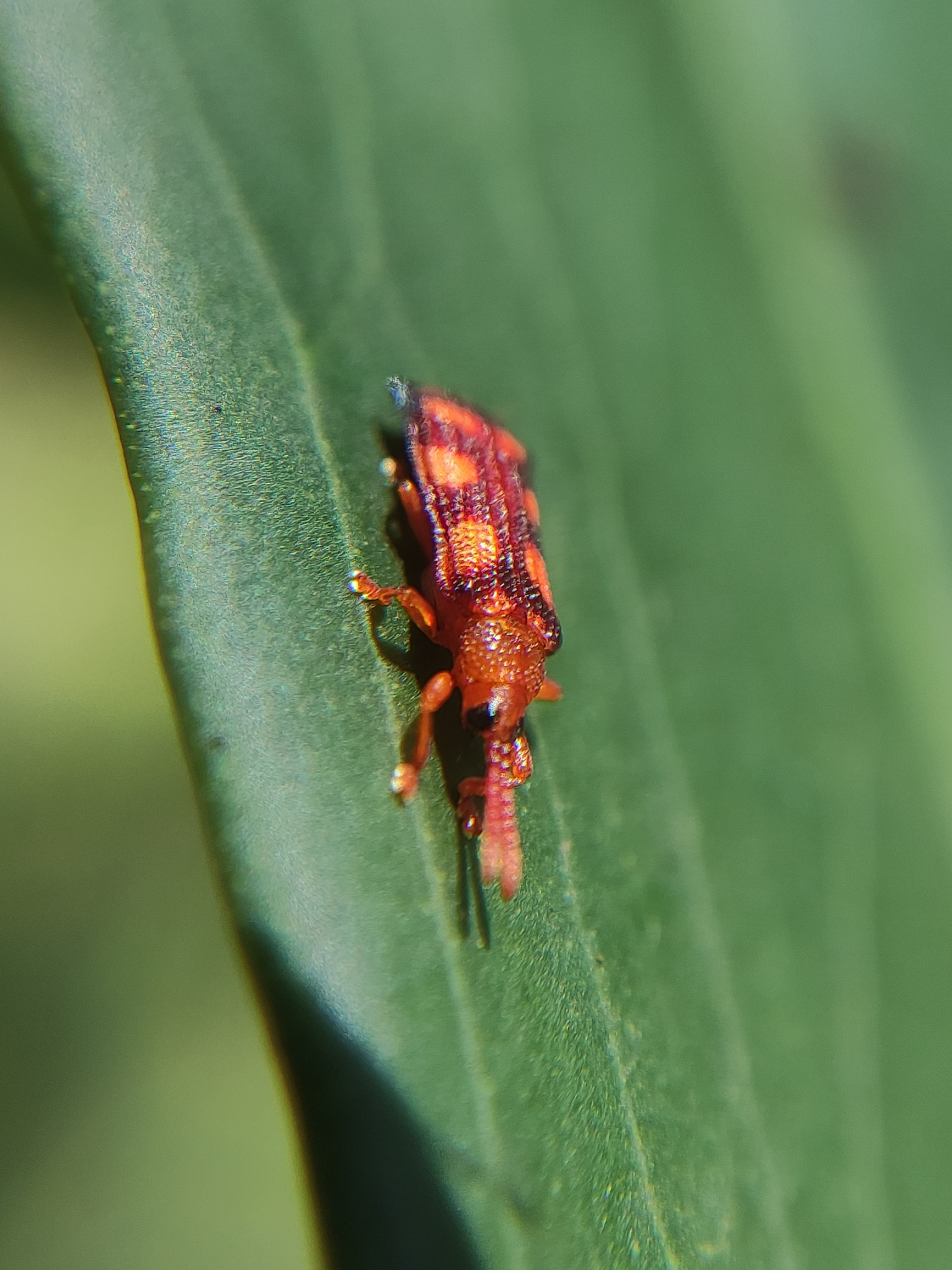
- Adult photographed in Ibiúna, Brazil

Scientific classification
- Kingdom: Animalia
- Phylum: Arthropoda
- Class: Insecta
- Order: Coleoptera
- Suborder: Polyphaga
- Infraorder: Cucujiformia
- Family: Chrysomelidae
- Tribe: Chalepini
- Genus: Octuroplata
- Species: O. octopustulata

Binomial name
- Octuroplata octopustulata (Baly, 1864)

Synonyms
- Uroplata octopustulata Baly, 1864

= Octuroplata octopustulata =

Species of beetle

Octuroplata octopustulata is a species of beetle in the family Chrysomelidae. Known from Argentina, Brazil, and Paraguay, it is a leaf miner that has been documented feeding on Senna australis, Eugenia ovalifolia, and Ouratea cuspidata. It was initially described by Joseph Sugar Baly in 1864 as Uroplata octopustulata, but would be transferred to the genus Octuroplata in 1937 by Erich Uhmann and combined as Octuroplata octopustulata.
