= Xenochalepus maculicollis =

Scientific classification
- Kingdom: Animalia
- Phylum: Arthropoda
- Clade: Pancrustacea
- Class: Insecta
- Order: Coleoptera
- Suborder: Polyphaga
- Infraorder: Cucujiformia
- Family: Chrysomelidae
- Genus: Xenochalepus
- Species: X. maculicollis

Binomial name
- Xenochalepus maculicollis (Champion, 1894)

Synonyms
- Chalepus maculicollis Champion, 1894

Species of beetle

Xenochalepus maculicollis is a species of beetle of the family Chrysomelidae. It is found in Mexico (Guerrero).

== Biology ==
The food plant is unknown.
