= Xenochalepus monrosi =

Scientific classification
- Kingdom: Animalia
- Phylum: Arthropoda
- Clade: Pancrustacea
- Class: Insecta
- Order: Coleoptera
- Suborder: Polyphaga
- Infraorder: Cucujiformia
- Family: Chrysomelidae
- Genus: Xenochalepus
- Species: X. monrosi

Binomial name
- Xenochalepus monrosi Uhmann, 1951

Synonyms
- Xenochalepus monrosi anancyra Uhmann, 1951

Species of beetle

Xenochalepus monrosi is a species of beetle of the family Chrysomelidae. It is found in Brazil (Paraná, São Paulo).

== Biology ==
The food plant is unknown.
