= Xenochalepus firmus =

Scientific classification
- Kingdom: Animalia
- Phylum: Arthropoda
- Clade: Pancrustacea
- Class: Insecta
- Order: Coleoptera
- Suborder: Polyphaga
- Infraorder: Cucujiformia
- Family: Chrysomelidae
- Genus: Xenochalepus
- Species: X. firmus

Binomial name
- Xenochalepus firmus (Weise, 1910)

Synonyms
- Chalepus (Xenochalepus) firmus Weise, 1910

Species of beetle

Xenochalepus firmus is a species of beetle of the family Chrysomelidae. It is found in Brazil (Mato Grosso).

== Biology ==
The food plant is unknown.
