= Mecistes chapuisi =

Scientific classification
- Kingdom: Animalia
- Phylum: Arthropoda
- Clade: Pancrustacea
- Class: Insecta
- Order: Coleoptera
- Suborder: Polyphaga
- Infraorder: Cucujiformia
- Family: Chrysomelidae
- Genus: Mecistes
- Species: M. chapuisi

Binomial name
- Mecistes chapuisi Jacoby, 1900

Species of beetle

Mecistes chapuisi is a species of leaf beetle found in the Democratic Republic of the Congo, Kenya, Tanzania and Zimbabwe. It was first described by the entomologist Martin Jacoby in 1900.
