= Casmena congoensis =

Scientific classification
- Kingdom: Animalia
- Phylum: Arthropoda
- Clade: Pancrustacea
- Class: Insecta
- Order: Coleoptera
- Suborder: Polyphaga
- Infraorder: Cucujiformia
- Family: Chrysomelidae
- Genus: Casmena
- Species: C. congoensis

Binomial name
- Casmena congoensis Selman, 1972

Species of beetle

Casmena congoensis is a species of leaf beetle reported from the Republic of the Congo, the Democratic Republic of the Congo and Ivory Coast. It was first described from Garamba National Park by Brian J. Selman in 1972. The species was collected on Gramineae.
