= Xenochalepus suturata =

Scientific classification
- Kingdom: Animalia
- Phylum: Arthropoda
- Clade: Pancrustacea
- Class: Insecta
- Order: Coleoptera
- Suborder: Polyphaga
- Infraorder: Cucujiformia
- Family: Chrysomelidae
- Genus: Xenochalepus
- Species: X. suturata

Binomial name
- Xenochalepus suturata (Uhmann, 1957)

Synonyms
- Chalepus (Xenochalepus) suturalis Pic, 1932 (preocc.); Xenochalepus (Xenochalepus) suturata Uhmann, 1957

Species of beetle

Xenochalepus suturata is a species of beetle of the family Chrysomelidae. It is found in Central America.

== Biology ==
The food plant is unknown.
