= Xenochalepus robiniae =

Scientific classification
- Kingdom: Animalia
- Phylum: Arthropoda
- Clade: Pancrustacea
- Class: Insecta
- Order: Coleoptera
- Suborder: Polyphaga
- Infraorder: Cucujiformia
- Family: Chrysomelidae
- Genus: Xenochalepus
- Species: X. robiniae

Binomial name
- Xenochalepus robiniae Butte, 1968

Species of beetle

Xenochalepus robiniae is a species of leaf beetle in the family Chrysomelidae. It is found in North America, where it has been recorded from Arizona.

== Biology ==
The food plant is unknown, but adults have been collected on Robinia neomexicana.
