= Mecistes seriatus =

Scientific classification
- Kingdom: Animalia
- Phylum: Arthropoda
- Clade: Pancrustacea
- Class: Insecta
- Order: Coleoptera
- Suborder: Polyphaga
- Infraorder: Cucujiformia
- Family: Chrysomelidae
- Genus: Mecistes
- Species: M. seriatus

Binomial name
- Mecistes seriatus Lefèvre, 1885

Synonyms
- Mecistes saudica Medvedev, 1997

Species of beetle

Mecistes seriatus is a species of leaf beetle found in Saudi Arabia, Mozambique, Eswatini and South Africa. It was first described by the French entomologist Édouard Lefèvre in 1885.
