= Xenochalepus bajulus =

Scientific classification
- Kingdom: Animalia
- Phylum: Arthropoda
- Clade: Pancrustacea
- Class: Insecta
- Order: Coleoptera
- Suborder: Polyphaga
- Infraorder: Cucujiformia
- Family: Chrysomelidae
- Genus: Xenochalepus
- Species: X. bajulus

Binomial name
- Xenochalepus bajulus Weise, 1911

Synonyms
- Xenochalepus bajulus chacoensis Monrós & Viana, 1947; Xenochalepus bajulus latereducta Pic, 1931

Species of beetle

Xenochalepus bajulus is a species of beetle of the family Chrysomelidae. It is found in Argentina, Bolivia, Brazil (Bahia) and Paraguay.

== Biology ==
The recorded food plants are Urea and Schubertia species.
