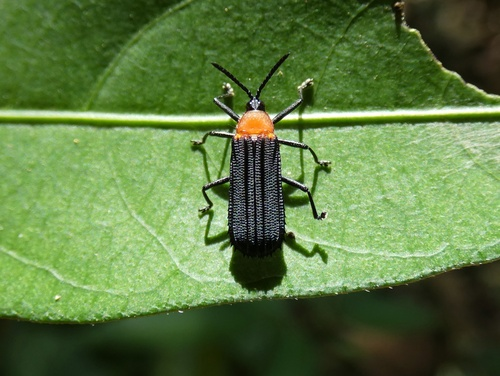
- Xenochalepus erythroderus

Scientific classification
- Kingdom: Animalia
- Phylum: Arthropoda
- Clade: Pancrustacea
- Class: Insecta
- Order: Coleoptera
- Suborder: Polyphaga
- Infraorder: Cucujiformia
- Family: Chrysomelidae
- Tribe: Chalepini
- Genus: Xenochalepus; Weise, 1910

= Xenochalepus =

Genus of beetles

Xenochalepus is a genus of tortoise beetles and hispines in the family Chrysomelidae. There are more than 90 described species in Xenochalepus.

== Species ==
These 95 species belong to the genus Xenochalepus:

- Subgenus Xenochalepus
  - Xenochalepus amplipennis (Baly, 1886)
  - Xenochalepus arcuatus Uhmann, 1940
  - Xenochalepus ater (Weise, 1905)
  - Xenochalepus bicostatus (Chapuis, 1877)
  - Xenochalepus cyanura Blake, 1971
  - Xenochalepus deyrollei (Chapuis, 1877)
  - Xenochalepus erichsoni (Weise, 1905)
  - Xenochalepus erythroderus (Chapuis, 1877)
  - Xenochalepus firmus (Weise, 1910)
  - Xenochalepus guyanensis (Spaeth, 1937)
  - Xenochalepus haroldi (Chapuis, 1877)
  - Xenochalepus holdhausi (Spaeth, 1937)
  - Xenochalepus mucunae Maulik, 1930
  - Xenochalepus nigripes (Weise, 1905)
  - Xenochalepus ocelliger Uhmann, 1940
  - Xenochalepus omogerus (Crotch, 1873)
  - Xenochalepus palmeri (Baly, 1886)
  - Xenochalepus peruvianus (Weise, 1905)
  - Xenochalepus phaseoli Uhmann, 1938
  - Xenochalepus potomacus Butte, 1968
  - Xenochalepus robiniae Butte, 1968
  - Xenochalepus rufithorax (Baly, 1885)
  - Xenochalepus thoracicus (Fabricius, 1801)
  - Xenochalepus univittatus (Baly, 1886)
  - Xenochalepus waterhousei (Baly, 1886)
  - Xenochalepus weisei Spaeth, 1937
- Subgenus Neochalepus Staines & Riley, 1994
  - Xenochalepus ampliatus (Chapuis, 1877)
  - Xenochalepus angustus (Chapuis, 1877)
  - Xenochalepus annulatus (Pic, 1931)
  - Xenochalepus annulipes (Waterhouse, 1881)
  - Xenochalepus apicipennis (Chapuis, 1877)
  - Xenochalepus assimilis Uhmann, 1947
  - Xenochalepus atriceps (Chapuis, 1877)
  - Xenochalepus bahianus Uhmann, 1942
  - Xenochalepus bajulus Weise, 1911
  - Xenochalepus bilineatus (Chapuis, 1877)
  - Xenochalepus bogotensis Weise, 1921
  - Xenochalepus boliviensis (Pic, 1931)
  - Xenochalepus brasiliensis (Pic, 1931)
  - Xenochalepus cayennensis (Pic, 1931)
  - Xenochalepus cephalotes (Chapuis, 1877)
  - Xenochalepus chapuisi (Baly, 1886)
  - Xenochalepus chromaticus (Baly, 1885)
  - Xenochalepus contubernalis (Baly, 1885)
  - Xenochalepus cruentus Uhmann, 1948
  - Xenochalepus curticornis (Pic, 1931)
  - Xenochalepus dentatus (Fabricius, 1787)
  - Xenochalepus dictyopterus (Perty, 1832)
  - Xenochalepus dilaticornis (Pic, 1931)
  - Xenochalepus discernendus Uhmann, 1940
  - Xenochalepus discointerruptus (Pic, 1932)
  - Xenochalepus diversipes (Pic, 1931)
  - Xenochalepus donckieri (Pic, 1931)
  - Xenochalepus faustus (Weise, 1905)
  - Xenochalepus festivus Weise, 1911
  - Xenochalepus fiebrigi Spaeth, 1937
  - Xenochalepus fraternalis (Baly, 1886)
  - Xenochalepus frictus (Weise, 1905)
  - Xenochalepus goyasensis (Pic, 1931)
  - Xenochalepus gregalis (Pic, 1921)
  - Xenochalepus guerini (Chapuis, 1877)
  - Xenochalepus hespenheidei Staines, 2000
  - Xenochalepus humerosus Uhmann, 1955
  - Xenochalepus incisus Weise, 1911
  - Xenochalepus jacobi Uhmann, 1937
  - Xenochalepus kolbei Weise, 1911
  - Xenochalepus longiceps (Pic, 1931)
  - Xenochalepus maculicollis (Champion, 1894)
  - Xenochalepus mediolineatus (Baly, 1886)
  - Xenochalepus medius (Chapuis, 1877)
  - Xenochalepus metallescens (Weise, 1905)
  - Xenochalepus minarum Spaeth, 1937
  - Xenochalepus monrosi Uhmann, 1951
  - Xenochalepus morio (Fabricius, 1801)
  - Xenochalepus nigriceps (Blanchard, 1843)
  - Xenochalepus notaticollis (Chapuis, 1877)
  - Xenochalepus octocostatus Weise, 1911
  - Xenochalepus ornatus Weise, 1911
  - Xenochalepus pictus Weise, 1911
  - Xenochalepus platymeroides Uhmann, 1938
  - Xenochalepus platymerus (Lucas, 1859)
  - Xenochalepus pugillus (Spaeth, 1937)
  - Xenochalepus rectefasciatus Pic, 1932
  - Xenochalepus robustus (Pic, 1931)
  - Xenochalepus rubripennis (Spaeth, 1937)
  - Xenochalepus rubronotatus (Pic, 1931)
  - Xenochalepus serratus (Fabricius, 1787)
  - Xenochalepus suturata (Uhmann, 1957)
  - Xenochalepus tandilensis (Bruch, 1933)
  - Xenochalepus transversalis (Chapuis, 1877)
  - Xenochalepus trilineatus (Chapuis, 1877)
  - Xenochalepus velutinus (Chapuis, 1877)
  - Xenochalepus venezuelensis (Pic, 1931)
  - Xenochalepus viridiceps (Pic, 1934)
  - Xenochalepus vittatipennis (Spaeth, 1937)

== Selected former species ==
- Xenochalepus signaticollis (Baly, 1886) (moved to Odontota)
