= Xenochalepus nigriceps =

Scientific classification
- Kingdom: Animalia
- Phylum: Arthropoda
- Clade: Pancrustacea
- Class: Insecta
- Order: Coleoptera
- Suborder: Polyphaga
- Infraorder: Cucujiformia
- Family: Chrysomelidae
- Genus: Xenochalepus
- Species: X. nigriceps

Binomial name
- Xenochalepus nigriceps (Blanchard, 1843)

Synonyms
- Odontota nigriceps Blanchard, 1843; Chalepus aeneiceps Pic, 1937

Species of beetle

Xenochalepus nigriceps is a species of beetle of the family Chrysomelidae. It is found in Bolivia and Brazil (Minas Gerais) and Paraguay.
