= Xenochalepus palmeri =

Scientific classification
- Kingdom: Animalia
- Phylum: Arthropoda
- Clade: Pancrustacea
- Class: Insecta
- Order: Coleoptera
- Suborder: Polyphaga
- Infraorder: Cucujiformia
- Family: Chrysomelidae
- Genus: Xenochalepus
- Species: X. palmeri

Binomial name
- Xenochalepus palmeri (Baly, 1885)

Synonyms
- Chalepus palmeri Baly, 1885

Species of beetle

Xenochalepus palmeri is a species of beetle of the family Chrysomelidae. It is found in Mexico (Coahuila).

== Description ==
The interocular space is moderately produced, 5-sulcate, the middle sulcus short, terminated anteriorly by a longitudinal ridge. The antennae are less than half the length of the body, filiform and slightly thickened beyond the middle. The thorax is transverse, the sides straight and nearly parallel from the base to beyond the middle, then obliquely converging and slightly sinuate to the apex, the anterior angle armed with a short oblique tubercle, above transversely convex, flattened and broadly excavated on the hinder disc. On either side is a longitudinal ill-defined irregular torulose space, which extends from the basal nearly to the apical margin and on the medial line is also a very fine longitudinal groove. The elytra are narrowly oblong, subparallel, rounded at the apex, deeply subquadrate-emarginate at the sutural angle. The margin is serrulate, the apical serratures rather coarser than those on the side. The upper surface is granulose. Each elytron has ten, at the base with eleven, rows of deeply punctured striae, the second interspace strongly, the eighth moderately, costate, the latter finely serrulate on the hinder disc, the fourth and sixth faintly costate at the base and apex, the suture also distinctly elevated. Each elytron has a wedge-shaped rufo-fulvous basal patch, which stretches along the base from the suture nearly to the lateral margin, and extends downwards (covering the humeral callus) for about one fourth the length of the elytron.

== Biology ==
The food plant is unknown.
