= Xenochalepus hespenheidei =

Scientific classification
- Kingdom: Animalia
- Phylum: Arthropoda
- Clade: Pancrustacea
- Class: Insecta
- Order: Coleoptera
- Suborder: Polyphaga
- Infraorder: Cucujiformia
- Family: Chrysomelidae
- Genus: Xenochalepus
- Species: X. hespenheidei

Binomial name
- Xenochalepus hespenheidei Staines, 2000

Species of beetle

Xenochalepus hespenheidei is a species of beetle of the family Chrysomelidae. It is found in Costa Rica and Panama.

== Description ==
Adults reach a length of about 7.7-9.3 mm. The antennae, eyes and scutellum are black, while the head and pronotum are yellowish-orange, the latter with a two black spots. The elytra are yellowish-orange with two black vitta and the apical one-fourth is black.

== Biology ==
The recorded food plants are Cecropia species.

== Etymology ==
The species is name for Henry A. Hespenheide, who collected the first specimens of this species.
