= Xenochalepus annulipes =

Scientific classification
- Kingdom: Animalia
- Phylum: Arthropoda
- Clade: Pancrustacea
- Class: Insecta
- Order: Coleoptera
- Suborder: Polyphaga
- Infraorder: Cucujiformia
- Family: Chrysomelidae
- Genus: Xenochalepus
- Species: X. annulipes

Binomial name
- Xenochalepus annulipes (Waterhouse, 1881)

Synonyms
- Odontota annulipes Waterhouse, 1881

Species of beetle

Xenochalepus annulipes is a species of beetle of the family Chrysomelidae. It is found in Ecuador and Peru.

== Biology ==
The food plant is unknown.
