= Octuroplata octosignata =

Scientific classification
- Kingdom: Animalia
- Phylum: Arthropoda
- Class: Insecta
- Order: Coleoptera
- Suborder: Polyphaga
- Infraorder: Cucujiformia
- Family: Chrysomelidae
- Tribe: Chalepini
- Genus: Octuroplata
- Species: O. octosignata

Binomial name
- Octuroplata octosignata (Weise, 1911)

Synonyms
- Uroplata octosignata Weise, 1911

Species of beetle

Octuroplata octosignata is a species of beetle in the family Chrysomelidae. It is known from Argentina, Brazil and Paraguay. It was initially described by Julius Weise in 1911 as Uroplata octosignata, but would be transferred to the genus Octuroplata in 1937 by Erich Uhmann and combined as Octuroplata octosignata.
