= Xenochalepus dilaticornis =

Scientific classification
- Kingdom: Animalia
- Phylum: Arthropoda
- Clade: Pancrustacea
- Class: Insecta
- Order: Coleoptera
- Suborder: Polyphaga
- Infraorder: Cucujiformia
- Family: Chrysomelidae
- Genus: Xenochalepus
- Species: X. dilaticornis

Binomial name
- Xenochalepus dilaticornis (Pic, 1931)

Synonyms
- Chalepus (Xenochalepus) dilaticornis Pic, 1931

Species of beetle

Xenochalepus dilaticornis is a species of beetle of the family Chrysomelidae. It is found in Brazil (Goiás).

== Biology ==
The food plant is unknown.
