= Xenochalepus pugillus =

Scientific classification
- Kingdom: Animalia
- Phylum: Arthropoda
- Clade: Pancrustacea
- Class: Insecta
- Order: Coleoptera
- Suborder: Polyphaga
- Infraorder: Cucujiformia
- Family: Chrysomelidae
- Genus: Xenochalepus
- Species: X. pugillus

Binomial name
- Xenochalepus pugillus (Spaeth, 1937)

Synonyms
- Chalepus (Xenochalepus) pugillus Spaeth, 1937; Xenochalepus homonymus Blackwelder, 1946; Chalepus (Hemichalepus) spaethi Papp, 1953

Species of beetle

Xenochalepus pugillus is a species of beetle of the family Chrysomelidae. It is found in Argentina.

== Biology ==
The food plant is unknown.
