= Octuroplata bella =

Scientific classification
- Kingdom: Animalia
- Phylum: Arthropoda
- Clade: Pancrustacea
- Class: Insecta
- Order: Coleoptera
- Suborder: Polyphaga
- Infraorder: Cucujiformia
- Family: Chrysomelidae
- Tribe: Chalepini
- Genus: Octuroplata
- Species: O. bella

Binomial name
- Octuroplata bella Uhmann, 1940

Species of beetle

Octuroplata bella is a species of beetle in the family Chrysomelidae. It known from the Brazilian state of Amazonas. It was described by Erich Uhmann in 1940 based on two specimens collected by Joseph Sugar Baly.
