= Xenochalepus mucunae =

Scientific classification
- Kingdom: Animalia
- Phylum: Arthropoda
- Clade: Pancrustacea
- Class: Insecta
- Order: Coleoptera
- Suborder: Polyphaga
- Infraorder: Cucujiformia
- Family: Chrysomelidae
- Genus: Xenochalepus
- Species: X. mucunae

Binomial name
- Xenochalepus mucunae Maulik, 1930

Species of beetle

Xenochalepus mucunae is a species of beetle of the family Chrysomelidae. It is found in Brazil (Bahia, Pernambuco) and French Guiana.

== Biology ==
The recorded food plant is Mucuna pluricostata.
