= Octuroplata terminalis =

Scientific classification
- Kingdom: Animalia
- Phylum: Arthropoda
- Class: Insecta
- Order: Coleoptera
- Suborder: Polyphaga
- Infraorder: Cucujiformia
- Family: Chrysomelidae
- Tribe: Chalepini
- Genus: Octuroplata
- Species: O. terminalis

Binomial name
- Octuroplata terminalis (Baly, 1865)

Synonyms
- Uroplata terminalis Baly, 1865

Species of beetle

Octuroplata terminalis is a species of beetle in the family Chrysomelidae. It is known from Brazil and was initially described by Joseph Sugar Baly in 1865 as Uroplata terminalis. It would be transferred to the genus Octuroplata in 1937 by Erich Uhmann and combined as Octuroplata terminalis.

== Description ==
The head is moderately produced between the eyes, the vertex keeled in front and furnished posteriorly with an oblong fovea, while the orbital margin is black. The antennae are nearly half the length of the body and moderately robust. The thorax is nearly twice as broad as long at the base, narrowed from the base to the apex, the sides distinctly bisinuate, and the apical angle armed with a short, curved, obtuse tooth. The scutellum is transverse at the base, while the sides are narrowed towards the apex, the latter obtusely truncate. The elytra are broader than the thorax, narrow, subparallel in front, very slightly dilated towards the hinder angle, the latter scarcely produced. The lateral border is very narrow and very remotely armed with small teeth. The apical border is moderately dilated, its edge obtusely rounded, coarsely serrate. Each elytron has three raised costa, their interspaces deeply gemellate-punctate and the interspace between the second and third costae irregularly punctured for a short space below its middle. The black apical segment of the abdomen is marked on either side with a small fulvous spot.
