= Xenochalepus platymerus =

Scientific classification
- Kingdom: Animalia
- Phylum: Arthropoda
- Clade: Pancrustacea
- Class: Insecta
- Order: Coleoptera
- Suborder: Polyphaga
- Infraorder: Cucujiformia
- Family: Chrysomelidae
- Genus: Xenochalepus
- Species: X. platymerus

Binomial name
- Xenochalepus platymerus (Lucas, 1859)

Synonyms
- Odontota platymera Lucas, 1859; Xenochalepus platymerus digesta Uhmann, 1937

Species of beetle

Xenochalepus platymerus is a species of beetle of the family Chrysomelidae. It is found in Brazil (Minas Gerais, Rio Grande do Sul, Rio de Janeiro, São Paulo) and Paraguay.

== Biology ==
The food plant is unknown.
