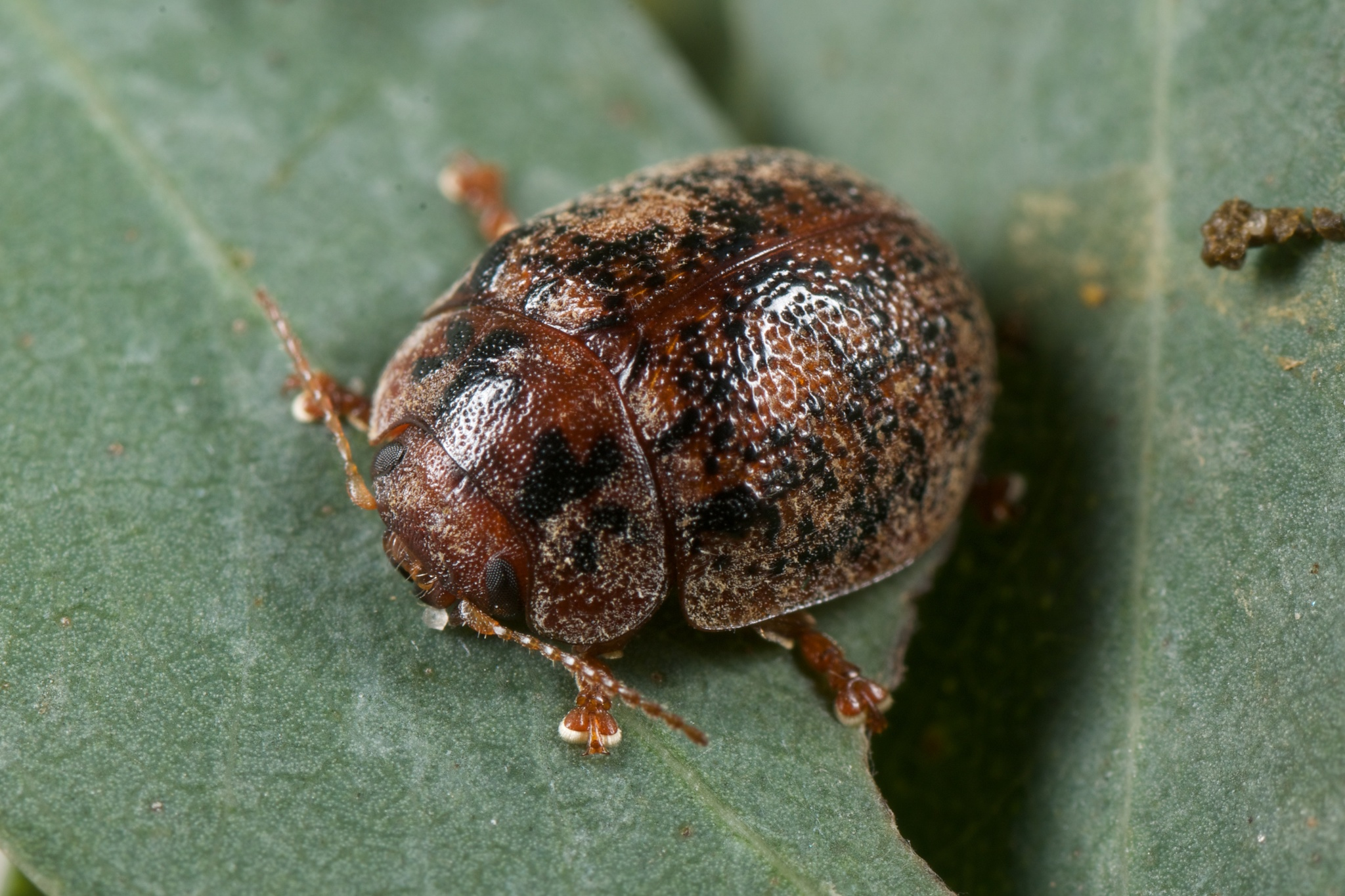
- Trachymela sloanei, California

Scientific classification
- Kingdom: Animalia
- Phylum: Arthropoda
- Clade: Pancrustacea
- Class: Insecta
- Order: Coleoptera
- Suborder: Polyphaga
- Infraorder: Cucujiformia
- Family: Chrysomelidae
- Subfamily: Chrysomelinae
- Tribe: Chrysomelini
- Genus: Trachymela
- Species: T. sloanei

Binomial name
- Trachymela sloanei (Blackburn, 1896)

= Trachymela sloanei =

Species of beetle

Trachymela sloanei, known generally as the Australian tortoise beetle or small eucalyptus tortoise beetle, is a species of leaf beetle in the family Chrysomelidae.

The species is native to Australia, where it lives on Eucalyptus trees. It feeds on species of eucalyptus such as Corymbia citriodora, C. ficifolia, C. maculata, E. camaldulensis, E. crenulata, E. globulus, E. propinqua, E.robusta, with a preference for E. camaldulensis. It is an invasive pest in California, and was recently established in Shenzhen (China), Chile, Spain, Portugal and Greece. These diverse habitats are indicative of its high dispersal capacity.

== Morphology ==
Adults are hemispherical, around 6-7 mm long, and cryptically colored brown with dark irregular spots of varying shades. Rows of fine hairs on the half of the mid and hind tibia is a distinguishing characteristic for this species.. Oval shaped eggs are commonly laid in crevices in or under loose bark, with females laying 5 to 40 eggs, they begin pinkish or light brown, and darken along an orange gradient as they age.

Larvae develop in four stages before pupation begins.They pupate underneath bark or in the soil around the base of the tree. In the presence of warm temperatures, the development quickens to roughly 5 weeks.

== Life cycle ==
Female Trachymela sloanei lay eggs in groups on eucalyptus leaves or beneath loose bark. The eggs are initially pinkish or light brown and darken as they develop. After hatching, the larvae pass through four developmental stages before pupating beneath loose bark or in the soil or lead litter around the base of the host tree. In warm conditions, development from egg to adult can take as little as five weeks. Multiple generations can occur each year, from late winter through fall.

== Feeding behavior ==
Trachymela sloanei feeds on the foliage of eucalyptus trees, including several species in the genera Eucalyptus and camaldulensis, also known as river red gum. Both adults and larvae feed primarily at night and typically shelter beneath loose bark during the day. This behavior can make infestations difficult to detect because beetles may remain hidden even when feeding damage is visible on the tree’s foliage.

== Signs of infestation ==
Infestations are typically identified by irregular notches, and semicircular holes alongside leaf edges. The damage removes the majority of the leaf's surface, with the midvein remaining. The insect also removes the leaves that the tree attempts to refoliate. In cases of dense populations of T. Sloanei, shedding or stripping of the leaves may occur. This can increase tree stress, particularly when growing conditions are unfavorable or trees are already under stress. In California, eucalyptus trees in urban parks, gardens, and agricultural areas within the beetle’s establishment may be at risk to foliage damage.

== Distribution in California ==
Trachymela sloanei was first found in Riverside County, California, in March 1998. It now occurs throughout southern California, in the Central Valley, and in the San Francisco Bay Area. The beetle has been found in areas with isolated Eucalyptus trees, such as agricultural areas, gardens, and urban parks. Because adult beetles are strong fliers, the species is expected to spread to additional locations where eucalyptus trees grow. Research in Spain has shown that artificial shelters, such as nest boxes attached to eucalyptus trees, can help detect T. sloanei in newly colonized areas.

== Management ==
Management of Trachymela sloanei focuses primarily on maintaining eucalyptus tree health and limiting the effects of infestations. Many established eucalyptus trees tolerate leaf damage, so control measures aren’t always necessary. Integrated pest management approaches emphasize appropriate cultural care and the conservation of natural enemies, while chemical treatments are generally reserved for situations where the damage is more severe.

== Biological control ==
As an invasive species, T. Sloanei are under active efforts to be controlled. In 2000, University of California scientists released more than 1,000 individuals of egg parasitoid, Enoggera reticulata, which lays its eggs inside the beetle eggs, feeding and eventually killing the egg. However, subsequent field surveys did not recover the parasitoid, suggesting that it may not have become established in California.

== Cultural control ==
The effects of this native species may be minimized by providing cultural care such as drip irrigation during periods of distress such as drought and injury. Irrigation is recommended once a month, with amounts that target deep into the soil beneath the infected tree.

== Chemical control ==
Significant research has not been conducted for practices of chemically controlling the tortoise beetle. It is uncertain if insecticides are effective as eucalyptus trees are large, and therefore difficult to treat. The species hides beneath the tree bark, making it difficult for the pesticides to contact them.If trees are under significant stress, pesticides become less efficient.
