= Xenochalepus potomacus =

Scientific classification
- Kingdom: Animalia
- Phylum: Arthropoda
- Clade: Pancrustacea
- Class: Insecta
- Order: Coleoptera
- Suborder: Polyphaga
- Infraorder: Cucujiformia
- Family: Chrysomelidae
- Genus: Xenochalepus
- Species: X. potomacus

Binomial name
- Xenochalepus potomacus Butte, 1968

Species of beetle

Xenochalepus potomacus is a species of beetle of the family Chrysomelidae. It is found in the United States (Georgia, Maryland, Missouri, South Carolina, Virginia).

== Biology ==
The recorded food plant is Phaseolus polystachios.
