= Xenochalepus nigripes =

Scientific classification
- Kingdom: Animalia
- Phylum: Arthropoda
- Clade: Pancrustacea
- Class: Insecta
- Order: Coleoptera
- Suborder: Polyphaga
- Infraorder: Cucujiformia
- Family: Chrysomelidae
- Genus: Xenochalepus
- Species: X. nigripes

Binomial name
- Xenochalepus nigripes (Weise, 1905)

Synonyms
- Chalepus nigripes Weise, 1905; Xenochalepus uhmanni Papp, 1953

Species of beetle

Xenochalepus nigripes is a species of beetle of the family Chrysomelidae. It is found in Brazil (Goiás).

== Biology ==
The food plant is unknown.
