= Xenochalepus ater =

Scientific classification
- Kingdom: Animalia
- Phylum: Arthropoda
- Clade: Pancrustacea
- Class: Insecta
- Order: Coleoptera
- Suborder: Polyphaga
- Infraorder: Cucujiformia
- Family: Chrysomelidae
- Genus: Xenochalepus
- Species: X. ater

Binomial name
- Xenochalepus ater (Weise, 1905)

Synonyms
- Chalepus omoger ater Weise 1905; Xenochalepus ater crotchi Weise 1910

Species of beetle

Xenochalepus ater is a species of leaf beetle in the family Chrysomelidae. It is found in Central America and North America, where it has been recorded from the United States (Arizona, Texas) and Mexico (Guerrero, Jalisco, Morelos).

== Biology ==
The recorded food plants are Glycine max and Phaseolus vulgaris. Furthermore, adults have been collected on Robinia species, Rhamnus betulifolia and Platanus wrightii.
