= Xenochalepus faustus =

Scientific classification
- Kingdom: Animalia
- Phylum: Arthropoda
- Clade: Pancrustacea
- Class: Insecta
- Order: Coleoptera
- Suborder: Polyphaga
- Infraorder: Cucujiformia
- Family: Chrysomelidae
- Genus: Xenochalepus
- Species: X. faustus

Binomial name
- Xenochalepus faustus (Weise, 1905)

Synonyms
- Chalepus faustus Weise, 1905; Chalepus laetificus Weise, 1906

Species of beetle

Xenochalepus faustus is a species of beetle of the family Chrysomelidae. It is found in Argentina, Bolivia, Brazil (Goiás, Matto Grosso) and Paraguay.

== Biology ==
The recorded food plant is Ipomoea heterphylla.
