= Xenochalepus fraternalis =

Scientific classification
- Kingdom: Animalia
- Phylum: Arthropoda
- Clade: Pancrustacea
- Class: Insecta
- Order: Coleoptera
- Suborder: Polyphaga
- Infraorder: Cucujiformia
- Family: Chrysomelidae
- Genus: Xenochalepus
- Species: X. fraternalis

Binomial name
- Xenochalepus fraternalis (Baly, 1885)

Synonyms
- Chalepus fraternalis Baly, 1885

Species of beetle

Xenochalepus fraternalis is a species of beetle of the family Chrysomelidae. It is found in Guatemala.

== Description ==
The antennae are rather more than one third the length of the body and very slightly thickened towards the apex. The thorax is transverse and subconic, the sides quickly converging from the base towards the apex. The upper surface is transversely excavated on the hinder disc, coarsely punctured, with a broad rufo-fulvous vitta on either side, extending nearly to the lateral border, but abbreviated just before reaching the apical margin, less deeply punctured. The elytra are narrowly oblong, subparallel, finely serrulate on the sides, regularly rounded at the apex, conjointly emarginate at the sutural angle, the apical margin serrate. Each elytron has ten, at the base with eleven, rows of punctures, the second and fourth interspaces rather strongly costate, the eighth, the sixth on its basal half, together with the suture, less distinctly elevated.

== Biology ==
The food plant is unknown.
