= Octuroplata uhmanni =

Scientific classification
- Kingdom: Animalia
- Phylum: Arthropoda
- Class: Insecta
- Order: Coleoptera
- Suborder: Polyphaga
- Infraorder: Cucujiformia
- Family: Chrysomelidae
- Tribe: Chalepini
- Genus: Octuroplata
- Species: O. uhmanni

Binomial name
- Octuroplata uhmanni (Pic, 1933)

Synonyms
- Uroplata uhmanni Pic, 1933; Uroplata uhmanni innotaticollis Pic, 1933

Species of beetle

Octuroplata uhmanni is a species of beetle in the family Chrysomelidae. It is known from the state of Goiás in Brazil and was initially described by Maurice Pic in 1933 as Uroplata uhmanni. It would be transferred to the genus Octuroplata in 1937 by Erich Uhmann and combined as Octuroplata uhmanni.
