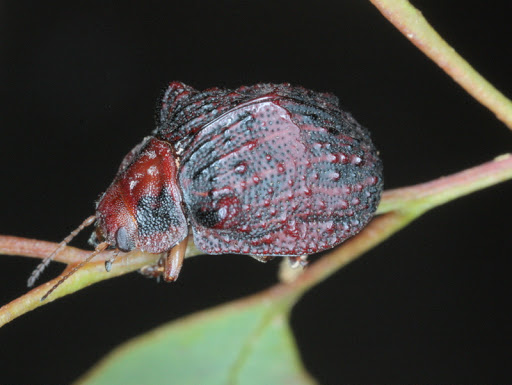
- Trachymela papuligera

Scientific classification
- Domain: Eukaryota
- Kingdom: Animalia
- Phylum: Arthropoda
- Class: Insecta
- Order: Coleoptera
- Suborder: Polyphaga
- Infraorder: Cucujiformia
- Family: Chrysomelidae
- Tribe: Chrysomelini
- Genus: Trachymela; Weise, 1908

Synonyms
- Chondromela Weise, 1915

= Trachymela =

Genus of beetles

Trachymela is a genus of beetles, commonly called leaf beetles and in the subfamily Chrysomelinae. These beetles are usually brown or black and have elytra with verrucae (bumps) and lacking striae. Trachymela can be found in all states of Australia There are over 120 species.

Trachymela is native to Australia and New Guinea and introduced elsewhere. Host-plants: Myrtaceae (Angophora, Eucalyptus, Leptospermum).

== Taxonomy ==
The genus was first described by Julius Weise in 1908. In 1994, Mauro Daccordi synonymised the genus Chondromela with Trachymela, defining it as a subgenus of Trachymela.

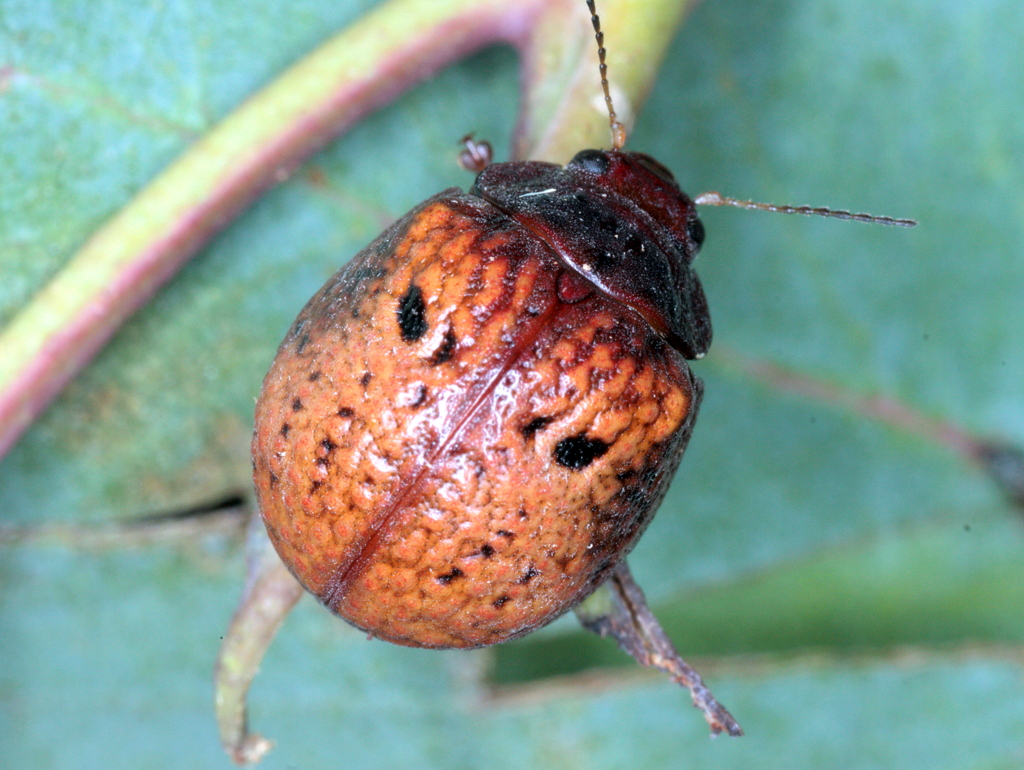
Trachymela rugosa

== Selected species ==
(From Australian Faunal Directory)

- Trachymela abjecta (Blackburn, 1896)
- Trachymela acclivis (Blackburn, 1907)
- Trachymela adelaidae (Blackburn, 1897)
- Trachymela alpina (Blackburn, 1896)
- Trachymela alta (Blackburn, 1896)
- Trachymela alticola (Blackburn, 1896)
- Trachymela arcula (Chapuis, 1877)
- Trachymela armata (Blackburn, 1896)
- Trachymela asperula (Chapuis, 1877)
- Trachymela baldiensis (Blackburn, 1896)
- Trachymela bicolora (Blackburn, 1897)
- Trachymela biondii Daccordi, 2003
- Trachymela blanda (Blackburn, 1897)
- Trachymela borealis (Blackburn, 1896)
- Trachymela brevissima (Blackburn, 1897)
- Trachymela caliginosa (Chapuis, 1877)
- Trachymela cancellata (Chapuis, 1877)
- Trachymela carpentariae (Blackburn, 1897)
- Trachymela castanea (Marsham, 1808)
- Trachymela catenata (Chapuis, 1877)
- Trachymela comma (Blackburn, 1896)
- Trachymela convexicollis (Chapuis, 1877)
- Trachymela coriaria (Chapuis, 1877)
- Trachymela corrugata (Chapuis, 1877)
- Trachymela costipennis (Chapuis, 1877)
- Trachymela creberrima (Blackburn, 1897)
- Trachymela crebra (Blackburn, 1897)
- Trachymela cristata Daccordi, 2003
- Trachymela cygnicola (Blackburn, 1897)
- Trachymela declivis (Blackburn, 1896)
- Trachymela diffusa (Chapuis, 1877)
- Trachymela echo (Blackburn, 1901)
- Trachymela exarata (Chapuis, 1877)
- Trachymela explanata (Chapuis, 1877)
- Trachymela exsul (Blackburn, 1896)
- Trachymela extranea (Blackburn, 1896)
- Trachymela ferrugata (Chapuis, 1877)
- Trachymela foveata (Blackburn, 1896)
- Trachymela fumata (Blackburn, 1897)
- Trachymela funerea (Blackburn, 1896)
- Trachymela fusconotata (Chapuis, 1877)
- Trachymela granaria (Chapuis, 1877)
- Trachymela graphica (Chapuis, 1877)
- Trachymela grossa (Blackburn, 1896)
- Trachymela hartmeyeri Weise, 1908
- Trachymela ignorata Weise, 1916
- Trachymela impressa (Chapuis, 1877)
- Trachymela inaequalis (Blackburn, 1896)
- Trachymela incurva (Clark, 1865)
- Trachymela infuscata (Chapuis, 1877)
- Trachymela ingloria Weise, 1917
- Trachymela inops (Blackburn, 1897)
- Trachymela inornata (Blackburn, 1896)
- Trachymela insolens (Blackburn, 1896)
- Trachymela interioris (Blackburn, 1896)
- Trachymela invalida (Blackburn, 1896)
- Trachymela karattae (Blackburn, 1896)
- Trachymela laeviventris (Blackburn, 1896)
- Trachymela latipes (Blackburn, 1892)
- Trachymela leai (Blackburn, 1896)
- Trachymela lima (Blackburn, 1896)
- Trachymela litigiosa (Chapuis, 1877)
- Trachymela lugubris Weise, 1916
- Trachymela lyncea Daccordi, 2003
- Trachymela maculiceps (Blackburn, 1896)
- Trachymela malevola (Blackburn, 1896)
- Trachymela mediocris (Blackburn, 1896)
- Trachymela melanospila (Chapuis, 1877)
- Trachymela mixta (Blackburn, 1896)
- Trachymela mjoebergi (Weise, 1915)
- Trachymela montuosa (Blackburn, 1896)
- Trachymela morosa (Blackburn, 1896)
- Trachymela multiseriata (Chapuis, 1877)
- Trachymela nervosa (Clark, 1865)
- Trachymela nitmiluka Daccordi, 2003
- Trachymela nodosa (Chapuis, 1877)
- Trachymela obscurella (Chapuis, 1877)
- Trachymela orbicularis (Chapuis, 1877)
- Trachymela ordinaria Weise, 1923
- Trachymela papuligera (Stål, 1860)
- Trachymela papulosa (Erichson, 1842)
- Trachymela pardalis (Chapuis, 1877)
- Trachymela perparvula (Clark, 1865)
- Trachymela piceola (Chapuis, 1877)
- Trachymela prodroma (Blackburn, 1897)
- Trachymela propria (Blackburn, 1896)
- Trachymela punctata (Marsham, 1808)
- Trachymela punctipennis (Blackburn, 1897)
- Trachymela pustulifera (Blackburn, 1896)
- Trachymela pustulosa (Blackburn, 1896)
- Trachymela raucipennis (Blackburn, 1896)
- Trachymela regularis (Blackburn, 1892)
- Trachymela rosea (Blackburn, 1896)
- Trachymela ruficollis (Blackburn, 1896)
- Trachymela rufonigra (Chapuis, 1877)
- Trachymela rugosa (Chapuis, 1877)
- Trachymela rugulosior (Blackburn, 1896)
- Trachymela rustica (Blackburn, 1896)
- Trachymela scabra (Chapuis, 1877)
- Trachymela scalaris (Chapuis, 1877)
- Trachymela semiglobosa (Chapuis, 1877)
- Trachymela seriata (Germar, 1848)
- Trachymela serpiginosa (Erichson, 1842)
- Trachymela simplex (Blackburn, 1897)
- Trachymela simulans (Blackburn, 1896)
- Trachymela sjoestedti Weise, 1916
- Trachymela sloanei (Blackburn, 1896)
- Trachymela solitaria (Blackburn, 1896)
- Trachymela sordida (Blackburn, 1896)
- Trachymela spilota (Chapuis, 1877)
- Trachymela squiresensis (Blackburn, 1893)
- Trachymela sternalis (Blackburn, 1896)
- Trachymela stigma (Blackburn, 1896)
- Trachymela strigosa (Chapuis, 1877)
- Trachymela sublimbata (Chapuis, 1877)
- Trachymela sublineata (Boheman, 1859)
- Trachymela sylvicola (Blackburn, 1896)
- Trachymela tincticollis (Blackburn, 1896)
- Trachymela verrucicollis (Chapuis, 1877)
- Trachymela verrucipennis (Clark, 1865)
- Trachymela verrucosa (Marsham, 1808)
- Trachymela versuta (Blackburn, 1897)
- Trachymela vibex (Blackburn, 1897)
- Trachymela victoriae (Blackburn, 1896)
- Trachymela vomica (Blackburn, 1896)
- Trachymela vulpina (Blackburn, 1897)
- Trachymela whittonensis (Blackburn, 1896)
