= Casmena minuta =

Scientific classification
- Kingdom: Animalia
- Phylum: Arthropoda
- Clade: Pancrustacea
- Class: Insecta
- Order: Coleoptera
- Suborder: Polyphaga
- Infraorder: Cucujiformia
- Family: Chrysomelidae
- Genus: Casmena
- Species: C. minuta

Binomial name
- Casmena minuta Pic, 1952

Species of beetle

Casmena minuta is a species of leaf beetle of the Democratic Republic of the Congo, described by Maurice Pic in 1952.
