= Xenochalepus omogerus =

Scientific classification
- Kingdom: Animalia
- Phylum: Arthropoda
- Clade: Pancrustacea
- Class: Insecta
- Order: Coleoptera
- Suborder: Polyphaga
- Infraorder: Cucujiformia
- Family: Chrysomelidae
- Genus: Xenochalepus
- Species: X. omogerus

Binomial name
- Xenochalepus omogerus (Crotch, 1873)

Synonyms
- Odontota omogera Crotch, 1873; Chalepus omoger; Odontota palliata Chapuis, 1877; Xenochalepus deficiens Uhmann, 1930; Xenochalepus subomoger Uhmann, 1937

Species of beetle

Xenochalepus omogerus is a species of beetle of the family Chrysomelidae. It is found in the United States (Arizona, Florida, New Mexico, Texas), Costa Rica, El Salvador, Mexico (Guerrero, Jalisco, Morelos, Oaxaca, Puebla, Tamaulipas, Veracruz) and Venezuela.

== Description ==
The vertex is trisulcate and the interocular space is strongly produced. There is a small rufo-fulvous patch on its anterior surface. The antennae are filiform and nearly half the length of the body. The thorax is transverse and conic, the sides obtusely angulate, bisinuate, transversely convex, flattened and transversely excavated on the hinder disc, coarsely and irregularly punctured. There is a smooth rufo-fulvous torulose vitta on either side. The elytra are elongate-ovate, slightly dilated posteriorly, the apices conjointly subacutely rounded, the apical limb distinctly dilated, broadly and deeply subquadrate-emarginate at the suture, its outer edge strongly dentate, the lateral margin serrulate. Each elytron has ten, at the extreme base with eleven, rows of punctures, the interstices between the punctures nearly plane, the second interspace strongly, the eighth moderately, costate, the basal portion of the sixth interspace also slightly elevated. At the base of each elytron is a rufo-fulvous patch, which varies greatly in size, in some specimens being confined to a small spot, in others covering nearly the whole of the anterior half of the elytron.

== Biology ==
The recorded food plants are Fabaceae species. Adults have been collected on Robinia neomexicana, Amorpha and Juglans species, Benthamantha mollis and Centrosema macrocarpum.
