= Xenochalepus mediolineatus =

Scientific classification
- Kingdom: Animalia
- Phylum: Arthropoda
- Clade: Pancrustacea
- Class: Insecta
- Order: Coleoptera
- Suborder: Polyphaga
- Infraorder: Cucujiformia
- Family: Chrysomelidae
- Genus: Xenochalepus
- Species: X. mediolineatus

Binomial name
- Xenochalepus mediolineatus (Baly, 1885)

Synonyms
- Chalepus mediolineatus Baly, 1885

Species of beetle

Xenochalepus mediolineatus is a species of beetle of the family Chrysomelidae. It is found in Mexico (Guerrero, Oaxaca).

== Description ==
The antennae are about one third the length of the body and very slightly thickened towards the apex. The thorax is nearly twice as broad as long at the base, the sides obsoletely angulate, quickly converging from the base to he apex. The upper surface is closely punctured, transversely excavated behind the middle, either side with a broad submarginal, torulose, nearly impunctate, fulvous vitta. The elytra are narrowly oblong, parallel and finely serrulate on the sides, regularly rounded at the apex, conjointly emarginate at the suture, the apical margin rather more strongly serrulate. Each elytron has ten, at the extreme base with eleven, rows of punctures, the second interspace strongly costate, the fourth and eighth interspaces, together with the suture, slightly elevated.

== Biology ==
The food plant is unknown.
