= Xenochalepus thoracicus =

Scientific classification
- Kingdom: Animalia
- Phylum: Arthropoda
- Clade: Pancrustacea
- Class: Insecta
- Order: Coleoptera
- Suborder: Polyphaga
- Infraorder: Cucujiformia
- Family: Chrysomelidae
- Genus: Xenochalepus
- Species: X. thoracicus

Binomial name
- Xenochalepus thoracicus (Fabricius, 1801)

Synonyms
- Hispa thoracicus Fabricius, 1801

Species of beetle

Xenochalepus thoracicus is a species of beetle of the family Chrysomelidae. It is found in South America, including Peru.

== Biology ==
The food plant is unknown.
