= Xenochalepus cyanura =

Scientific classification
- Kingdom: Animalia
- Phylum: Arthropoda
- Clade: Pancrustacea
- Class: Insecta
- Order: Coleoptera
- Suborder: Polyphaga
- Infraorder: Cucujiformia
- Family: Chrysomelidae
- Genus: Xenochalepus
- Species: X. cyanura

Binomial name
- Xenochalepus cyanura Blake, 1971

Species of beetle

Xenochalepus cyanura is a species of beetle of the family Chrysomelidae. It is found in the Dominican Republic and Haiti.

== Biology ==
The food plant is unknown.
