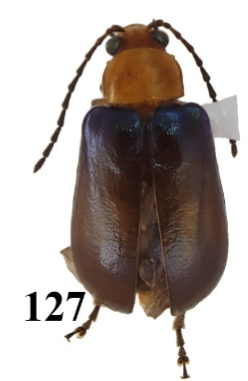

Scientific classification
- Kingdom: Animalia
- Phylum: Arthropoda
- Clade: Pancrustacea
- Class: Insecta
- Order: Coleoptera
- Suborder: Polyphaga
- Infraorder: Cucujiformia
- Family: Chrysomelidae
- Tribe: Luperini
- Subtribe: Luperina
- Genus: Scelida
- Species: S. nigricornis

Binomial name
- Scelida nigricornis (Jacoby, 1888)

Synonyms
- Cneorane nigricornis Jacoby, 1888; Scelida mimula Wilcox, 1965

= Scelida nigricornis =

Species of beetle

Scelida nigricornis is a species of leaf beetle in the family Chrysomelidae. It is found in Central America and North America.
