= Xenochalepus viridiceps =

Scientific classification
- Kingdom: Animalia
- Phylum: Arthropoda
- Clade: Pancrustacea
- Class: Insecta
- Order: Coleoptera
- Suborder: Polyphaga
- Infraorder: Cucujiformia
- Family: Chrysomelidae
- Genus: Xenochalepus
- Species: X. viridiceps

Binomial name
- Xenochalepus viridiceps (Pic, 1934)

Synonyms
- Chalepus (Xenochalepus) viridiceps Pic, 1934

Species of beetle

Xenochalepus viridiceps is a species of beetle of the family Chrysomelidae. It is found in Argentina.

== Biology ==
The recorded food plants are Phaseolus species.
