= Xenochalepus dentatus =

Scientific classification
- Kingdom: Animalia
- Phylum: Arthropoda
- Clade: Pancrustacea
- Class: Insecta
- Order: Coleoptera
- Suborder: Polyphaga
- Infraorder: Cucujiformia
- Family: Chrysomelidae
- Genus: Xenochalepus
- Species: X. dentatus

Binomial name
- Xenochalepus dentatus (Fabricius, 1787)

Synonyms
- Hispa dentatus Fabricius, 1787; Odontota lacordairei Chapuis, 1877; Hispa solitarus Voet, 1804

Species of beetle

Xenochalepus dentatus is a species of beetle of the family Chrysomelidae. It is found in Bolivia, French Guiana and Suriname.

== Biology ==
The food plant is unknown.
