= Xenochalepus gregalis =

Scientific classification
- Kingdom: Animalia
- Phylum: Arthropoda
- Clade: Pancrustacea
- Class: Insecta
- Order: Coleoptera
- Suborder: Polyphaga
- Infraorder: Cucujiformia
- Family: Chrysomelidae
- Genus: Xenochalepus
- Species: X. gregalis

Binomial name
- Xenochalepus gregalis (Pic, 1921)

Synonyms
- Chalepus (Xenochalepus) gregalis Pic, 1921

Species of beetle

Xenochalepus gregalis is a species of beetle of the family Chrysomelidae. It is found in Brazil (Amazonas) and Bolivia.

== Biology ==
The food plant is unknown.
