= Xenochalepus discointerruptus =

Scientific classification
- Kingdom: Animalia
- Phylum: Arthropoda
- Clade: Pancrustacea
- Class: Insecta
- Order: Coleoptera
- Suborder: Polyphaga
- Infraorder: Cucujiformia
- Family: Chrysomelidae
- Genus: Xenochalepus
- Species: X. discointerruptus

Binomial name
- Xenochalepus discointerruptus (Pic, 1932)

Synonyms
- Chalepus (Xenochalepus) discointerruptus Pic, 1932

Species of beetle

Xenochalepus discointerruptus is a species of beetle of the family Chrysomelidae. It is found in South America.

== Biology ==
The food plant is unknown.
