= Xenochalepus erichsoni =

Scientific classification
- Kingdom: Animalia
- Phylum: Arthropoda
- Clade: Pancrustacea
- Class: Insecta
- Order: Coleoptera
- Suborder: Polyphaga
- Infraorder: Cucujiformia
- Family: Chrysomelidae
- Genus: Xenochalepus
- Species: X. erichsoni

Binomial name
- Xenochalepus erichsoni (Weise, 1905)

Synonyms
- Chalepus erichsoni Weise, 1905

Species of beetle

Xenochalepus erichsoni is a species of beetle of the family Chrysomelidae. It is found in Brazil (Goiás).

== Biology ==
The food plant is unknown.
