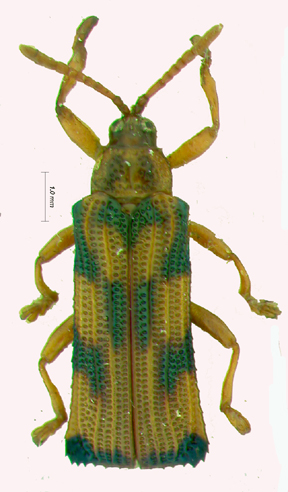

Scientific classification
- Kingdom: Animalia
- Phylum: Arthropoda
- Class: Insecta
- Order: Coleoptera
- Suborder: Polyphaga
- Infraorder: Cucujiformia
- Family: Chrysomelidae
- Tribe: Chalepini
- Genus: Octuroplata
- Species: O. walkeri

Binomial name
- Octuroplata walkeri (Baly, 1865)

Synonyms
- Uroplata walkeri Baly, 1865; Octhispa adjuncta Uhmann, 1935

= Octuroplata walkeri =

Species of beetle

Octuroplata walkeri is a species of beetle in the family Chrysomelidae. Known from Argentina, Brazil (Minas Gerais), and Paraguay, it is a leaf miner that has been documented feeding on Myrsine gardneriana and Bambusa species. It was initially described by Joseph Sugar Baly in 1865 as Uroplata walkeri but would be transferred to the genus Octuroplata in 1937 by Erich Uhmann and combined as Octuroplata walkeri. It is the only species of Octuroplata whose larval morphology has been described.
