= Xenochalepus serratus =

Scientific classification
- Kingdom: Animalia
- Phylum: Arthropoda
- Clade: Pancrustacea
- Class: Insecta
- Order: Coleoptera
- Suborder: Polyphaga
- Infraorder: Cucujiformia
- Family: Chrysomelidae
- Genus: Xenochalepus
- Species: X. serratus

Binomial name
- Xenochalepus serratus (Fabricius, 1787)

Synonyms
- Hispa serrata Fabricius, 1787

Species of beetle

Xenochalepus serratus is a species of beetle of the family Chrysomelidae. It is found in Suriname.

== Biology ==
The food plant is unknown.
