= Xenochalepus discernendus =

Scientific classification
- Kingdom: Animalia
- Phylum: Arthropoda
- Clade: Pancrustacea
- Class: Insecta
- Order: Coleoptera
- Suborder: Polyphaga
- Infraorder: Cucujiformia
- Family: Chrysomelidae
- Genus: Xenochalepus
- Species: X. discernendus

Binomial name
- Xenochalepus discernendus Uhmann, 1940

Species of beetle

Xenochalepus discernendus is a species of beetle of the family Chrysomelidae. It is found in Mexico.

== Biology ==
The food plant is unknown.
