= Xenochalepus univittatus =

Scientific classification
- Kingdom: Animalia
- Phylum: Arthropoda
- Clade: Pancrustacea
- Class: Insecta
- Order: Coleoptera
- Suborder: Polyphaga
- Infraorder: Cucujiformia
- Family: Chrysomelidae
- Genus: Xenochalepus
- Species: X. univittatus

Binomial name
- Xenochalepus univittatus (Baly, 1885)

Synonyms
- Chalepus unvittatus Baly, 1885

Species of beetle

Xenochalepus univittatus is a species of beetle of the family Chrysomelidae. It is found in Mexico (Baja California, Oaxaca, Veracruz).

== Description ==
The vertex is trisulcate and the interocular space is strongly produced. The antennae are about one third the length of the body, filiform and slightly thickened towards the apex. The thorax is transverse, the sides converging from the base to the apex, bisinuate. The upper surface is transversely convex, rather deeply excavated transversely on the hinder disc, coarsely and closely, but not very deeply, rugose-punctate. The elytra are very slightly increasing in width from the base towards the posterior angle, then subacutely rounded to the apex, conjointly quadrate-emarginate at the sutural angle, distinctly serrulate, the serratures stronger at the apex than on the sides. Each elytron has ten, at the extreme base with eleven, rows of punctures, the second interspace strongly, the fourth and the eighth more or less distinctly, costate.

== Biology ==
The food plant is unknown.
