= Xenochalepus contubernalis =

Scientific classification
- Kingdom: Animalia
- Phylum: Arthropoda
- Clade: Pancrustacea
- Class: Insecta
- Order: Coleoptera
- Suborder: Polyphaga
- Infraorder: Cucujiformia
- Family: Chrysomelidae
- Genus: Xenochalepus
- Species: X. contubernalis

Binomial name
- Xenochalepus contubernalis (Baly, 1885)

Synonyms
- Chalepus contubernalis Baly, 1885

Species of beetle

Xenochalepus contubernalis is a species of beetle of the family Chrysomelidae. It is found in Costa Rica, El Salvador, Guatemala, Mexico and Nicaragua.

== Description ==
The head is nitidous, with the front strongly trisulcate and the middle groove broad. The interocular space is strongly produced and obtuse. The antennae are subfiliform. The thorax is transverse and subconic, the sides converging from base to apex, bisinuate, the anterior and posterior angles subacute. The upper surface is transversely convex, transversely excavated on the hinder disc, strongly, coarsely, and irregularly punctured. The scutellum is quadrate-oblong. The elytra are subelongate, parallel, rounded at the apex, finely serrulate on the sides, the apical margin denticulate. Each elytron has ten, at the extreme base with eleven, regular rows of punctures, their interstices thickened, reticulate, the second and fourth rather strongly, the eighth, together with the basal portion of the sixth, less distinctly costate. The fulvous vitta which stretches from the base nearly to the middle of the elytra extends inwards from the outer border as far as the second interspace, its apex obliquely truncate.

== Biology ==
The recorded food plants are Nissolia species.
