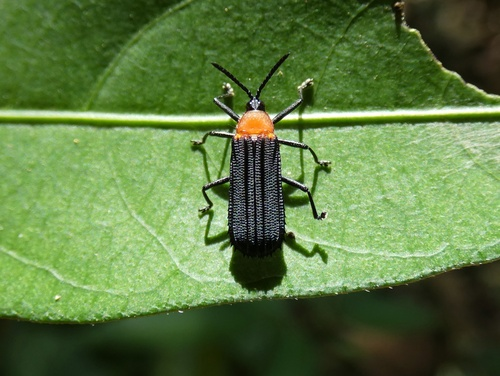

Scientific classification
- Kingdom: Animalia
- Phylum: Arthropoda
- Clade: Pancrustacea
- Class: Insecta
- Order: Coleoptera
- Suborder: Polyphaga
- Infraorder: Cucujiformia
- Family: Chrysomelidae
- Genus: Xenochalepus
- Species: X. erythroderus

Binomial name
- Xenochalepus erythroderus (Chapuis, 1877)

Synonyms
- Odontota erythrodera Chapuis, 1877; Hispa thoracica Fabricius, 1801; Chalepus haematoderus Baly, 1885

= Xenochalepus erythroderus =

Species of beetle

Xenochalepus erythroderus is a species of beetle of the family Chrysomelidae. It is found in Colombia, Costa Rica, French Guiana, Panama, Suriname and Venezuela.

== Description ==
The vertex is smooth and shining, the front subnitidous, rather strongly produced between the eyes and trisulcate. The clypeus subpentangular, rugose, impressed at the apex with two large oblique foveae. The antennae are half the length of the body and filiform. The thorax is transverse, the sides sinuate at the base, then nearly straight to the middle, then gradually converging towards the apex, anterior angle armed with a short obtuse tooth. The basal margin is deeply excavated on either side in order to receive the strongly produced basal lobes of the elytra. The elytra are subelongate, each with the basal margin produced into a strong lobe which fits, when at rest, into the corresponding basal excavation of the thorax. The sides are parallel, slightly constricted in the middle, irregularly serrulate, the serratures (fine at the base) gradually increasing in size towards the hinder angle. The apex is rounded, armed with strong acute teeth, the upper surface is convex on the sides, flattened along the suture and coarsely granulose. Each elytron has ten rows of round nitidous punctures, the second interspace raised into a strong smooth nitidous costa, the basal and apical portions of the fourth and sixth, together with the whole of the eighth, also costate, but less strongly so than the second. The legs are slender and elongate.

== Biology ==
The recorded food plants are Coussapoa nymphaeifolia, Coussapoa villosa, Cecropia insignis and Pourouma bicolor.
