= Félicien Chapuis =

Belgian doctor and entomologist (1824–1879)

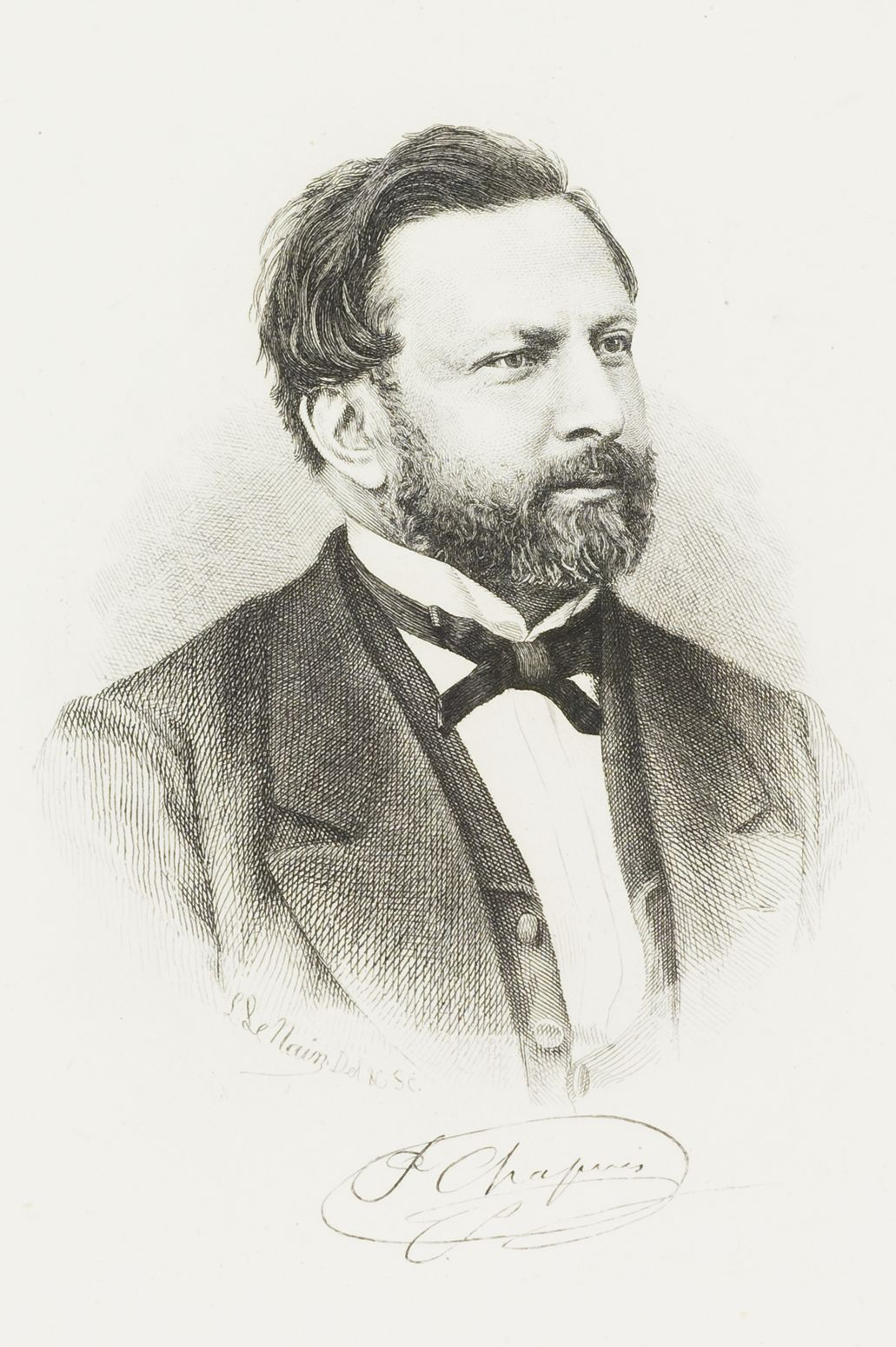
- Born: 29 April 1824; Verviers, Belgium
- Died: 30 September 1879 (aged 55); Heusy near Verviers, Belgium
- Scientific career
- Fields: Entomology

Félicien Chapuis (29 April 1824 – 30 September 1879) was a Belgian medical doctor and entomologist. He specialised in Coleoptera and finished the text of Genera des coléoptères by Théodore Lacordaire (1801—1870) when Lacordaire died.

Chapuis was born in Verviers, the son of a doctor. He studied medicine in Bonn and at the University of Liège. He received a science degree in 1848 and a medical degree from Paris in 1852. He practiced medicine in his home town. He was interested in entomology and along with Ernest Candèze he worked with Théodore Lacordaire on the study of beetle larvae.

He wrote:

- 1865 Monographie des platypides. H. Dessain, Liège.
- 1874. Histoire Naturelle des Insectes. Genera des Coléoptères. Tome 10. Libraire Encyclopédique de Roret, Paris, 455 pp., pls. 111–124. (Phytophages)
- 1875. Histoire Naturelle des Insectes. Genera des Coléoptères. Tome 11. Libraire Encyclopédique de Roret, Paris, 420 pp., pls. 125–130. (Phytophages)
- 1876. Histoire Naturelle des Insectes. Genera des Coléoptères. Tome 12. Libraire Encyclopédique de Roret, Paris, 424 pp., pls. 131–134. (Érotyliens. Endomychides, Coccinellides).
