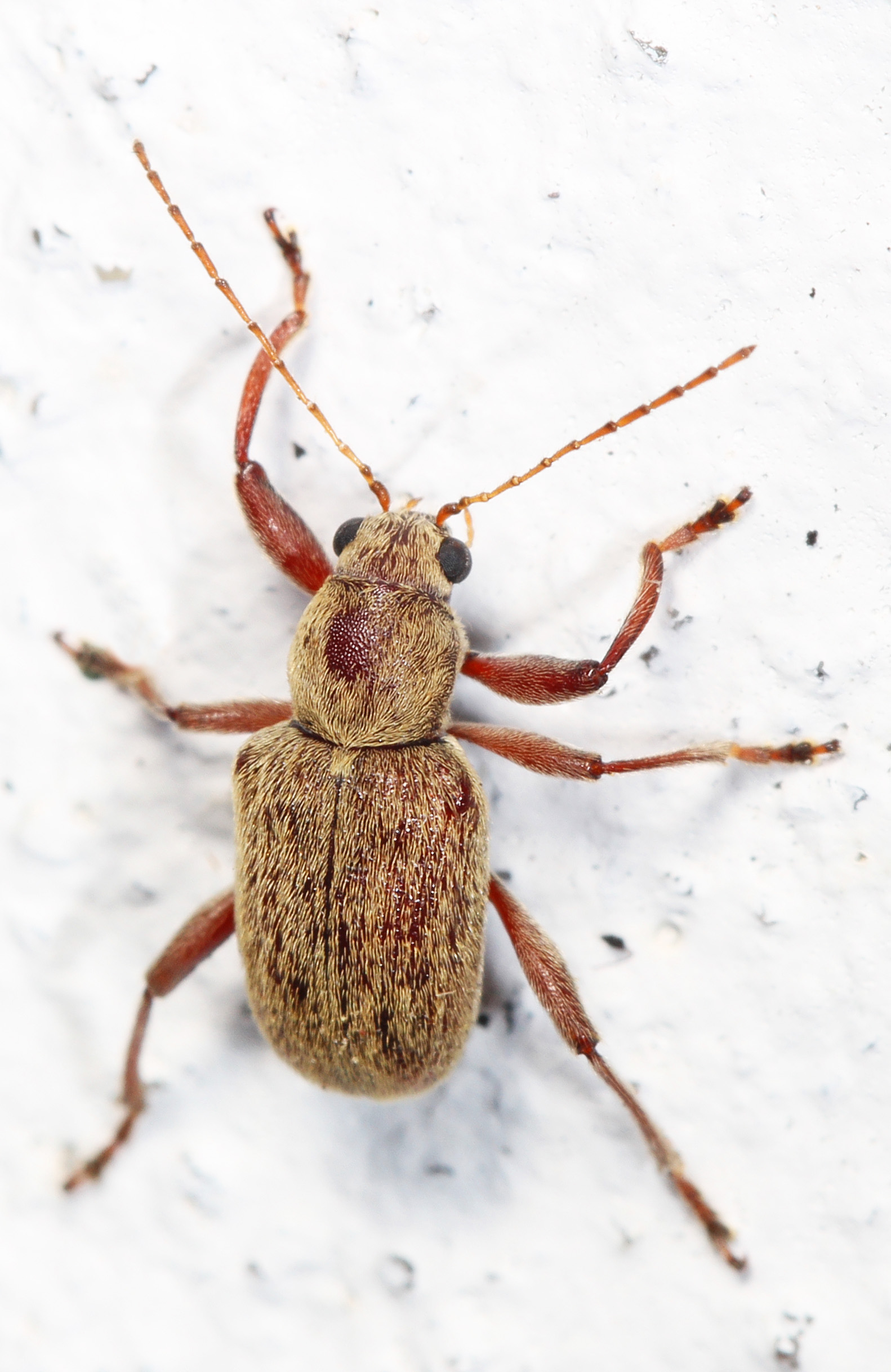
- Neofidia lurida

Scientific classification
- Kingdom: Animalia
- Phylum: Arthropoda
- Clade: Pancrustacea
- Class: Insecta
- Order: Coleoptera
- Suborder: Polyphaga
- Infraorder: Cucujiformia
- Family: Chrysomelidae
- Subfamily: Eumolpinae
- Tribe: Bromiini
- Genus: Neofidia; Strother, 2020

Type species
- Fidia lurida Baly, 1863

Synonyms
- Fidia Dejean, 1836 (nomen nudum); Atonia Gistel, 1848 (nomen nudum); Fidia Baly, 1863 (not Motschulsky, 1861); Fidea Glover, 1868 (misspelling)

= Neofidia =

Genus of leaf beetles

Neofidia (formerly known as Fidia) is a genus of leaf beetles in the subfamily Eumolpinae. It is distributed in North and Central America. There are 24 species recognised in Neofidia.

== Etymology ==
The original name for the genus, Fidia, is taken from mythology. The replacement name, Neofidia, refers to the fact it is a new name for Fidia Baly, 1863, as well as the distribution of the genus in the Nearctic and Neotropical realms.

== Taxonomic history ==
The name "Fidia" was first used in 1836 by the French entomologist Pierre François Marie Auguste Dejean in his Catalogue des Coléoptères, listing two species from the New World, F. lurida and F. murina. Because no description or indication was given for either species, they are considered nomina nuda. Likewise, Fidia Dejean is also considered a nomen nudum.

In 1861, Victor Motschulsky described a new species of beetle from Japan with the name Fidia atra. Motschulsky's species description, in combination with the generic name Fidia, constitutes an indication for the latter, thereby making the name Fidia available.

In 1863, Joseph Sugar Baly provided a description of Dejean's Fidia and Fidia lurida, making both names available (and making Fidia Baly, 1863 a junior homonym of Fidia Motschulsky, 1861). In the same work, Baly also established the Old World genera Lypesthes, with Motschulsky's Fidia atra as the type species, and Leprotes, which was later treated as a junior synonym of Lypesthes. Following Baly's work, the name Lypesthes was consistently used for the Old World genus group based on Fidia atra, while Fidia was consistently used for the New World genus group based on Fidia lurida.

An application to suppress Fidia Motschulsky, 1861 (with the year incorrectly given as "1860") and conserve usage of Fidia Baly, 1863 and Lypesthes Baly, 1863 was submitted to the ICZN in 2006. This proposal was rejected by the commission in 2009, upholding the priority of Fidia Motschulsky, 1861. Following this ruling, Fidia Baly, 1863 was renamed to Neofidia in 2020.

== Species ==
There are 24 species currently recognised in the genus Neofidia:

- Neofidia albovittata (Lefèvre, 1877) (synonyms: F. sallei Lefèvre, 1877; F. unistriata Jacoby, 1882) – southern Tamaulipas, Mexico to central Honduras
- Neofidia cana (Horn, 1892) – Texas
- Neofidia chapini (Strother, 2008) – Guerrero, Mexico
- Neofidia clematis (Schaeffer, 1904) – extreme southern Texas to central Veracruz, Mexico
- Neofidia comalensis (Strother, 2008) – Comala in Colima, Mexico
- Neofidia confusa (Strother in E. Riley, S. Clark and Seeno, 2003) – Illinois south to Louisiana, from Kansas and Oklahoma to Kentucky and Tennessee
- Neofidia convexicollis (Strother, 2008) – Texas and Oklahoma
- Neofidia costaricensis (Strother, 2008) – Costa Rica
- Neofidia delilahae (Strother, 2008) – Alabama and Mississippi
- Neofidia dicelloposthe (Strother, 2008) – Tejupilco in Mexico State, Mexico
- Neofidia dichroma (Strother, 2008) – Guatemala and Chiapas, Mexico
- Neofidia guatemalensis (Jacoby, 1879) – Belize, El Salvador, Guatemala
- Neofidia humeralis (Lefèvre, 1877) – Arizona and New Mexico south to Oaxaca, Mexico
- Neofidia longipes (F. E. Melsheimer, 1847) – east of the Appalachian Mountains
- Neofidia lurida (Baly, 1863) (synonym: Fidia viticida Walsh, 1867) – Grape rootworm; found throughout eastern North America
- Neofidia marraverpa (Strother, 2008) – Oaxaca, Mexico
- Neofidia papillata (Strother, 2008) – Hidalgo, Mexico
- Neofidia pedestris (Lefèvre, 1877) – along Sierra Madre Oriental in eastern Mexico, from Hidalgo to Oaxaca
- Neofidia pedinops (Strother, 2008) – Alabama, Florida and Georgia
- Neofidia rileyorum (Strother, 2008) – southwestern United States, west of the Appalachian Mountains
- Neofidia spuria (Lefèvre, 1877) (synonym: F. atra Jacoby, 1882) – Sierra Madre del Sur in Guerrero and Oaxaca, Mexico
- Neofidia texana (Schaeffer, 1934) – Texas
- Neofidia tibialis (Jacoby, 1890) – Mexico
- Neofidia xanthonioides (Strother, 2008) – Sierra Madre del Sur in Mexico

Fidia murina Glover, 1868 is considered a nomen dubium.

Fidia lateralis Jacoby, 1882 was transferred to Xanthonia.
