= Mordellistena liturata =

Scientific classification
- Domain: Eukaryota
- Kingdom: Animalia
- Phylum: Arthropoda
- Class: Insecta
- Order: Coleoptera
- Suborder: Polyphaga
- Infraorder: Cucujiformia
- Family: Mordellidae
- Genus: Mordellistena
- Species: M. liturata

Binomial name
- Mordellistena liturata (Melsheimer, 1845)

Synonyms
- Mordella liturata Melsheimer, 1845

Species of beetle

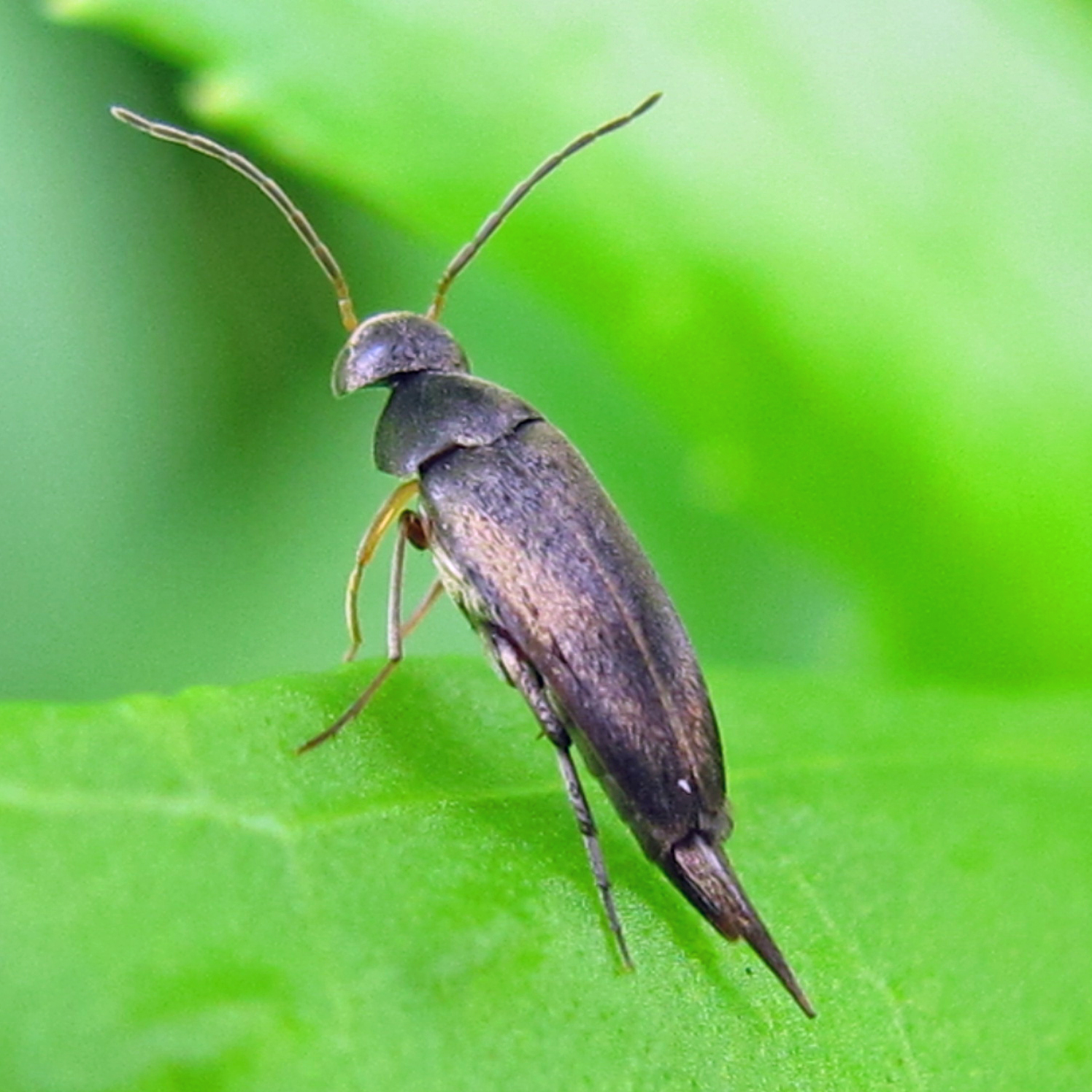
A member of the Mordellistena species.

Mordellistena liturata is a beetle in the genus Mordellistena of the family Mordellidae. It was described in 1845 by Frederick Ernst Melsheimer. It is found in gardens and is just over 4 millimetres (0.16 in) in length and has a 1 millimetre (0.039 in) tail.
