= Frederick Melsheimer =

Frederick Melsheimer may refer to:

- Frederick Valentine Melsheimer (1749–1814), Lutheran clergyman and American entomologist
- Frederick Ernst Melsheimer (1782–1873), American entomologist
