= Mordellistena fuscipennis =

Scientific classification
- Domain: Eukaryota
- Kingdom: Animalia
- Phylum: Arthropoda
- Class: Insecta
- Order: Coleoptera
- Suborder: Polyphaga
- Infraorder: Cucujiformia
- Family: Mordellidae
- Genus: Mordellistena
- Species: M. fuscipennis

Binomial name
- Mordellistena fuscipennis (Melsheimer, 1845)

Synonyms
- Mordella fuscipennis Melsheimer, 1845; Mordellistena pityptera LeConte, 1862

Species of beetle

Mordellistena fuscipennis is a beetle in the genus Mordellistena of the family Mordellidae. It was described in 1845 by Frederick Ernst Melsheimer.
