= Xanthonia villosula =

Scientific classification
- Kingdom: Animalia
- Phylum: Arthropoda
- Clade: Pancrustacea
- Class: Insecta
- Order: Coleoptera
- Suborder: Polyphaga
- Infraorder: Cucujiformia
- Family: Chrysomelidae
- Genus: Xanthonia
- Species: X. villosula

Binomial name
- Xanthonia villosula (F. E. Melsheimer, 1847)

Synonyms
- Eumolpus villosus F. V. Melsheimer, 1806 (nomen nudum); Eumolpus villosulus F. E. Melsheimer, 1847; Eumolpus plagiatus F. E. Melsheimer, 1847

Species of beetle

Xanthonia villosula is a species of leaf beetle. It is found in the eastern United States and eastern Canada (Ontario, Quebec, New Brunswick and Nova Scotia). It is associated with numerous woody plants including oaks.

Xanthonia villosula measures 2.8–3.5 mm (0.11–0.14 in) in length. The dorsal ground color is light reddish brown.
