= Graphops =

Scientific classification
- Kingdom: Animalia
- Phylum: Arthropoda
- Clade: Pancrustacea
- Class: Insecta
- Order: Coleoptera
- Suborder: Polyphaga
- Infraorder: Cucujiformia
- Family: Chrysomelidae
- Subfamily: Eumolpinae
- Tribe: Typophorini
- Genus: Graphops; LeConte, 1884

Type species
- Heteraspis nebulosa LeConte, 1859

Synonyms
- Heteraspis LeConte, 1859 (preoccupied); Phortus Weise, 1899

Genus of leaf beetles

Graphops is a genus of leaf beetles in the subfamily Eumolpinae. There are 19 described species in Graphops, all from North America. Most species have limited flight capabilities, due to poorly developed wings, and at least one species is known to be flightless.

According to BugGuide and ITIS, the genus is now placed in the tribe Typophorini instead of Adoxini.

== Species ==
These 19 species belong to the genus Graphops:

- Graphops barberi Blake, 1955^{i c g}
- Graphops beryllina LeConte, 1884^{i c g b}
- Graphops cavani Clark & Heninger, 2016
- Graphops comosa Blake, 1955^{i c g b} (Monahans sandhill chrysomelid)
- Graphops curtipennis (F. E. Melsheimer, 1847)^{i c g b}
- Graphops exilis Blake, 1955^{i c g}
- Graphops floridana Blake, 1955^{i c g}
- Graphops marcassita (Crotch, 1873)^{i c g b}
- Graphops nebulosa (LeConte, 1859)^{i c g b}
- Graphops nigella Blake, 1955^{i c g b}
- Graphops obscura LeConte, 1884^{i c g}
- Graphops pubescens (F. E. Melsheimer, 1847)^{i c g b}
- Graphops punctata Blake, 1955^{i c g}
- Graphops simplex LeConte, 1884^{i c g b}
- Graphops smaragdula (LeConte, 1859)^{i c g}
- Graphops tenuis Blake, 1955^{i c g}
- Graphops varians LeConte, 1884^{i c g}
- Graphops viridis Blake, 1955^{i c g b}
- Graphops wyomingensis Blake, 1955^{i c g}

Data sources: i = ITIS, c = Catalogue of Life, g = GBIF, b = Bugguide.net

Doubtful species:

- Graphops bicolor (Lefèvre, 1877)
- Graphops cupraea (Provancher, 1878)
