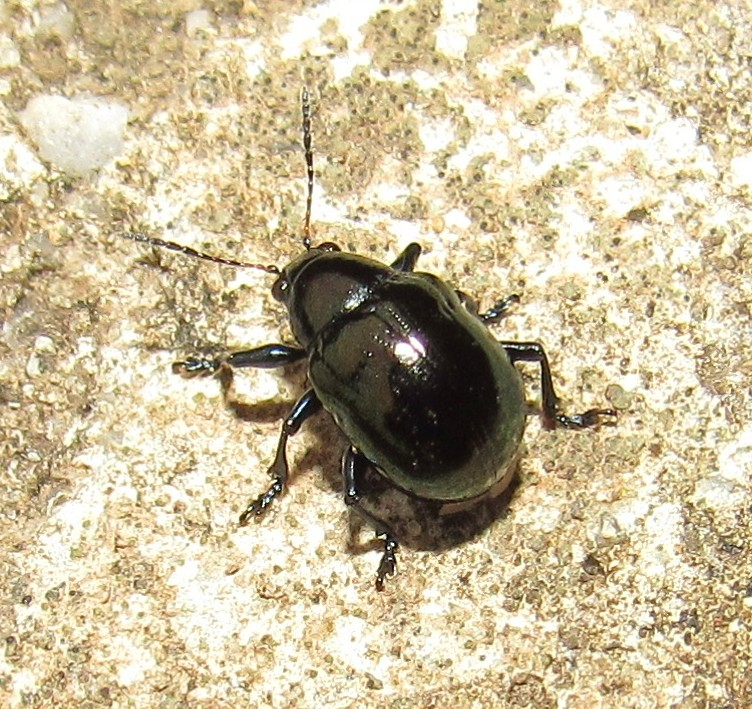
- Typophorus nigritus, Brazil

Scientific classification
- Kingdom: Animalia
- Phylum: Arthropoda
- Clade: Pancrustacea
- Class: Insecta
- Order: Coleoptera
- Suborder: Polyphaga
- Infraorder: Cucujiformia
- Family: Chrysomelidae
- Subfamily: Eumolpinae
- Tribe: Typophorini
- Genus: Typophorus; Chevrolat in Dejean, 1836

Type species
- Eumolpus nigritus Fabricius, 1801

Synonyms
- Hydrotica Gistel, 1848; Polisma Gistel, 1848

= Typophorus =

Genus of leaf beetles from North and South America

Typophorus is a genus of leaf beetles in the subfamily Eumolpinae. There are at least 52 described species in Typophorus. Similar genera include Paria and Tijucana. Typophorus itself is probably polyphyletic.

Two subspecies of Typophorus nigritus, T. nigritus nitidulus and T. nigritus viridicyaneus, are known as pests of sweet potatoes.

== Species ==
- Typophorus annulatus Lefèvre, 1877
- Typophorus apicicornis Jacoby, 1891
- Typophorus appendiculatus Bechyné, 1948
- Typophorus atomarius Lefèvre, 1884
- Typophorus basalis Baly, 1859
- Typophorus biplagiatus Boheman, 1858
- Typophorus bisignatus Lefèvre, 1876
- Typophorus bohumilae Bechyné, 1951
- Typophorus centromaculatus Lefèvre, 1888
- Typophorus cyanipennis Lefèvre, 1876
- Typophorus diomedes Bechyné, 1955
- Typophorus erythocephalus Jacoby, 1882
- Typophorus exaequatus Bechyné, 1951
- Typophorus exilis Lefèvre, 1878
- Typophorus fasciatus (Germar, 1824)
- Typophorus florigradus Bechyné & Bechyné, 1961
- Typophorus furvus Lefèvre, 1885
- Typophorus inflatus Bechyné, 1958
- Typophorus intermedius Lefèvre, 1876
- Typophorus interstitalis Jacoby, 1891
- Typophorus jacobyi Lefèvre, 1884
  - Typophorus jacobyi atramentaria (Weise, 1921)
  - Typophorus jacobyi jacobyi Lefèvre, 1884
- Typophorus kuscheli Bechyné, 1951
- Typophorus lar (Fabricius, 1787)
- Typophorus limbatus Jacoby, 1891
- Typophorus maculigera (Lefèvre, 1888)
- Typophorus mansuetus Bechyné & Bechyné, 1961
- Typophorus melanocephalus Jacoby, 1876
- Typophorus mexicanus Jacoby, 1876
- Typophorus minutus Lefèvre, 1876
- Typophorus nanus Lefèvre, 1877
- Typophorus nigra (Weise, 1921)
- Typophorus nigricollis Jacoby, 1882
- Typophorus nigritarsis (Jacoby, 1882)
- Typophorus nigritus (Fabricius, 1801)
  - Typophorus nigritus chalceus Lefèvre, 1877
  - Typophorus nigritus coronadoi Bechyné, 1948
  - Typophorus nigritus cretifer Bechyné, 1953
  - Typophorus nigritus erbeni Bechyné, 1948
  - Typophorus nigritus interpositus Bechyné, 1951
  - Typophorus nigritus lucens Bechyné, 1953
  - Typophorus nigritus molnari Bechyné, 1953
  - Typophorus nigritus nigritus (Fabricius, 1801)
  - Typophorus nigritus nitidulus (Fabricius, 1801)
  - Typophorus nigritus obliquus Baly, 1859
  - Typophorus nigritus paradoxus Jacoby, 1882
  - Typophorus nigritus punctatissimus Bechyné, 1948
  - Typophorus nigritus viridicyaneus (Crotch, 1873) (sweetpotato leaf beetle)
- Typophorus picimanus Lefèvre, 1877
- Typophorus pumilus (LeConte, 1859)
- Typophorus purulenis Jacoby, 1882
- Typophorus pygmaeus Lefèvre, 1884
- Typophorus quinquemaculatus Erichson, 1847
- Typophorus rufipes Lefèvre, 1877
- Typophorus santaremus Bechyné, 1955
- Typophorus scheerpeltzi Bechyné, 1951
- Typophorus sericeus Bechyné, 1948
- Typophorus signatus Lefèvre, 1891
- Typophorus simplex Lefèvre, 1884
- Typophorus spadiceus Lefèvre, 1876
- Typophorus steinheili Lefèvre, 1878
- Typophorus subbrunneus Jacoby, 1882
- Typophorus sulcifer Bechyné, 1954
- Typophorus tarsalis Lefèvre, 1888
- Typophorus tibialis Lefèvre, 1877
- Typophorus variabilis Jacoby, 1882

incertae sedis species:

- Typophorus variabilis (Fabricius, 1801)

Species moved to Paria:

- Typophorus aeneipennis Baly, 1878
- Typophorus atripennis Lefèvre, 1878
- Typophorus corumbanus Bechyné, 1951
- Typophorus epimeralis Bechyné, 1955
- Typophorus erythopus Lefèvre, 1888
- Typophorus festinatus Bechyné, 1950
- Typophorus fulvipennis Lefèvre, 1884
- Typophorus geniculatus Lefèvre, 1878
- Typophorus horvathi Bechyné, 1955
- Typophorus montanellus Bechyné, 1951
- Typophorus nigripennis Lefèvre, 1884
- Typophorus nigronotatus Lefèvre, 1877
- Typophorus pusillus Lefèvre, 1876
- Typophorus quadriplagiatus Jacoby, 1876
- Typophorus tinctus Bechyné, 1957

Species moved to Entreriosa:

- Typophorus umbratus Lefèvre, 1877

Synonyms:

- Typophorus histrio Lefèvre, 1877: synonym of Paria opacicollis LeConte, 1859
- Typophorus nobilis Lefèvre, 1877: synonym of Typophorus basalis Baly, 1859
- Typophorus sturmi Lefèvre, 1877: synonym of Typophorus nigritus chalceus Lefèvre, 1877
- Typophorus versutus Lefèvre, 1877: synonym of Typophorus nigritus nitidulus (Fabricius, 1801)
