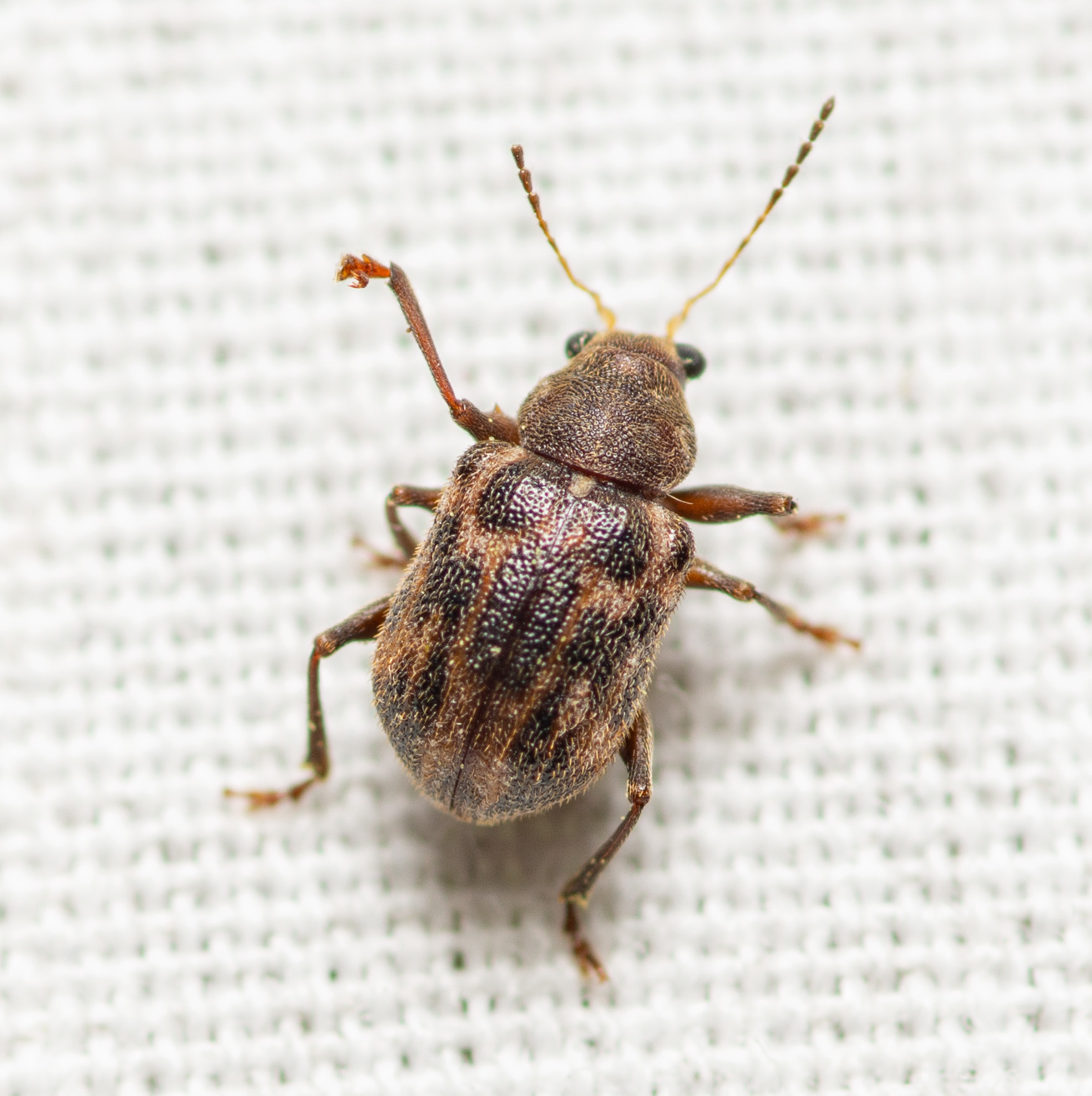
- Xanthonia picturata

Scientific classification
- Kingdom: Animalia
- Phylum: Arthropoda
- Clade: Pancrustacea
- Class: Insecta
- Order: Coleoptera
- Suborder: Polyphaga
- Infraorder: Cucujiformia
- Family: Chrysomelidae
- Subfamily: Eumolpinae
- Tribe: Bromiini
- Genus: Xanthonia; Baly, 1863

Type species
- Xanthonia stevensi Baly, 1863

Synonyms
- Icogramma Weise, 1922; Microlypesthes Pic, 1936

= Xanthonia =

Genus of leaf beetles

Xanthonia is a genus of leaf beetles in the subfamily Eumolpinae. It is distributed in North and Central America, and in East, Southeast and South Asia.

== Species ==
Species include:

- Xanthonia angulata Staines & Weisman, 2001 – United States
- Xanthonia collaris Chen, 1940 – China
- Xanthonia coomani (Pic, 1936) – Thailand, Vietnam
- Xanthonia decemnotata (Say, 1824) – Canada, United States
- Xanthonia dentata Staines & Weisman, 2002 – southwestern United States
- Xanthonia dorsalis Chûjô, 1966 – Nepal
- Xanthonia flavescens Tan, 1988 – Southwestern China (Xizang)
- Xanthonia flavoannulata Blake, 1954 – Mexico
- Xanthonia foveata Tan, 1992 – Southwestern China (Yunnan)
- Xanthonia fulva Takizawa, 1987 – Nepal
- Xanthonia furcata Staines & Weisman, 2001 – United States
- Xanthonia glabra Medvedev, 2002 – Philippines
- Xanthonia glabrata Tan, 1992 – Southwestern China (Yunnan)
- Xanthonia guatemalensis Jacoby, 1882 – Mexico, Guatemala
- Xanthonia hirsuta Weisman, 2019 – southern United States (Texas)
- Xanthonia insularis Medvedev & Takizawa, 2011 – Bali
- Xanthonia intermedia Staines & Weisman, 2001 – United States
- Xanthonia jacobyi Clavareau, 1914 – Guatemala
- Xanthonia lateralis (Jacoby, 1882) – Mexico
- Xanthonia lineigera (Weise, 1922) – Philippines
- Xanthonia marmorata Jacoby, 1882 – Mexico, Guatemala, Panama
- Xanthonia marquai Riley & Quinn, 2019 – southern United States (Texas)
- Xanthonia minuta (Pic, 1929) – Southern China, Vietnam, Thailand
- Xanthonia monticola Staines & Weisman, 2001 – eastern United States
- Xanthonia morimotoi Kimoto & Gressitt, 1982 – Thailand
- Xanthonia nepalensis Takizawa, 1987 – Nepal
- Xanthonia nigrofasciata Jacoby, 1882 – Guatemala
- Xanthonia nitida Weisman, 2019 – southern United States (Texas)
- Xanthonia oblonga Takizawa & Basu, 1987 – East India (Darjeeling), Nepal
- Xanthonia parva Riley & Quinn, 2019 – southern United States (Texas)
- Xanthonia picturata Weisman & Riley, 2019 – southern United States (Texas)
- Xanthonia pilosa Staines & Weisman, 2002 – western United States
- Xanthonia pinicola Schaeffer, 1933 – southern United States
- Xanthonia placida Baly, 1874 – Japan, South Korea
- Xanthonia querci Weisman, 2019 – southern United States (Texas)
- Xanthonia serrata Staines & Weisman, 2001 – United States
- Xanthonia signata Chen, 1935 – China
- Xanthonia similis Tan, 1992 – Southwestern China (Yunnan)
- Xanthonia sinica Chen, 1935 – China
- Xanthonia stevensi Baly, 1863 – Canada, United States
- Xanthonia striata Staines & Weisman, 2001 – United States
- Xanthonia striatipennis Kimoto, 1969 – Taiwan
- Xanthonia taiwana Chûjô, 1956 – Taiwan
- Xanthonia texana Weisman, 2019 – southern United States (Texas)
- Xanthonia tuberosa Jacoby, 1882 – Mexico
- Xanthonia umbilicata Bechyné, 1955 – Mexico
- Xanthonia vagans (LeConte, 1884) – southern United States, Mexico
- Xanthonia varipennis Chen, 1940 – Southern China (Guangxi)
- Xanthonia villosula (F. E. Melsheimer, 1847) – Canada, United States
