= Neofidia longipes =

Scientific classification
- Kingdom: Animalia
- Phylum: Arthropoda
- Clade: Pancrustacea
- Class: Insecta
- Order: Coleoptera
- Suborder: Polyphaga
- Infraorder: Cucujiformia
- Family: Chrysomelidae
- Genus: Neofidia
- Species: N. longipes

Binomial name
- Neofidia longipes (F. E. Melsheimer, 1847)

Synonyms
- Eumolpus longipes F. E. Melsheimer, 1847; Pachnephorus viticolus Uhler, 1855

Species of beetle

Neofidia longipes is a species of leaf beetle that is found in North America. It occurs mostly east of the Appalachian Mountains. It is associated with plants such as Ilex opaca (Aquifoliaceae), soybeans (Fabaceae), Salix (Salicaceae), and various Vitaceae including Ampelopsis arborea, Parthenocissus quinquefolia, and various species in the genus Vitis.

Neofidia longipes is very similar to the species Neofidia rileyorum, and females of the two species cannot be distinguished without associated males. The two species are also sympatric along the Appalachian Mountains, as well as in central Ohio and in central Alabama.
