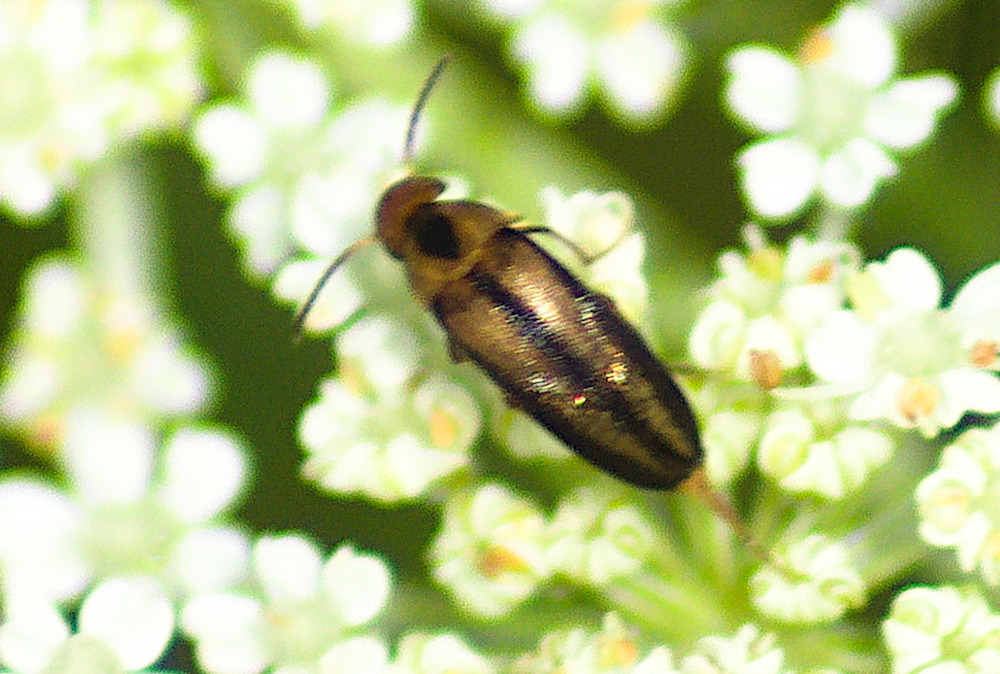

Scientific classification
- Domain: Eukaryota
- Kingdom: Animalia
- Phylum: Arthropoda
- Class: Insecta
- Order: Coleoptera
- Suborder: Polyphaga
- Infraorder: Cucujiformia
- Family: Mordellidae
- Genus: Mordellistena
- Species: M. limbalis

Binomial name
- Mordellistena limbalis (Melsheimer, 1846)

Synonyms
- Mordella limbalis Melsheimer, 1846

= Mordellistena limbalis =

Species of beetle

Mordellistena limbalis is a beetle in the genus Mordellistena of the family Mordellidae. It was described in 1846 by Frederick Valentine Melsheimer.
