= Graphops pubescens =

Scientific classification
- Kingdom: Animalia
- Phylum: Arthropoda
- Clade: Pancrustacea
- Class: Insecta
- Order: Coleoptera
- Suborder: Polyphaga
- Infraorder: Cucujiformia
- Family: Chrysomelidae
- Genus: Graphops
- Species: G. pubescens

Binomial name
- Graphops pubescens (F. E. Melsheimer, 1847)

Synonyms
- Eumolpus pubescens F. E. Melsheimer, 1847

Species of beetle

Graphops pubescens is a species of leaf beetle. It is found in North America.
