= Xanthonia pilosa =

Scientific classification
- Kingdom: Animalia
- Phylum: Arthropoda
- Clade: Pancrustacea
- Class: Insecta
- Order: Coleoptera
- Suborder: Polyphaga
- Infraorder: Cucujiformia
- Family: Chrysomelidae
- Genus: Xanthonia
- Species: X. pilosa

Binomial name
- Xanthonia pilosa Staines & Weisman, 2002

Species of beetle

Xanthonia pilosa is a species of leaf beetle. It is found in the Southwestern United States in Arizona and Utah.

Xanthonia pilosa measures 2.9–3.2 mm (0.11–0.13 in) in length. The elytra are reddish brown with darker spots.
