= Graphops curtipennis =

Scientific classification
- Kingdom: Animalia
- Phylum: Arthropoda
- Clade: Pancrustacea
- Class: Insecta
- Order: Coleoptera
- Suborder: Polyphaga
- Infraorder: Cucujiformia
- Family: Chrysomelidae
- Genus: Graphops
- Species: G. curtipennis

Binomial name
- Graphops curtipennis (F. E. Melsheimer, 1847)

Synonyms
- Eumolpus curtipennis F. E. Melsheimer, 1847; Phortus creticus Weise, 1899

Species of beetle

Graphops curtipennis is a species of leaf beetle. It is found in North America.

According to Daccordi in 1977, the species Phortus creticus, which was originally reported from the island of Crete in Greece, is actually a synonym of Graphops curtipennis, and is not actually found on the island.

== Subspecies ==
These two subspecies belong to the species Graphops curtipennis:

- Graphops curtipennis curtipennis (F. E. Melsheimer, 1847)^{i c g}
- Graphops curtipennis schwarzi Blake, 1955^{i c g}

Data sources: i = ITIS, c = Catalogue of Life, g = GBIF, b = Bugguide.net
