= Mordellistena aspersa =

Scientific classification
- Domain: Eukaryota
- Kingdom: Animalia
- Phylum: Arthropoda
- Class: Insecta
- Order: Coleoptera
- Suborder: Polyphaga
- Infraorder: Cucujiformia
- Family: Mordellidae
- Genus: Mordellistena
- Species: M. aspersa

Binomial name
- Mordellistena aspersa (Melsheimer, 1846)

Synonyms
- Mordella aspersa Melsheimer, 1846; Mordellistena rubrilabris Helmuth, 1864

Species of beetle

Mordellistena aspersa is a beetle in the genus Mordellistena of the family Mordellidae. It was described in 1846 by Frederick Valentine Melsheimer.
