= Daniel Ziegler =

American entomologist (1804–1876)

- Born: June 11, 1804; Reading, Pennsylvania
- Died: May 23, 1876 (aged 71); York, Pennsylvania
- Scientific career
- Fields: Entomology
- Workplaces: Religious minister (Kreutz Creek); Religious minister (York)

Rev. Daniel Ziegler (June 11, 1804 Reading, Pennsylvania – May 23, 1876 York, Pennsylvania) was a minister in Kreutz Creek and York, Pennsylvania, and also an avid entomologist. He was a friend of Dr. Frederick Ernst Melsheimer (1782–1873), who like his father the Rev. Frederick Valentine Melsheimer (1749–1814), was also a keen entomologist. Their collections ended up in Harvard University's Museum of Comparative Zoology, and comprised 14,774 specimens from 5,302 different species.

Ziegler studied at the University of Pennsylvania and, later, theology at the German Reformed Seminary in York. He was the minister for 37 years of Kraeutz-Creek Church near York as well as up to eight other churches. With his wife, Eve Eyster, he had 10 children, including son Dr. H. A. Ziegler.

It was during his time as minister at Kraeutz-Creek that he began studying entomology. He often accompanied his father on insect-collecting excursions, using the beat net method of collecting, uncommon in America at the time.

Rev. Ziegler's only entomological paper, a description of 36 new species of Coleoptera, was published for the assistance of Dr. Melsheimer, whose home was close to one of Rev. Ziegler's churches.

There was nothing whatever eventful in his life, and besides his few entomological contributions, he was nothing more than a plain, plodding, honest country parson.

— J. G. Morris
