= Xanthonia furcata =

Scientific classification
- Kingdom: Animalia
- Phylum: Arthropoda
- Clade: Pancrustacea
- Class: Insecta
- Order: Coleoptera
- Suborder: Polyphaga
- Infraorder: Cucujiformia
- Family: Chrysomelidae
- Genus: Xanthonia
- Species: X. furcata

Binomial name
- Xanthonia furcata Staines & Weisman, 2001

Species of beetle

Xanthonia furcata is a species of leaf beetle. It is found in the southern and eastern United States. It is associated with wild cherry and oaks. The specific name comes from the Latin furca, meaning "fork".

== Distribution ==
X. furcata is distributed in Illinois, Missouri, Texas and Oklahoma.

== Description ==
Xanthonia furcata measures 2.8–3.5 mm (0.11–0.14 in) in length. The elytra are reddish brown with darker spots.
