= Xanthonia dentata =

Scientific classification
- Kingdom: Animalia
- Phylum: Arthropoda
- Clade: Pancrustacea
- Class: Insecta
- Order: Coleoptera
- Suborder: Polyphaga
- Infraorder: Cucujiformia
- Family: Chrysomelidae
- Genus: Xanthonia
- Species: X. dentata

Binomial name
- Xanthonia dentata Staines & Weisman, 2002

Species of beetle

Xanthonia dentata is a species of leaf beetle. Its range spans Arizona, Colorado, New Mexico and Texas, and possibly Kansas. It is associated with oaks.

Xanthonia dentata measures 2.8–3.4 mm (0.11–0.13 in) in length. The elytra are dark reddish brown to medium brownish with black spots.
