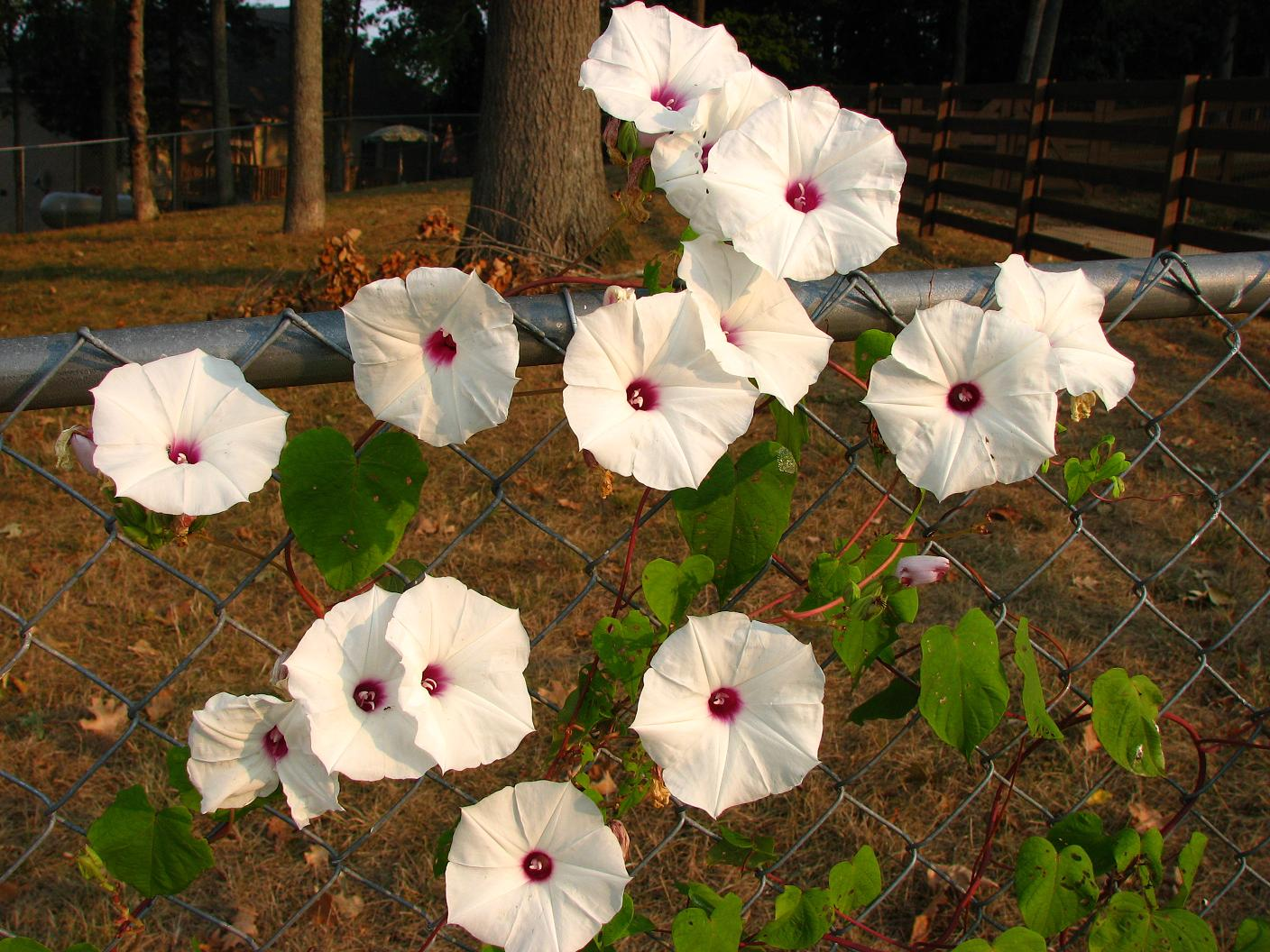
- In bloom

Scientific classification
- Kingdom: Plantae
- Clade: Tracheophytes
- Clade: Angiosperms
- Clade: Eudicots
- Clade: Asterids
- Order: Solanales
- Family: Convolvulaceae
- Genus: Ipomoea
- Species: I. pandurata

Binomial name
- Ipomoea pandurata (L.) G.F.W.Mey.

= Ipomoea pandurata =

Species of flowering plant

Ipomoea pandurata, known as man of the earth, wild potato vine, manroot, wild sweet potato, is a species of herbaceous perennial vine native to North America. It is a twining plant of woodland verges and rough places with heart-shaped leaves and funnel-shaped white flowers with a pinkish throat. The large tuberous roots can be roasted and eaten, or can be used to make a poultice or infusion. When uncooked, the roots have purgative properties.

== Description ==
I. pandurata is a twining and scrambling vine that can reach 30 ft (9 m). The stems are usually hairless and bear alternate, olive-green, cordate leaves, about 6 in (15 cm) long, with long, purple-tinged petioles. The flowers develop in the axils of the leaves in groups of one to five. The sepals are light green and hairless, and overlap one another. The flowers are tubular, white with a pinkish or purplish throat. The corolla is five-lobed, some 2.5 to 3 in (6.4 to 7.6 cm) long and wide. The stamens form a white boss in the middle of the throat. Flowers open overnight and close, on a sunny day, about mid-day, but last longer in cloudy weather. They are followed by capsules containing two to four flat seeds which are noticeably hairy along their outer edges.

== Distribution and habitat ==
The native range is the southern and eastern parts of the United States, extending northwards into Ontario in Canada. Habitats include upland woods, the edges of prairies bordering woodlands, thickets, rocky gullies and stream-sides, disturbed ground, and railway and highway verges.

== Ecology ==
Long-tongued bees such as honey bees, bumblebees and digger bees visit I. pandurata seeking nectar, as do various butterflies and moths. Tortoise beetles (subfamily Cassidinae) of various sorts and the sweet potato leaf beetle (Typophorus nigritus) feed on the leaves. The larvae of the latter two beetles feed on the swollen tuberous roots, while the larvae of the sweet potato leaf miner moth (Bedellia somnulentella), the morning-glory plume moth (Emmelina monodactyla) and the sweetpotato hornworm (Agrius cingulata) feed on the foliage. Mammalian herbivorous animals avoid this plant which tastes bitter and is toxic to some extent. Ipomoea pandurata is insect pollinated and is recorded to have been visited in northern Florida by Melitoma taurea, and Ptilothrix bombiformis.

== Uses ==
The root of this plant produces a large edible tuber that can be as much as 75 cm (30 in) long and 12 cm (5 in) thick, weighing up to 10 kg (22 lb)., with other sources alleging even larger sizes. This can be roasted and eaten, resembling a sweet potato, young specimens being best as older tubers may be bitter. Other uses for the plant include the preparation of a poultice from the roots which can be used to ease pain in rheumatic joints. The roots are also used to prepare an infusion that is said to have expectorant, diuretic and laxative effects.
