= Neofidia texana =

Scientific classification
- Kingdom: Animalia
- Phylum: Arthropoda
- Clade: Pancrustacea
- Class: Insecta
- Order: Coleoptera
- Suborder: Polyphaga
- Infraorder: Cucujiformia
- Family: Chrysomelidae
- Genus: Neofidia
- Species: N. texana

Binomial name
- Neofidia texana (Schaeffer, 1934)

Synonyms
- Fidia viticida var. texana Schaeffer, 1934

Species of beetle

Neofidia texana is a species of leaf beetle that is found in North America. It occurs in central and east-central Texas, and is associated with plants in the grape family (Vitaceae). Neofidia texana was first described as a variety of Fidia viticida by the American entomologist Charles Frederic August Schaeffer in 1934. It is now considered to be a separate species.
