= Xanthonia angulata =

Scientific classification
- Kingdom: Animalia
- Phylum: Arthropoda
- Clade: Pancrustacea
- Class: Insecta
- Order: Coleoptera
- Suborder: Polyphaga
- Infraorder: Cucujiformia
- Family: Chrysomelidae
- Genus: Xanthonia
- Species: X. angulata

Binomial name
- Xanthonia angulata Staines & Weisman, 2001

Species of beetle

Xanthonia angulata is a species of leaf beetle. It is found in North America. It is associated with oaks. The specific name comes from the Latin angulatus, meaning "with angles".

== Distribution ==
X. angulata is distributed from Maryland to Kansas. It has also been recorded from Arkansas, Oklahoma and Texas.

== Description ==
Xanthonia angulata measures 3.5–4 mm (0.14–0.16 in) in length. The elytra are uniformly medium brown.
