= Mordella undulata =

Scientific classification
- Domain: Eukaryota
- Kingdom: Animalia
- Phylum: Arthropoda
- Class: Insecta
- Order: Coleoptera
- Suborder: Polyphaga
- Infraorder: Cucujiformia
- Family: Mordellidae
- Genus: Mordella
- Species: M. undulata

Binomial name
- Mordella undulata Melsheimer, 1845

Species of beetle

Mordellaria undulata is a species of beetle in the genus Mordella of the family Mordellidae, which is part of the superfamily Tenebrionoidea. It was discovered in 1845.

== Material examined ==
A collection localities has been examined in New Brunswick, Canada of Mordellaria undulata. New Brunswick, Queens Co., Cranberry Lake P.N.A. (Protected Natural Area), 46.1125°N, 65.6075°W, 4–18.VIII.2011, M. Roy & V. Webster, Lindgren funnel traps in forest canopy (2, RWC).

== Collection Methods ==
Many Mordellidae specimens were acquired by scouring grass or flowers. Others were obtained from Lindgren 12-funnel trap samples as part of a study to establish a broad attractant for detecting invading Cerambycidae species. These traps superficially resemble tree trunks and are frequently useful for sampling Coleoptera species that live in microhabitats associated with standing trees.

== Distribution ==
For each species in New Brunswick, distribution maps were made with ArcMap and ArcGIS are given. Every species is cited with its current distribution in Canada and Alaska, using state, province, and territory acronyms. Under Distribution in Canada and Alaska, new records for New Brunswick are highlighted in bold.

(Visit the reference to see the abbreviations with the current distribution in Canada and Alaska and acronyms of collection.)
