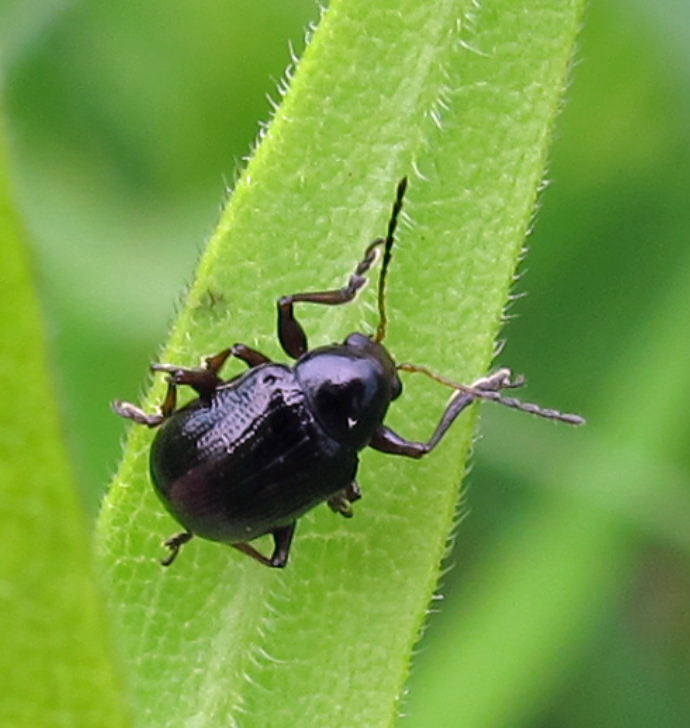

Scientific classification
- Kingdom: Animalia
- Phylum: Arthropoda
- Clade: Pancrustacea
- Class: Insecta
- Order: Coleoptera
- Suborder: Polyphaga
- Infraorder: Cucujiformia
- Family: Chrysomelidae
- Genus: Paria
- Species: P. thoracica

Binomial name
- Paria thoracica (F. E. Melsheimer, 1847)

Synonyms
- Metachroma thoracica F. E. Melsheimer, 1847

= Paria thoracica =

Species of beetle

Paria thoracica is a species of leaf beetle. It is found in North America.
