= Mordellistena fuscata =

Scientific classification
- Domain: Eukaryota
- Kingdom: Animalia
- Phylum: Arthropoda
- Class: Insecta
- Order: Coleoptera
- Suborder: Polyphaga
- Infraorder: Cucujiformia
- Family: Mordellidae
- Genus: Mordellistena
- Species: M. fuscata

Binomial name
- Mordellistena fuscata (Melsheimer, 1846)

Synonyms
- Mordella fuscata Melsheimer, 1846

Species of beetle

Mordellistena fuscata is a species of beetle in the family Mordellidae. It is in the genus Mordellistena. It was described in 1846 by Frederick Valentine Melsheimer.
