= Paria quadrinotata =

Scientific classification
- Kingdom: Animalia
- Phylum: Arthropoda
- Clade: Pancrustacea
- Class: Insecta
- Order: Coleoptera
- Suborder: Polyphaga
- Infraorder: Cucujiformia
- Family: Chrysomelidae
- Genus: Paria
- Species: P. quadrinotata

Binomial name
- Paria quadrinotata (Say, 1824)

Synonyms
- Colaspis infuscata Le Conte, 1824; Colaspis quadrinotata Say, 1824; Metachroma melanura F. E. Melsheimer, 1847; Paria gilvipes Crotch, 1873

Species of beetle

Paria quadrinotata is a species of leaf beetle. It is found in North America.
