= Pachyonychus =

Scientific classification
- Kingdom: Animalia
- Phylum: Arthropoda
- Class: Insecta
- Order: Coleoptera
- Suborder: Polyphaga
- Infraorder: Cucujiformia
- Family: Chrysomelidae
- Subfamily: Galerucinae
- Tribe: Alticini
- Genus: Pachyonychus; F. E. Melsheimer, 1847
- Species: P. paradoxus

Binomial name
- Pachyonychus paradoxus F. E. Melsheimer, 1847

Synonyms
- Clarkaltica Weise, 1921

Genus of beetles

Pachyonychus is a genus of flea beetles in the family Chrysomelidae containing a single described species, P. paradoxus, from the United States.

The name is extremely similar to a different flea beetle, Pachyonychis paradoxa, named in 1860, that occurs on the same host plant.
