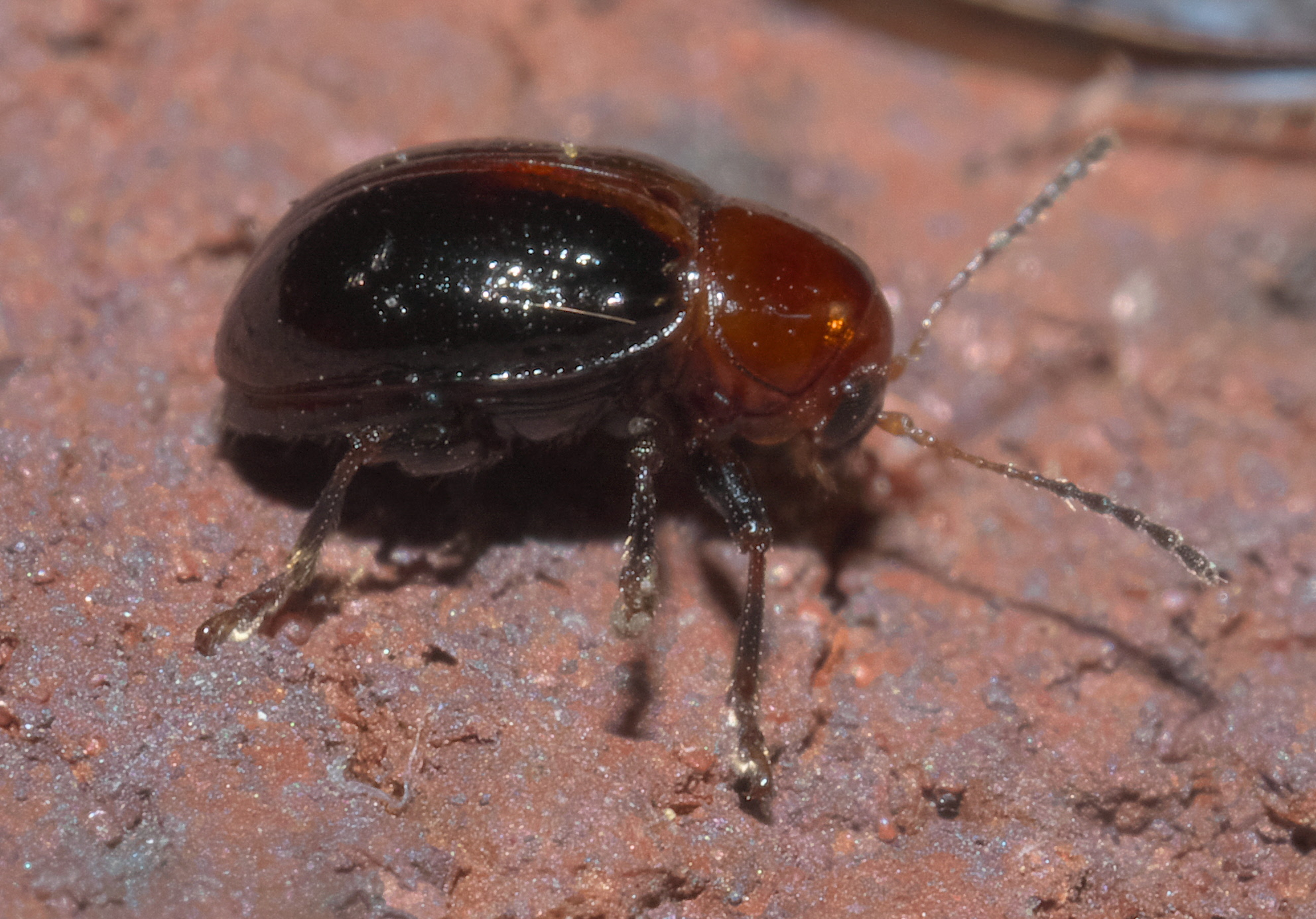

Scientific classification
- Kingdom: Animalia
- Phylum: Arthropoda
- Clade: Pancrustacea
- Class: Insecta
- Order: Coleoptera
- Suborder: Polyphaga
- Infraorder: Cucujiformia
- Family: Chrysomelidae
- Subfamily: Eumolpinae
- Tribe: Typophorini
- Genus: Paria; LeConte, 1858

Type species
- Paria quadriguttata LeConte, 1858

= Paria (beetle) =

Genus of leaf beetles from North and South America

Paria is a genus of leaf beetles in the subfamily Eumolpinae. There are about 40 described species in Paria in North and South America, 19 of which are known north of Mexico. The genus is very similar to Typophorus.

== Species ==
- Paria aeneipennis (Baly, 1878)
- Paria aemula Weise, 1921
- Paria aphthonina Bechyné & Bechyné, 1961
- Paria arizonensis Wilcox, 1957
- Paria aterrima (Olivier, 1808)
- Paria atripennis (Lefèvre, 1878)
- Paria badia Bechyné & Bechyné, 1961
- Paria barnesi Wilcox, 1957
- Paria binotata Jacoby, 1891
- Paria blatchleyi Wilcox, 1957
- Paria brunnea Jacoby, 1882
- Paria canella (Fabricius, 1801)
- Paria corumbana (Bechyné, 1951)
- Paria degenerata Weise, 1921
- Paria desculpta Bechyné & Bechyné, 1961
- Paria epimeralis (Bechyné, 1955)
- Paria erythopa (Lefèvre, 1888)
- Paria festinata (Bechyné, 1950)
- Paria fragariae Wilcox, 1954 (strawberry rootworm) (may be a species complex?)
  - Paria fragariae fragariae Wilcox, 1954
  - Paria fragariae kirki Balsbaugh, 1970
- Paria frosti Wilcox, 1957
- Paria fulvipennis (Lefèvre, 1884)
- Paria geniculata (Lefèvre, 1878)
- Paria horvathi (Bechyné, 1955)
- Paria laevipennis Jacoby, 1882
- Paria lepidoptera Bechyné, 1951
- Paria mesostigma Bechyné, 1954
- Paria montanella (Bechyné, 1951)
- Paria nigripennis (Lefèvre, 1884)
- Paria nigronotata (Lefèvre, 1877)
- Paria obliquata Bechyné, 1951
  - Paria obliquata capitata Bechyné, 1957
  - Paria obliquata obliquata Bechyné, 1951
- Paria opacicollis LeConte, 1859 (oak paria)
  - Paria opacicollis opacicollis LeConte, 1859
  - Paria opacicollis wenzeli Wilcox, 1957
- Paria picta Jacoby, 1891
- Paria pratensis Balsbaugh, 1970
- Paria pusilla (Lefèvre, 1876)
- Paria quadriguttata LeConte, 1858 (willow paria)
- Paria quadrinotata (Say, 1824)
- Paria quadriplagiata (Jacoby, 1876)
- Paria scutellaris (Notman, 1920)
- Paria sellata (Horn, 1892)
- Paria sexnotata (Say, 1824) (juniper paria)
- Paria thoracica (F. E. Melsheimer, 1847)
- Paria tibialis Jacoby, 1882
- Paria tincta (Bechyné, 1957)
- Paria virginiae Wilcox, 1957
- Paria vittaticollis Baly, 1878
- Paria wilcoxi Balsbaugh, 1970

Species moved to Typophorus:

- Paria jacobyi (Lefèvre, 1884)
  - Paria jacobyi atramentaria Weise, 1921
  - Paria jacobyi jacobyi (Lefèvre, 1884)
- Paria maculigera Lefèvre, 1888
- Paria nigra Weise, 1921
- Paria nigritarsis Jacoby, 1882
- Paria signata (Lefèvre, 1891)

Species moved to other genera:

- Paria gounellei Lefèvre, 1888: moved to Phytoparia
- Paria stigmula Lefèvre, 1888: moved to Tijucana
- Paria vitticollis Jacoby, 1882: moved to Tijucana
