= Heteraspis wittei =

Scientific classification
- Kingdom: Animalia
- Phylum: Arthropoda
- Clade: Pancrustacea
- Class: Insecta
- Order: Coleoptera
- Suborder: Polyphaga
- Infraorder: Cucujiformia
- Family: Chrysomelidae
- Genus: Heteraspis
- Species: H. wittei

Binomial name
- Heteraspis wittei (Burgeon, 1942)

Synonyms
- Scelodonta wittei Burgeon, 1942

Species of beetle

Heteraspis wittei is a species of leaf beetle found in sub-Saharan Africa. It was first described by the Belgian entomologist Louis Burgeon in 1942, from specimens collected by Gaston-François de Witte from the Albert National Park between 1933 and 1935.

== Distribution ==
H. wittei is recorded from the Republic of the Congo, the Democratic Republic of the Congo, South Sudan, Ethiopia, Somalia, Eritrea and Ivory Coast.
