= Paria pratensis =

Scientific classification
- Kingdom: Animalia
- Phylum: Arthropoda
- Clade: Pancrustacea
- Class: Insecta
- Order: Coleoptera
- Suborder: Polyphaga
- Infraorder: Cucujiformia
- Family: Chrysomelidae
- Genus: Paria
- Species: P. pratensis

Binomial name
- Paria pratensis Balsbaugh, 1970

Species of beetle

Paria pratensis is a species of leaf beetle. It is found in the eastern United States and eastern Canada (Ontario, Quebec and New Brunswick). One known host plant is the prairie rose (Rosa setigera).
