= Xanthonia vagans =

Scientific classification
- Kingdom: Animalia
- Phylum: Arthropoda
- Clade: Pancrustacea
- Class: Insecta
- Order: Coleoptera
- Suborder: Polyphaga
- Infraorder: Cucujiformia
- Family: Chrysomelidae
- Genus: Xanthonia
- Species: X. vagans

Binomial name
- Xanthonia vagans (LeConte, 1884)

Synonyms
- Trichotheca vagans LeConte, 1884

Species of beetle

Xanthonia vagans is a species of leaf beetle. Its range spans from Central Texas and Arizona (USA) to Sonora, Mexico. It is associated with junipers.

A relatively large Xanthonia, X. pilosa measures 3.8–5.2 mm (0.15–0.20 in) in length. The dorsal ground color is medium to dark brownish. The elytra have vague dark streaks.
