= Graphops comosa =

Scientific classification
- Kingdom: Animalia
- Phylum: Arthropoda
- Clade: Pancrustacea
- Class: Insecta
- Order: Coleoptera
- Suborder: Polyphaga
- Infraorder: Cucujiformia
- Family: Chrysomelidae
- Genus: Graphops
- Species: G. comosa

Binomial name
- Graphops comosa Blake, 1955

Species of beetle

Graphops comosa, known generally as the Monahans sandhill chrysomelid or long-haired graphops, is a species of leaf beetle. It is found in southeast New Mexico and the adjacent region of Texas.

Adult beetles of G. comosa have the heaviest pubescence of any in the genus. Their coarse white hairs entirely conceal the punctuation on the elytra, giving the beetles a grayish appearance similar to that of Glyptoscelis species. The specific name, comosa, is Latin for "with long hair".
