= Neofidia humeralis =

Scientific classification
- Kingdom: Animalia
- Phylum: Arthropoda
- Clade: Pancrustacea
- Class: Insecta
- Order: Coleoptera
- Suborder: Polyphaga
- Infraorder: Cucujiformia
- Family: Chrysomelidae
- Genus: Neofidia
- Species: N. humeralis

Binomial name
- Neofidia humeralis (Lefèvre, 1877)

Synonyms
- Fidia humeralis Lefèvre, 1877; Fidia plagiata Lefèvre, 1877

Species of beetle

Neofidia humeralis is a species of leaf beetle. It ranges from southeastern Arizona and southwestern New Mexico, along the Sierra Madre Occidental and Sierra Madre del Sur, south to Oaxaca in southwestern Mexico. It was first described as two species, Fidia humeralis and Fidia plagiata, by the French entomologist Édouard Lefèvre in 1877. These two species were later found to be synonymous.
