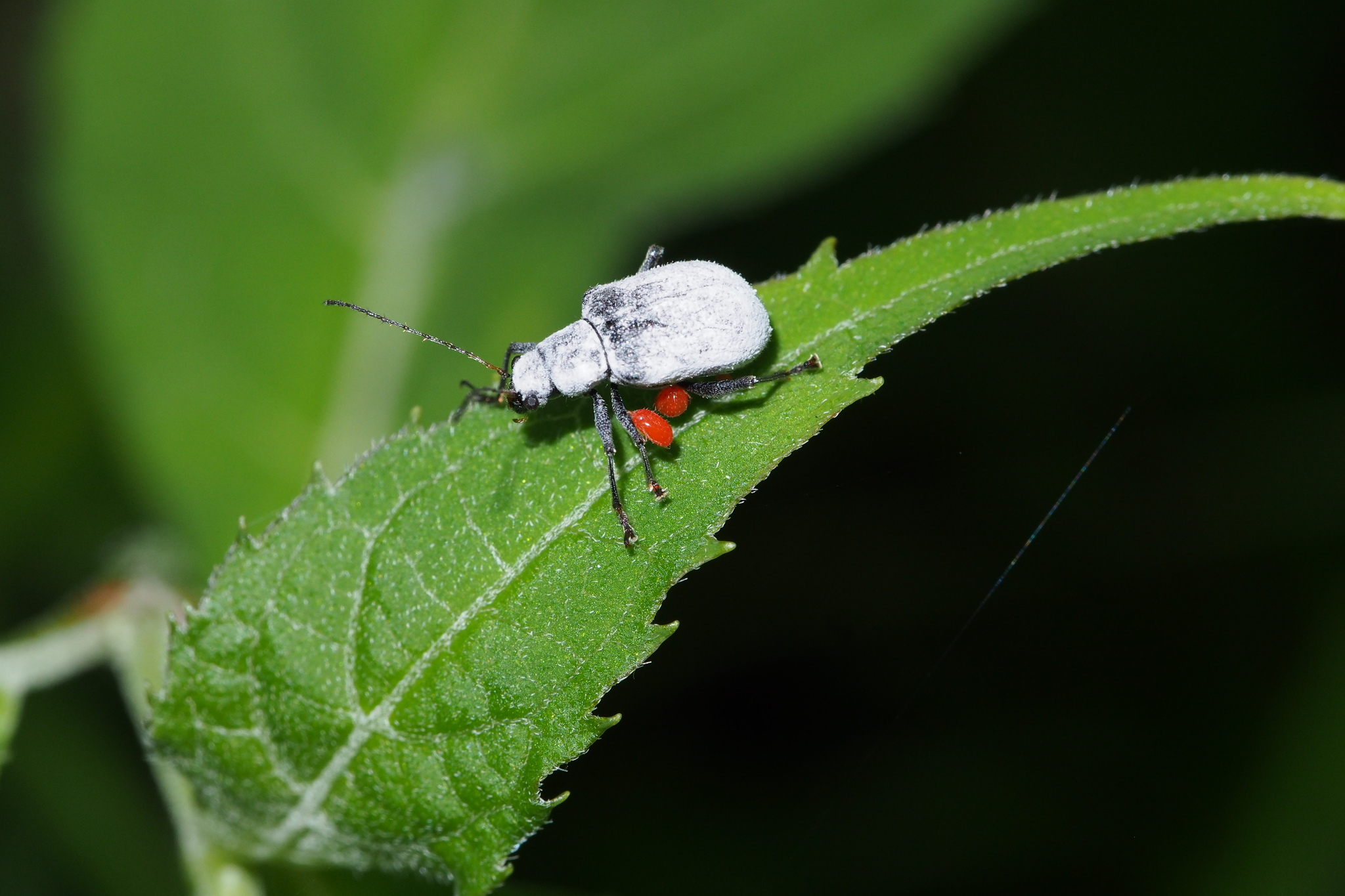
- Fidia atra, Japan

Scientific classification
- Kingdom: Animalia
- Phylum: Arthropoda
- Clade: Pancrustacea
- Class: Insecta
- Order: Coleoptera
- Suborder: Polyphaga
- Infraorder: Cucujiformia
- Family: Chrysomelidae
- Subfamily: Eumolpinae
- Tribe: Bromiini
- Genus: Fidia
- Species: F. atra

Binomial name
- Fidia atra Motschulsky, 1861

Synonyms
- Leprotes pulverulentus Jacoby, 1885; Leprotes testaceipes Pic, 1928; Lypesthes ater ater f. tibialis Ohno, 1958; Lypesthes ater fulvipes Chûjô, 1954; Talmonus farinosus Fairmaire, 1889

= Fidia atra =

Species of leaf beetle

Fidia atra is a species of leaf beetle in the family Chrysomelidae. It is distributed in Japan, China, Korea, and the Russian Far East.

The adult beetle is generally coloured black. In nature, the body is covered with a white powdery excrescence; when rubbed, it has a shining black colour. The distal ends of the tibiae, the tarsi, the basal three segments of the antennae, and the labrum are fulvous in colour.

The species was first described by Victor Motschulsky in 1861 from specimens that had been rubbed, therefore lacking the white powder covering the beetle's black body, giving it the name "atra" (from ater, the Latin word for black). It was described again by Martin Jacoby in 1885, this time with the white powder, under the name Leprotes pulverulentus. Later that same year, Jacoby realised that his species was identical to Motschulsky's and synonymised his own species with it. The species was later described a third time by Léon Fairmaire in 1889 under the name Talmonus farinosus, which was synonymised by Jacoby the following year.
