= Graphops beryllina =

Scientific classification
- Kingdom: Animalia
- Phylum: Arthropoda
- Clade: Pancrustacea
- Class: Insecta
- Order: Coleoptera
- Suborder: Polyphaga
- Infraorder: Cucujiformia
- Family: Chrysomelidae
- Genus: Graphops
- Species: G. beryllina

Binomial name
- Graphops beryllina LeConte, 1884

Species of beetle

Graphops beryllina is a species of leaf beetle. It is found in North America.
