= Paria scutellaris =

Scientific classification
- Kingdom: Animalia
- Phylum: Arthropoda
- Clade: Pancrustacea
- Class: Insecta
- Order: Coleoptera
- Suborder: Polyphaga
- Infraorder: Cucujiformia
- Family: Chrysomelidae
- Genus: Paria
- Species: P. scutellaris

Binomial name
- Paria scutellaris (Notman, 1920)

Synonyms
- Typophorus canellus scutellaris Notman, 1920

Species of beetle

Paria scutellaris is a species of leaf beetle. It is found in North America.
