= Pachyonychis =

Scientific classification
- Kingdom: Animalia
- Phylum: Arthropoda
- Class: Insecta
- Order: Coleoptera
- Suborder: Polyphaga
- Infraorder: Cucujiformia
- Family: Chrysomelidae
- Subfamily: Galerucinae
- Tribe: Alticini
- Genus: Pachyonychis; H. Clark, 1860
- Species: P. paradoxa

Binomial name
- Pachyonychis paradoxa H. Clark, 1860

Synonyms
- Pachyonychus Crotch, 1873 (Missp.); Hamletia Crotch, 1873; Hamletia dimidiaticornis Crotch, 1873

Genus of beetles

Pachyonychis is a genus of flea beetles in the family Chrysomelidae containing a single described species, P. paradoxa, from the United States.

The name is extremely similar to a different flea beetle, Pachyonychus paradoxus, named in 1847, that occurs on the same host plant; Crotch, in 1873, erroneously thought that Clark's name was spelled the same as the other species, and replaced Clark's name.
