= Neofidia clematis =

Scientific classification
- Kingdom: Animalia
- Phylum: Arthropoda
- Clade: Pancrustacea
- Class: Insecta
- Order: Coleoptera
- Suborder: Polyphaga
- Infraorder: Cucujiformia
- Family: Chrysomelidae
- Genus: Neofidia
- Species: N. clematis

Binomial name
- Neofidia clematis (Schaeffer, 1904)

Synonyms
- Fidia clematis Schaeffer, 1904

Species of beetle

Neofidia clematis is a species of leaf beetle. It is known from southernmost Texas, United States, to central Veracruz, Mexico, east of the Sierra Madre Oriental. It was first described by the American entomologist Charles Frederic August Schaeffer in 1904. Two series of this species from Texas were collected from Cissus incisa, a species in the grape family (Vitaceae).
