= Paria quadriguttata =

Scientific classification
- Kingdom: Animalia
- Phylum: Arthropoda
- Clade: Pancrustacea
- Class: Insecta
- Order: Coleoptera
- Suborder: Polyphaga
- Infraorder: Cucujiformia
- Family: Chrysomelidae
- Genus: Paria
- Species: P. quadriguttata

Binomial name
- Paria quadriguttata LeConte, 1858

Synonyms
- Paria saliceti Wilcox, 1954

Species of beetle

Paria quadriguttata, the willow parium, is a species of leaf beetle. It is found in Central America and North America.
