= Xanthonia decemnotata =

Conservation status
- Secure (NatureServe)

Scientific classification
- Kingdom: Animalia
- Phylum: Arthropoda
- Clade: Pancrustacea
- Class: Insecta
- Order: Coleoptera
- Suborder: Polyphaga
- Infraorder: Cucujiformia
- Family: Chrysomelidae
- Genus: Xanthonia
- Species: X. decemnotata

Binomial name
- Xanthonia decemnotata (Say, 1824)

Synonyms
- Colaspis decemnotata Say, 1824; Eumolpus? hobsoni Curtis, 1840

Species of beetle

Xanthonia decemnotata, the ten-spotted leaf beetle, is a species of leaf beetle. It is found in eastern North America, from Saskatchewan to Nova Scotia in Canada and to New England in the United States, becoming rare further south.

Xanthonia decemnotata measures 3–3.5 mm (0.12–0.14 in) in length. The elytra are reddish brown with black spots.
