= Heteraspis bidentata =

Scientific classification
- Kingdom: Animalia
- Phylum: Arthropoda
- Clade: Pancrustacea
- Class: Insecta
- Order: Coleoptera
- Suborder: Polyphaga
- Infraorder: Cucujiformia
- Family: Chrysomelidae
- Genus: Heteraspis
- Species: H. bidentata

Binomial name
- Heteraspis bidentata (Baly, 1877)

Synonyms
- Scelodonta bidentata Baly, 1877; Scelodonta egregia Lefèvre, 1877

Species of beetle

Heteraspis bidentata is a species of leaf beetle found in West and Central Africa. It was first described from Old Calabar by Joseph Sugar Baly in 1877.

== Distribution ==
H. bidentata is recorded from Nigeria, Cameroon, the Republic of the Congo, the Democratic Republic of the Congo and Ivory Coast.
