= Heteraspis viridula =

Scientific classification
- Kingdom: Animalia
- Phylum: Arthropoda
- Clade: Pancrustacea
- Class: Insecta
- Order: Coleoptera
- Suborder: Polyphaga
- Infraorder: Cucujiformia
- Family: Chrysomelidae
- Genus: Heteraspis
- Species: H. viridula

Binomial name
- Heteraspis viridula (Lefèvre, 1875)

Synonyms
- Scelodonta viridula Lefèvre, 1875

Species of beetle

Heteraspis viridula is a species of leaf beetle of West Africa, the Republic of the Congo and the Democratic Republic of the Congo. It was first described from Old Calabar, now in Nigeria, by Édouard Lefèvre in 1875.
