= Heteraspis vicina =

Scientific classification
- Kingdom: Animalia
- Phylum: Arthropoda
- Clade: Pancrustacea
- Class: Insecta
- Order: Coleoptera
- Suborder: Polyphaga
- Infraorder: Cucujiformia
- Family: Chrysomelidae
- Genus: Heteraspis
- Species: H. vicina

Binomial name
- Heteraspis vicina (Harold, 1877)

Synonyms
- Scelodonta vicina Harold, 1877; Scelodonta jacobyi Baly, 1878

Species of beetle

Heteraspis vicina is a species of leaf beetle found in Central and East Africa and the southern Arabian Peninsula. It was first described from the region of Lake Nyassa by the German entomologist Edgar von Harold in 1877.

== Distribution ==
H. vicina is recorded from the Democratic Republic of the Congo, Ethiopia, Mozambique, Tanzania, Saudi Arabia, Oman and Yemen.
