= Paria sexnotata =

Scientific classification
- Kingdom: Animalia
- Phylum: Arthropoda
- Clade: Pancrustacea
- Class: Insecta
- Order: Coleoptera
- Suborder: Polyphaga
- Infraorder: Cucujiformia
- Family: Chrysomelidae
- Genus: Paria
- Species: P. sexnotata

Binomial name
- Paria sexnotata (Say, 1824)

Synonyms
- Colaspis sexnotata Say, 1824; Paria juniperi Blatchley, 1927

Species of beetle

Paria sexnotata, the juniper parium, is a species of leaf beetle. It is found in North America.
