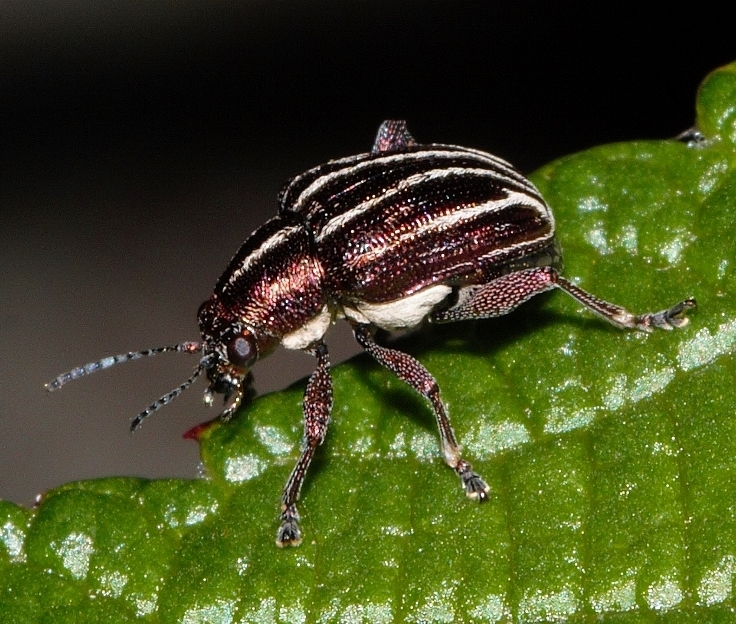
- Heteraspis albidovittata, Zimbabwe

Scientific classification
- Kingdom: Animalia
- Phylum: Arthropoda
- Clade: Pancrustacea
- Class: Insecta
- Order: Coleoptera
- Suborder: Polyphaga
- Infraorder: Cucujiformia
- Family: Chrysomelidae
- Genus: Heteraspis
- Species: H. albidovittata

Binomial name
- Heteraspis albidovittata (Baly, 1877)

Synonyms
- Scelodonta albidovittata Baly, 1877; Pseudocolaspis albolineata Ancey, 1882

= Heteraspis albidovittata =

Species of beetle

Heteraspis albidovittata is a species of leaf beetle found in sub-Saharan Africa. It was first described from Damaraland by Joseph Sugar Baly in 1877.

== Subspecies ==
There are two subspecies of H. albidovittata:

- Heteraspis albidovittata albidovittata (Baly, 1877): The nominotypical subspecies. Found in Namibia, Tanzania, South Sudan and the Democratic Republic of the Congo.
- Heteraspis albidovittata ruandensis (Burgeon, 1941): Found in Rwanda.
