= Paria virginiae =

Scientific classification
- Kingdom: Animalia
- Phylum: Arthropoda
- Clade: Pancrustacea
- Class: Insecta
- Order: Coleoptera
- Suborder: Polyphaga
- Infraorder: Cucujiformia
- Family: Chrysomelidae
- Genus: Paria
- Species: P. virginiae

Binomial name
- Paria virginiae Wilcox, 1957

Species of beetle

Paria virginiae is a species of leaf beetle. It is found in North America.
