= Heteraspis quadrifossulata =

Scientific classification
- Kingdom: Animalia
- Phylum: Arthropoda
- Clade: Pancrustacea
- Class: Insecta
- Order: Coleoptera
- Suborder: Polyphaga
- Infraorder: Cucujiformia
- Family: Chrysomelidae
- Genus: Heteraspis
- Species: H. quadrifossulata

Binomial name
- Heteraspis quadrifossulata (Burgeon, 1941)

Synonyms
- Scelodonta quadrifossulata Burgeon, 1941

Species of beetle

Heteraspis quadrifossulata is a species of leaf beetle found in sub-Saharan Africa. It was first described from Gatsibo in Rwanda by the Belgian entomologist Louis Burgeon in 1941.

== Distribution ==
H. quadrifossulata is recorded from Rwanda and the Democratic Republic of the Congo.
