= Graphops nebulosa =

Scientific classification
- Kingdom: Animalia
- Phylum: Arthropoda
- Clade: Pancrustacea
- Class: Insecta
- Order: Coleoptera
- Suborder: Polyphaga
- Infraorder: Cucujiformia
- Family: Chrysomelidae
- Genus: Graphops
- Species: G. nebulosa

Binomial name
- Graphops nebulosa (LeConte, 1859)

Synonyms
- Heteraspis nebulosa LeConte, 1859

Species of beetle

Graphops nebulosa is a species of leaf beetle. It is found in North America.
