= Heteraspis turneri =

Scientific classification
- Kingdom: Animalia
- Phylum: Arthropoda
- Clade: Pancrustacea
- Class: Insecta
- Order: Coleoptera
- Suborder: Polyphaga
- Infraorder: Cucujiformia
- Family: Chrysomelidae
- Genus: Heteraspis
- Species: H. turneri

Binomial name
- Heteraspis turneri (Bryant, 1952)

Synonyms
- Scelodonta turneri Bryant, 1952

Species of beetle

Heteraspis turneri is a species of leaf beetle from Kenya and the Democratic Republic of the Congo. It was first described by Gilbert Ernest Bryant in 1952.
