= Heteraspis congoana =

Scientific classification
- Kingdom: Animalia
- Phylum: Arthropoda
- Clade: Pancrustacea
- Class: Insecta
- Order: Coleoptera
- Suborder: Polyphaga
- Infraorder: Cucujiformia
- Family: Chrysomelidae
- Genus: Heteraspis
- Species: H. congoana

Binomial name
- Heteraspis congoana (Weise, 1915)

Synonyms
- Scelodonta congoana Weise, 1915

Species of beetle

Heteraspis congoana is a species of leaf beetle of the Democratic Republic of the Congo. It was first described by Julius Weise in 1915, from specimens collected from Ubangi District in 1910.
