= Heteraspis lineaticollis =

Scientific classification
- Kingdom: Animalia
- Phylum: Arthropoda
- Clade: Pancrustacea
- Class: Insecta
- Order: Coleoptera
- Suborder: Polyphaga
- Infraorder: Cucujiformia
- Family: Chrysomelidae
- Genus: Heteraspis
- Species: H. lineaticollis

Binomial name
- Heteraspis lineaticollis (Pic, 1950)

Synonyms
- Scelodonta lineaticollis Pic, 1950

Species of beetle

Heteraspis lineaticollis is a species of leaf beetle of West Africa. It was first described from Senegal by Maurice Pic in 1950, but according to the African Eumolpinae site, the type specimen bears the label "Gambia".
