= Graphops marcassita =

Scientific classification
- Kingdom: Animalia
- Phylum: Arthropoda
- Clade: Pancrustacea
- Class: Insecta
- Order: Coleoptera
- Suborder: Polyphaga
- Infraorder: Cucujiformia
- Family: Chrysomelidae
- Genus: Graphops
- Species: G. marcassita

Binomial name
- Graphops marcassita (Crotch, 1873)

Synonyms
- Heteraspis marcassita Crotch, 1873

Species of beetle

Graphops marcassita is a species of leaf beetle. It is found in North America.

== Subspecies ==
These two subspecies belong to the species Graphops marcassita:

- Graphops marcassita marcassita (Crotch, 1873)^{i c g}
- Graphops marcassita pugitana Blake, 1955^{i c g}

Data sources: i = ITIS, c = Catalogue of Life, g = GBIF, b = Bugguide.net
