= Heteraspis parcepilosa =

Scientific classification
- Kingdom: Animalia
- Phylum: Arthropoda
- Clade: Pancrustacea
- Class: Insecta
- Order: Coleoptera
- Suborder: Polyphaga
- Infraorder: Cucujiformia
- Family: Chrysomelidae
- Genus: Heteraspis
- Species: H. parcepilosa

Binomial name
- Heteraspis parcepilosa (Burgeon, 1941)

Synonyms
- Scelodonta parcepilosa Burgeon, 1941

Species of beetle

Heteraspis parcepilosa is a species of leaf beetle. It is distributed in the Democratic Republic of the Congo and South Sudan. It was first described by the Belgian entomologist Louis Burgeon in 1941.
