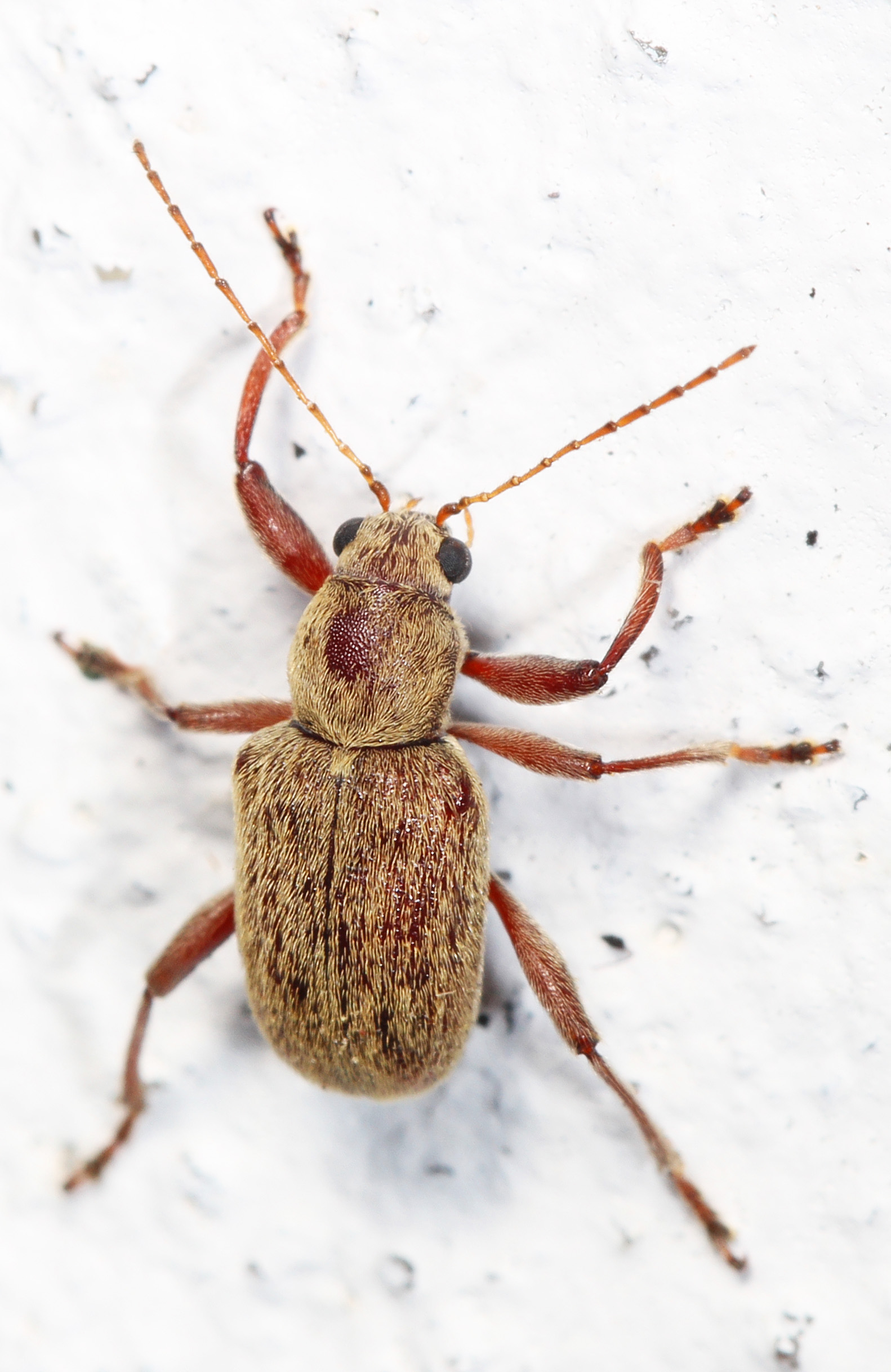

Scientific classification
- Kingdom: Animalia
- Phylum: Arthropoda
- Clade: Pancrustacea
- Class: Insecta
- Order: Coleoptera
- Suborder: Polyphaga
- Infraorder: Cucujiformia
- Family: Chrysomelidae
- Genus: Neofidia
- Species: N. lurida

Binomial name
- Neofidia lurida (Baly, 1863)

Synonyms
- Fidia lurida Baly, 1863; Fidia viticida Walsh, 1867

= Neofidia lurida =

Species of beetle

Neofidia lurida, the grape rootworm, is a species of leaf beetle. Grape rootworms are found in eastern North America, south to Mexico, and have been recently reported as far north as Quebec. Adults are typically 4.9 to 7.0 mm in length. They are colored mahogany brown, and are covered with white to straw-yellow hairs.

The grape rootworm larvae feed on the roots of grape vines, Virginia creeper, and other members of the plant family Vitaceae. They can be a significant economic pest to grape producers. Grape rootworms generally produce one generation per year. Adults emerge in late spring and early summer, feeding on leaves for 3–4 weeks, and producing eggs which hatch in 1–2 weeks. The larvae overwinter in the ground, and resume feeding on plant roots in the spring.
