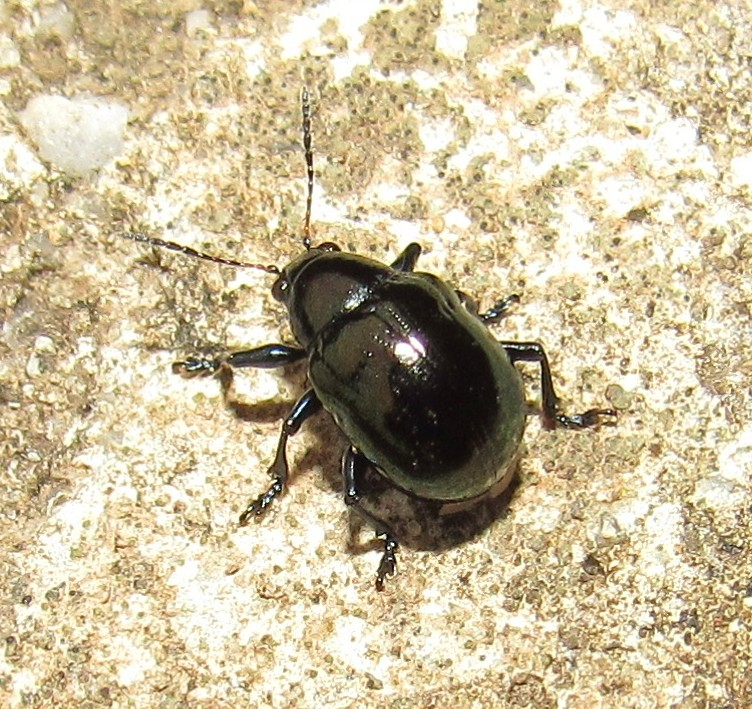
- T. nigritus, Santa Catarina, Brazil
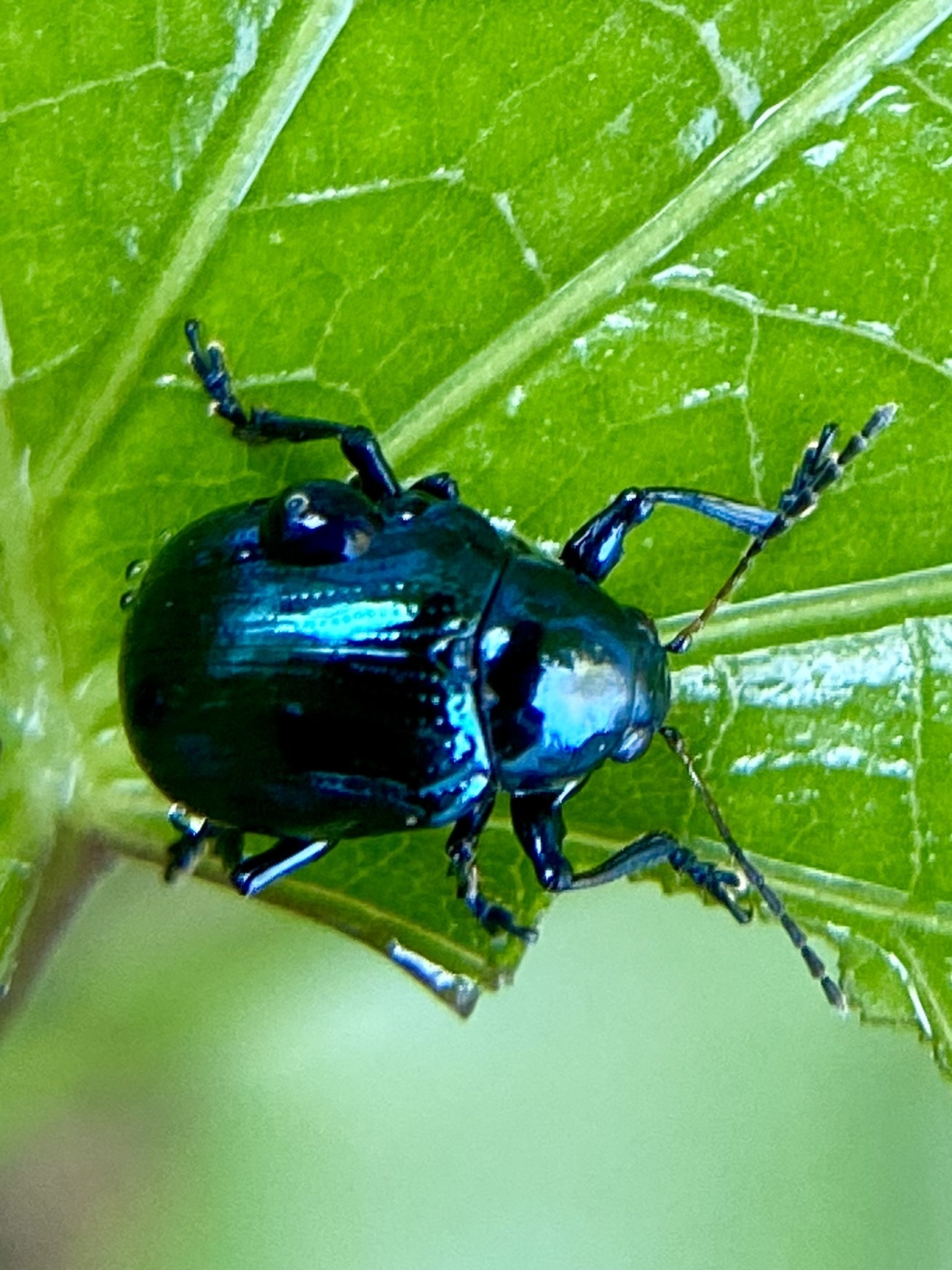
- T. nigritus, Texas, US

Scientific classification
- Kingdom: Animalia
- Phylum: Arthropoda
- Clade: Pancrustacea
- Class: Insecta
- Order: Coleoptera
- Suborder: Polyphaga
- Infraorder: Cucujiformia
- Family: Chrysomelidae
- Genus: Typophorus
- Species: T. nigritus

Binomial name
- Typophorus nigritus (Fabricius, 1801)

Synonyms
- Eumolpus nigritus Fabricius, 1801

= Typophorus nigritus =

Species of beetle

Typophorus nigritus is a species of leaf beetle in the subfamily Eumolpinae. It is found in North, Central, and South America.

Two subspecies, T. nigritus nitidulus and T. nigritus viridicyaneus, are known as pests of sweet potatoes.

== Subspecies ==
There are 13 subspecies of T. nigritus:

- Typophorus nigritus chalceus Lefèvre, 1877 – Mexico (Veracruz)
- Typophorus nigritus coronadoi Bechyné, 1948 – Mexico (Durango)
- Typophorus nigritus cretifer Bechyné, 1953 – Guatemala
- Typophorus nigritus erbeni Bechyné, 1948 – Trinidad
- Typophorus nigritus interpositus Bechyné, 1951 – Costa Rica
- Typophorus nigritus lucens Bechyné, 1953 – Brazil (Pernambuco, Rio Grande do Norte)
- Typophorus nigritus molnari Bechyné, 1953 – Brazil (Pará)
- Typophorus nigritus nigritus (Fabricius, 1801) – Guyana, Venezuela, Colombia, Brazil (Rondônia, Acré, Amazonas)
- Typophorus nigritus nitidulus (Fabricius, 1801) – Brazil, Argentina, Paraguay, Uruguay, Bolivia, Peru
- Typophorus nigritus obliquus Baly, 1859 – Guatemala, Panama, Colombia, Venezuela
- Typophorus nigritus paradoxus Jacoby, 1882 – Honduras, Guatemala
- Typophorus nigritus punctatissimus Bechyné, 1948 – Mexico (Guerrero)
- Typophorus nigritus viridicyaneus (Crotch, 1873) (sweetpotato leaf beetle) – USA, Mexico (Baja California)
