= Paria opacicollis =

Scientific classification
- Kingdom: Animalia
- Phylum: Arthropoda
- Clade: Pancrustacea
- Class: Insecta
- Order: Coleoptera
- Suborder: Polyphaga
- Infraorder: Cucujiformia
- Family: Chrysomelidae
- Genus: Paria
- Species: P. opacicollis

Binomial name
- Paria opacicollis LeConte, 1859

Synonyms
- Paria laevicollis Crotch, 1873; Typophorus histrio Lefèvre, 1877

Species of beetle

Paria opacicollis, the oak parium, is a species of leaf beetle. It is found in North America.

== Subspecies ==
These two subspecies belong to the species Paria opacicollis:

- Paria opacicollis opacicollis LeConte, 1859
- Paria opacicollis wenzeli Wilcox, 1957
