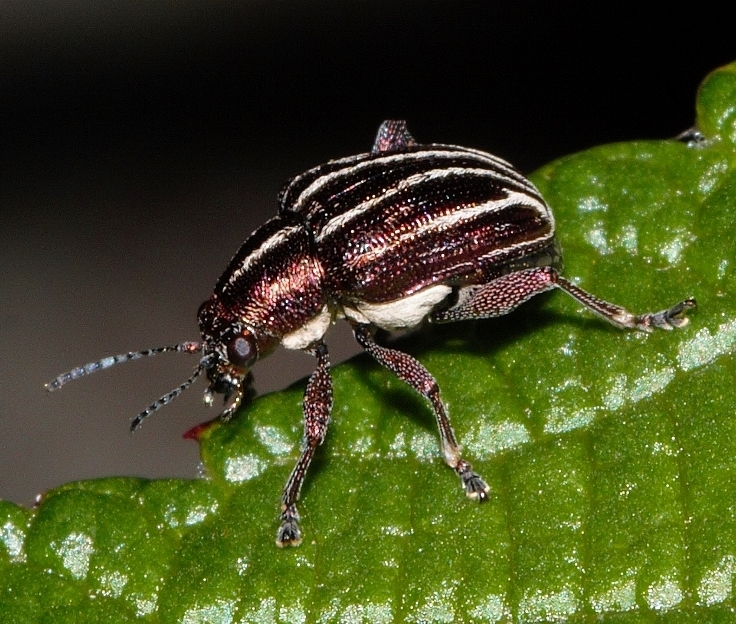
- Heteraspis albidovittata, Zimbabwe

Scientific classification
- Kingdom: Animalia
- Phylum: Arthropoda
- Clade: Pancrustacea
- Class: Insecta
- Order: Coleoptera
- Suborder: Polyphaga
- Infraorder: Cucujiformia
- Family: Chrysomelidae
- Subfamily: Eumolpinae
- Tribe: Bromiini
- Genus: Heteraspis; Chevrolat in Dejean, 1836

Type species
- Eumolpus vittatus Olivier, 1808

Synonyms
- Scelodonta Westwood, 1838; Scelodontomorpha Pic, 1938

= Heteraspis =

Genus of beetles

Heteraspis (formerly Scelodonta) is a genus of leaf beetles in the subfamily Eumolpinae. The genus includes over 70 species, mainly from the Afrotropical and Oriental biogeographic realms. Only three species are found in Australia.

According to recent literature, the name Scelodonta Westwood, 1838 is actually a junior synonym of Heteraspis Chevrolat in Dejean, 1836. As the conditions for reversal of precedence in the International Code of Zoological Nomenclature are not met, Heteraspis should be used as the valid name for the genus.

== Species ==
Select species include:

- Heteraspis aeneola (Lefèvre, 1885) – Philippines
- Heteraspis albidovittata (Baly, 1877)
  - Heteraspis albidovittata albidovittata (Baly, 1877)
  - Heteraspis albidovittata ruandensis (Burgeon, 1941)
- Heteraspis albomaculata (Pic, 1939)
- Heteraspis albopectoralis (Pic, 1943)
- Heteraspis alternata (Jacoby, 1908) – Andaman Islands
- Heteraspis areolata (Lefèvre, 1891) – India
- Heteraspis aurosignata (Lefèvre, 1883)
- Heteraspis bella (Pic, 1937)
- Heteraspis bidentata (Baly, 1877)
- Heteraspis brevipilis (Lea, 1915) – Australia
- Heteraspis carinata (Bryant, 1956)
- Heteraspis celebensis (Jacoby, 1894) – Sulawesi
- Heteraspis chapuisi (Lefèvre, 1884)
- Heteraspis congoana (Weise, 1915)
- Heteraspis corrugata (Lefèvre, 1885)
- Heteraspis costata (Jacoby, 1894)
- Heteraspis costatipennis (Pic, 1956)
- Heteraspis cuprea (Bryant, 1935)
- Heteraspis curculionoides (Westwood, 1838) – Philippines, Sulawesi
- Heteraspis cyanea (Lefèvre, 1877)
- Heteraspis dillwyni (Stephens, 1831) – Afghanistan, India, Myanmar, Nepal, Thailand, Cambodia, Laos, Vietnam, South China, Hainan, Philippines, Malaysia, Singapore, Borneo, Sumatra
- Heteraspis dispar (Lefèvre, 1885) – Philippines
- Heteraspis diversecostata (Pic, 1941) – Borneo
- Heteraspis gowdeyi (Bryant, 1935)
- Heteraspis granulosa (Baly, 1867) – India, Thailand, Laos, Vietnam, South China, Borneo, Sulawesi
- Heteraspis humeralis (Pic, 1956)
- Heteraspis immaculata (Jacoby, 1908) – Southern India
- Heteraspis impressipennis (Lefèvre, 1877)
- Heteraspis inaequalis (Fairmaire, 1887)
- Heteraspis iriana (Medvedev, 2009) – Biak
- Heteraspis insignata (Pic, 1955)
- Heteraspis kibonotensis (Weise, 1910)
- Heteraspis laeviuscula (Heller, 1898) – Sulawesi
- Heteraspis lefevrei (Jacoby, 1904)
- Heteraspis lewisii (Baly, 1874) – Vietnam, China, Japan, Taiwan, North Korea, South Korea
- Heteraspis lineaticollis (Pic, 1950)
- Heteraspis longicollis (Jacoby, 1908) – Kashmir
- Heteraspis maculicollis (Burgeon, 1941)
- Heteraspis maculosa (Lefèvre, 1891)
- Heteraspis madoni (Pic, 1949)
- Heteraspis monardi (Pic, 1939)
- Heteraspis murrayi (Baly, 1865)
- Heteraspis natalensis (Baly, 1878)
- Heteraspis nilgiriensis (Jacoby, 1908) – Southern India
- Heteraspis palmerstoni (Blackburn, 1889) – Australia
- Heteraspis parcepilosa (Burgeon, 1941)
- Heteraspis pectoralis (Jacoby, 1898)
- Heteraspis pulchella (Baly, 1864) – Sulawesi
- Heteraspis pulchra (Schaufuss, 1885) – Sumatra
- Heteraspis purpurea (Papp, 1951)
- Heteraspis purpureomaculata (Baly, 1864) – Sulawesi
- Heteraspis quadrifossulata (Burgeon, 1941)
- Heteraspis raffrayi (Lefèvre, 1877)
- Heteraspis rugipennis (Jacoby, 1904)
- Heteraspis sansibarica (Gerstaecker, 1871)
- Heteraspis sauteri (Chûjô, 1938) – Taiwan
- Heteraspis sexplagiata (Jacoby, 1900)
- Heteraspis simoni (Baly, 1878) – Australia
- Heteraspis spinipes (Pic, 1937)
- Heteraspis strigata (Lefèvre, 1877)
- Heteraspis subcostata (Jacoby, 1908) – Andaman Islands
- Heteraspis subglabra (Gridelli, 1939)
- Heteraspis superba (Pic, 1937)
- Heteraspis theresae (Pic, 1956)
- Heteraspis trinotata (Pic, 1939)
- Heteraspis turneri (Bryant, 1952)
- Heteraspis vicina (Harold, 1877)
- Heteraspis vietnamica (Eroshkina, 1988)
- Heteraspis viridimaculata (Jacoby, 1877)
- Heteraspis viridula (Lefèvre, 1875)
- Heteraspis vitis (Bryant, 1931)
- Heteraspis vitivora (Bryant, 1935)
- Heteraspis vitticollis (Weise, 1906)
- Heteraspis vittata (Olivier, 1808) – Nepal, Vietnam, Thailand, Cambodia, Laos, India, Myanmar, Andaman Islands
- Heteraspis wittei (Burgeon, 1942)

Synonyms:

- Scelodonta aenea (Motschulsky, 1866): synonym of Pagria restituens (Walker, 1859)
- Scelodonta egregia Lefèvre, 1877: synonym of Heteraspis bidentata (Baly, 1877)
- Scelodonta indica Duvivier, 1891: synonym of Heteraspis dillwyni (Stephens, 1831)
- Scelodonta orientalis Lefèvre, 1877: synonym of Heteraspis lewisii (Baly, 1874)
- Scelodonta strigicollis (Motschulsky, 1866): synonym of Heteraspis dillwyni (Stephens, 1831)
