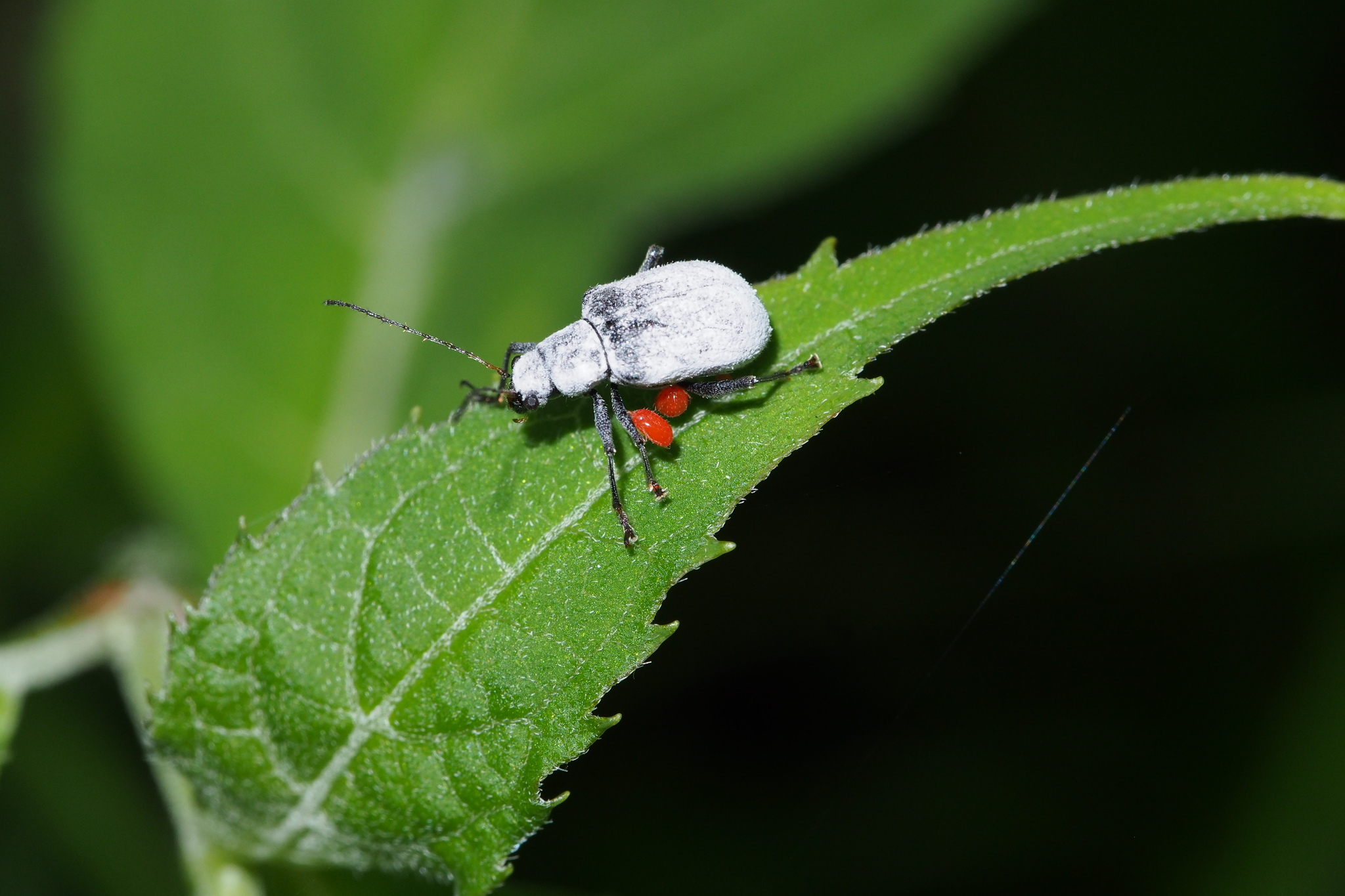
- Fidia atra, Japan

Scientific classification
- Kingdom: Animalia
- Phylum: Arthropoda
- Clade: Pancrustacea
- Class: Insecta
- Order: Coleoptera
- Suborder: Polyphaga
- Infraorder: Cucujiformia
- Family: Chrysomelidae
- Subfamily: Eumolpinae
- Tribe: Bromiini
- Genus: Fidia; Motschulsky, 1861

Type species
- Fidia atra Motschulsky, 1861

Synonyms
- Endoxus Baly, 1861 (misspelling of Adoxus); Leprotes Baly, 1863; Lypesthes Baly, 1863; Talmonus Fairmaire, 1889

= Fidia =

Genus of leaf beetles

Fidia (formerly known as Lypesthes) is a genus of leaf beetles in the subfamily Eumolpinae. It is distributed in East Asia, Southeast Asia and Africa.

== Taxonomic history ==
In 1861, Victor Motschulsky described a new species of beetle from Japan with the name Fidia atra. In 1863, Joseph Sugar Baly designated Fidia atra as the type species of a newly established genus with the name Lypesthes. In a 2008 review of the New World genus Fidia Baly, 1863, it was determined that Motschulsky's species description made the name Fidia available first, meaning that Lypesthes Baly, 1863 is a junior synonym of Fidia Motschulsky, 1861 and that Fidia Baly, 1863 is a junior homonym.

An application to suppress Fidia Motschulsky, 1861 (with the year incorrectly given as "1860") and conserve usage of Fidia Baly, 1863 and Lypesthes Baly, 1863 was submitted to the ICZN in 2006. This proposal was rejected by the commission in 2009, upholding the priority of Fidia Motschulsky, 1861. Following this ruling, Fidia Baly, 1863 was renamed to Neofidia in 2020.

== Species ==
There are 33 species currently recognised in the genus Fidia:

Subgenus Fidia Motschulsky, 1861

- Fidia albida (Pic, 1923) – Thailand, Laos, Vietnam, Nepal
- Fidia atra Motschulsky, 1861 – Japan, China, Korea, Russian Far East
- Fidia basalis (Chen, 1940) – Southwest China (Yunnan)
- Fidia bicoloripes (Pic, 1936) – Algeria
- Fidia bisquamosa (Chen, 1935) – Vietnam
- Fidia brancuccii (Medvedev, 1993) – Nepal
- Fidia carinata (Eroshkina, 1992) – Vietnam
- Fidia fulva (Baly, 1878) – China, Japan, South Korea
- Fidia gracilicornis (Baly, 1861) – Hong Kong, Taiwan
- Fidia impressa (Pic, 1928) – Vietnam, Laos, Nepal
- Fidia indica (Jacoby, 1908) – Myanmar
- Fidia irregularis (Eroshkina, 1992) – Vietnam
- Fidia itoi (Chûjô, 1954) – Japan
- Fidia japonica (Ohno, 1958) – Japan, South Korea
- Fidia kiiensis (Ohno, 1958) – Japan
- Fidia laeta (Medvedev, 2007) – Indonesia (Sulawesi)
- Fidia lewisi (Baly, 1878) – China, Japan
- Fidia mausonica (Eroshkina, 1992) – Vietnam
- Fidia medvedevi Kumari et al., 2020 – India
- Fidia perelegans (Gressitt & Kimoto, 1961) – Southern China (Guangdong)
- Fidia phoebicola (Tan, 1983) – Southern China (Fujian, Hong Kong)
- Fidia picea (Gressitt & Kimoto, 1961) – Southern China (Guangdong)
- Fidia regalis (Medvedev & Zoia, 1996) – Thailand
- Fidia rufa (Pic, 1924) – Vietnam
- Fidia shirozui (Kimoto, 1969) – Taiwan
- Fidia sinensis (Gressitt & Kimoto, 1961) – Southern China (Guangdong)
- Fidia striata (Eroshkina, 1992) – Vietnam
- Fidia submaculata (Pic, 1924) – Vietnam
- Fidia subregularis (Pic, 1923) – Southern China (Guizhou, Yunnan)
- Fidia sulcatifrons (Gressitt & Kimoto, 1961) – Southern China (Hainan)
- Fidia vietnamica (Eroshkina, 1992) – Vietnam
- Fidia vittata (Zhou & Tan, 1997) – Southern China (Fujian)

Subgenus Lypesthinia Pic, 1939

- Fidia multidentata (Pic, 1939) – Ethiopia
