= Townend Glover =

American entomologist

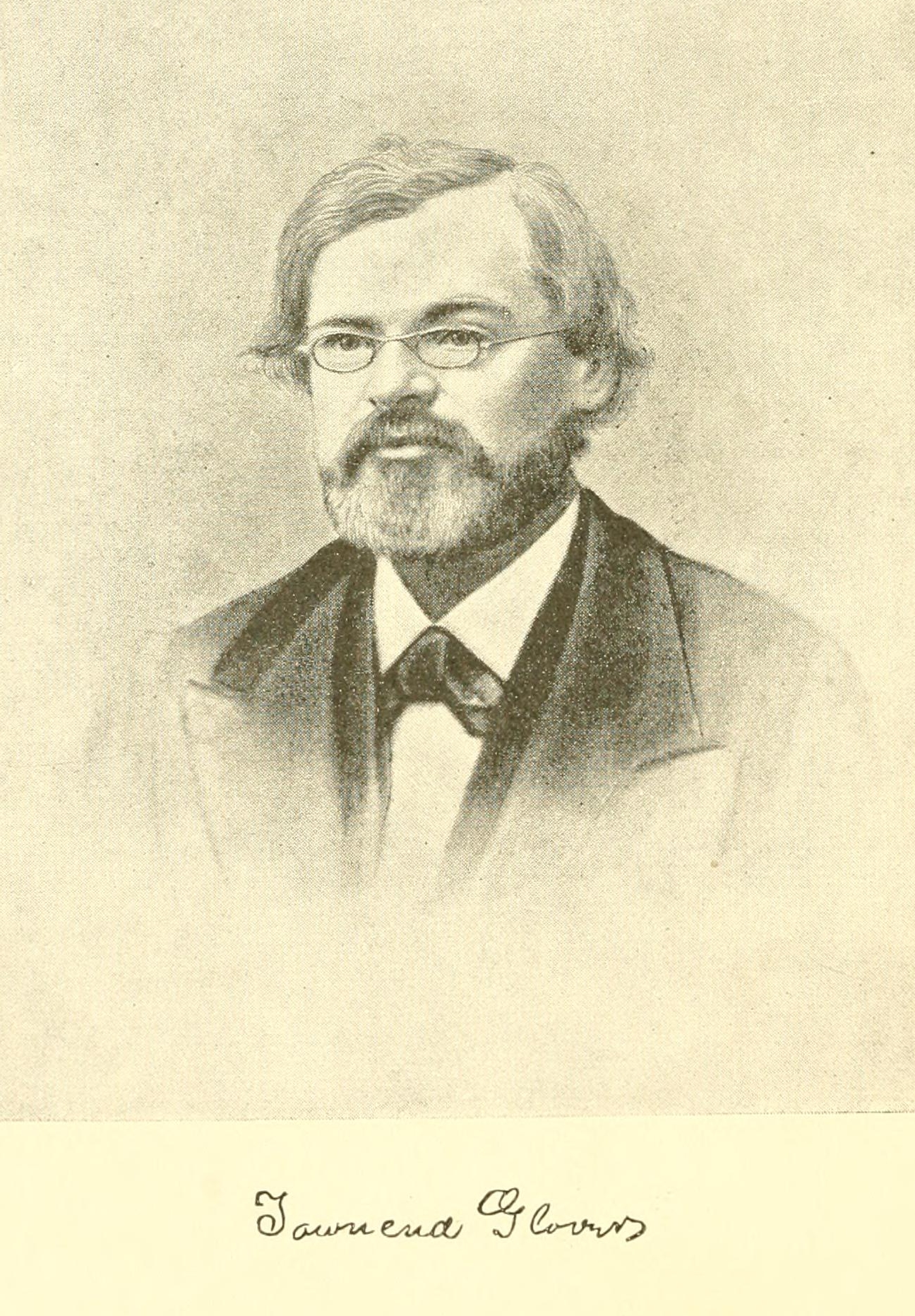
Townend Glover

Townend Glover (February 20, 1813 – September 7, 1883) was an American entomologist and the first appointed United States Entomologist to the newly formed United States Department of Agriculture in 1862. He has been described as one of the "finest illustrators" of insects in the United States.

== Early life ==
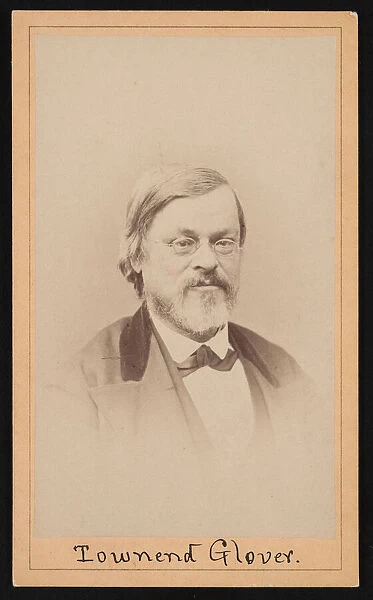

Glover was born in Rio de Janeiro to Henry and Mary Townend Glover, both of whom died when he was just six weeks old. He was sent to Leeds, England, to live with relatives, and came into his inheritance when he turned 21. He used the money to study painting and travel Europe, before returning to Leeds. In 1863, he traveled to the United States, and traveled extensively, especially in the south, before settling in New York state. He married in 1840, and bought his father-in-law's estate in 1846.

== United States Entomologist ==
In 1854, Glover joined the Bureau of Agriculture of the United States Patent Office as an entomologist, and studied a wide range of topics, including sugarcane, citrus insect pests, plant diseases, soils, birds, mammals, reptiles, and Indian mounds, before joining the faculty at Maryland Agricultural College in 1859. In 1862, when the Department of Agriculture became an independent organization, Glover took up his appointment as United States Entomologist. After a trip to an entomological convention in Paris, Glover strongly advocated for the fumigation of imports to the United States, stating "It is well known that several of the insects most destructive to our crops are of European origin, and I would suggest that all foreign seeds and plants imported by this department be subjected to a careful investigation, and if found to be infested by any new or unknown insects, fumigation, or other thoroughly efficacious means of destroying them, should be used before distributing them through the country."

Glover is also credited with using one of the first portable, self contained, lamp lit moth traps.

In 1878, Glover resigned his position at the USDA and moved to Baltimore where he lived with his adopted daughter. He died September 7, 1883.

== Publications ==
Much of Glover's illustrations were privately printed. He often distributed them broadly to entomologists across the globe. However, he struggled to find a publisher for his proposed book, and even refused to illustrate Insects Injurious to Vegetation by T. W. Harris. In 1872, he combined all 273 copper plates and 6,179 figures into Illustrations of North American Entomology in the Orders of Coleoptera, Orthoptera, Neuroptera, Hymenoptera, Lepidoptera, and Diptera. According to Dodge, 250 copies were printed, of which 50 were distributed widely and the rest were destroyed, though Mallis claims that only 15 author's proofs were published (though he wrongly states that they were published in 1887 after Glover had already died).
