= Donald M. Weisman =

American entomologist

Donald M. Weisman (November 4, 1924 - May 30, 2016) was an American entomologist. He is known for his work on the taxonomy of immature Lepidoptera.

== Biography ==
Weisman was born on Nov. 4, 1924 in Mason, Warren County, Ohio to Raymond Ezra "Ray" and Emma Margaret (Miller) Weisman.

In 1950, he received his bachelor's degree in entomology from Miami University, followed by a master's degree 10 years later in North Carolina State University. A year after, he received his MA degree. He was appointed as an entomologist with Insect Identification and Parasite Introduction Research Branch, in the United States Department of Agriculture. He also worked for United States National Museum as an assistant for taxonomic work. He retired from USDA and Systematic Entomology Laboratory in 1986.
