= Frederick Ernst Melsheimer =

American entomologist (1782–1873)

- Born: 1782; Hanover, Pennsylvania
- Died: 10 March 1873 (aged 90–91); Davidsburg, York County, Pennsylvania
- Citizenship: United States
- Education: University of Maryland
- Known for: Coleoptera
- Scientific career
- Fields: Entomology
- Author abbrev. (zoology): Melsheimer

Frederick Ernst Melsheimer, M.D. (1782–1873; first name also spelled Friedrich) was an American entomologist noted for his work on Coleoptera. He was President of the American Entomological Society in 1853. Frederick Ernest Melsheimer's most important work was Catalogue of the described Coleoptera of the United States (1853). His co-authors on that work were John LeConte and S.S. Haldeman. His father, Frederick Valentine Melsheimer (1749–1814) was also an entomologist, as was his elder brother, John Frederick Melsheimer (1780–1829).
