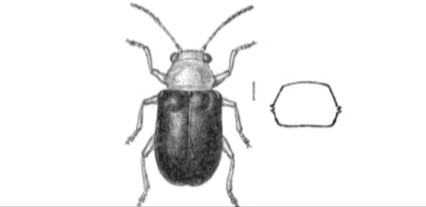
- Aulexis nigripennis

Scientific classification
- Kingdom: Animalia
- Phylum: Arthropoda
- Clade: Pancrustacea
- Class: Insecta
- Order: Coleoptera
- Suborder: Polyphaga
- Infraorder: Cucujiformia
- Family: Chrysomelidae
- Subfamily: Eumolpinae
- Tribe: Bromiini
- Genus: Aulexis; Baly, 1863

Type species
- Aulexis nigricollis Baly, 1863

= Aulexis =

Genus of leaf beetles from Asia

Aulexis is a genus of leaf beetles in the subfamily Eumolpinae. It is distributed in South, East and Southeast Asia. The related genus Goniopleura is sometimes included as a subgenus.

== Description ==
They are elongate, subcylindrical; clothed above and beneath with suberect hairs.

Head exserted, perpendicular; anterior margin of clypeus with two acute flattened teeth, which partly cover the upper surface of the labrum; antennae subfiliform, clothed with coarse hairs, basal joint incrassate, second half the length of the first, subincrassate, third shorter than the fourth, following joints rather shorter; eyes with their inner margins slightly sinuate; terminal joint of palpi slender, ovate. Thorax subcylindrical in front, flattened, more or less excavated on the hinder half of the disc, lateral border obsolete, rarely visible at the base, its place supplied in the middle by two or more teeth. Legs moderate, stout; femora unarmed; basal joint of tarsi as long as the following two united claws more or less bifid. Prosternum greatly narrowed between the coxae.

A well-marked genus on account of the toothed clypeus and similarly armed sides of the thorax.

== Species ==
The genus includes the following species:

- Aulexis abbreviata (Gressitt, 1942) – China (Guangdong)
- Aulexis assamensis Jacoby, 1903 – India (Assam)
- Aulexis atripennis Pic, 1923 – China (Fujian, Yunnan)
- Aulexis aureopilosa Pic, 1944 – Philippines
- Aulexis bicolor Pic, 1929 – Vietnam
- Aulexis bicoloripes Pic, 1929 – Java
- Aulexis bosi Medvedev, 2008 – Sulawesi
- Aulexis brevicornis Weise, 1922 – Philippines
- Aulexis brevidentata (Gressitt, 1942) – China (Hainan)
- Aulexis brevipennis Medvedev, 2012 – Vietnam
- Aulexis brevipilosa Medvedev, 2002 – Philippines
- Aulexis buonloicus Eroshkina, 1988 – Vietnam
- Aulexis carinata Pic, 1935 – China (Guangdong), Vietnam
- Aulexis chengana Chen, 1940 – China (Sichuan)
- Aulexis cinnamomi Chen & Wang, 1976 – China (Yunnan)
- Aulexis donckieri Pic, 1935 – Sumatra
- Aulexis elongata Jacoby, 1881 – Sumatra, Java
- Aulexis erythodera Warchałowski, 2008 – Myanmar
- Aulexis excavata Takizawa, 2017 – Borneo (Sabah)
- Aulexis femoralis Medvedev, 2012 – Vietnam
- Aulexis flavopilosa Lefèvre, 1885 – Philippines
- Aulexis gorbunovi Medvedev, 2009 – Sulawesi
- Aulexis gracilicornis Weise, 1922 – Philippines
- Aulexis gressitti Moseyko, 2024 – China (Hainan)
- Aulexis hochii Chen, 1940 – China (Hainan), Nepal, Vietnam
- Aulexis humilis Lefèvre, 1885 – Thailand
- Aulexis jiangkouensis Tan, 1993 – China (Guizhou)
- Aulexis kinabaluensis Takizawa, 2017 – Borneo (Sabah)
- Aulexis languei Lefèvre, 1893 – Vietnam
- Aulexis longicornis Jacoby, 1899 – Peninsular Malaysia, Sumatra, Borneo (Kalimantan)
- Aulexis luzonica Lefèvre, 1885 – Philippines
- Aulexis medvedevi Eroshkina, 1988 – Vietnam
- Aulexis minor Kimoto & Gressitt, 1982 – Thailand
- Aulexis minuta Pic, 1935 – Philippines
- Aulexis nepalensis Medvedev & Sprecher-Uebersax, 1997 – Nepal, India
- Aulexis nigricollis Baly, 1863 – Borneo (Sarawak)
- Aulexis nigripennis Jacoby, 1908 – Nepal, Myanmar
- Aulexis nigripennis Kimoto & Gressitt, 1982 (homonym) – Vietnam
- Aulexis obscura Gressitt, 1945 – China (Yunnan)
- Aulexis obscura Takizawa, 2017 (homonym) – Borneo (Sabah)
- Aulexis pallida Lefèvre, 1887 – Bali, Sumatra
- Aulexis philippinensis Jacoby, 1895 – Philippines
- Aulexis puberula Lefèvre, 1885 – Philippines
- Aulexis pusilla Lefèvre, 1885 – Philippines
- Aulexis rufescens Pic, 1944 – Philippines
- Aulexis semiobscurus Pic, 1921 – Lombok
- Aulexis shaowuensis Gressitt & Kimoto, 1961 – China (Fujian)
- Aulexis sichuanensis Tan, 1992 – China (Sichuan)
- Aulexis sinensis Chen, 1934 – China (Fujian, Guizhou, Guangxi)
- Aulexis sumatrana Jacoby, 1896 – Peninsular Malaysia, Sumatra
- Aulexis tibialis Jacoby, 1889 – India, Myanmar
- Aulexis tuberculata Tan, 1993 – China (Guizhou)
- Aulexis unicolor (Gressitt, 1942) – China (Guangdong)
- Aulexis unispinosa Pic, 1935 – Vietnam
- Aulexis varians Baly, 1867 – Peninsular Malaysia, Borneo (Sarawak)
- Aulexis ventralis (Gressitt, 1942) – China (Sichuan)
- Aulexis vietnamicus Eroshkina, 1988 – Vietnam
- Aulexis wallacei Baly, 1867 – Peninsular Malaysia, Singapore, Borneo, Sumatra, Sulawesi

Renamed species:

- Aulexis gracilicornis Gressitt & Kimoto, 1961 (preoccupied by Aulexis gracilicornis Weise, 1922): renamed to Aulexis gressitti Moseyko, 2024
