= Aulexis assamensis =

Scientific classification
- Kingdom: Animalia
- Phylum: Arthropoda
- Clade: Pancrustacea
- Class: Insecta
- Order: Coleoptera
- Suborder: Polyphaga
- Infraorder: Cucujiformia
- Family: Chrysomelidae
- Genus: Aulexis
- Species: A. assamensis

Binomial name
- Aulexis assamensis Jacoby, 1903

Species of beetles

Aulexis assamensis is a species of beetle in the leaf beetle family (Chrysomelidae), native to Assam (India). The scientific name of the species was published in 1903 by Martin Jacoby.

== Description ==
It has Fulvous; head and thorax nearly black; elytra clothed with flavous pubescence.
