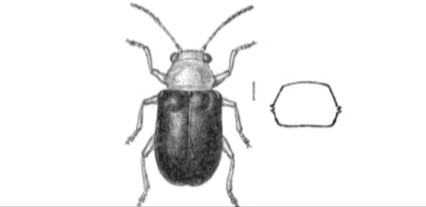

Scientific classification
- Kingdom: Animalia
- Phylum: Arthropoda
- Clade: Pancrustacea
- Class: Insecta
- Order: Coleoptera
- Suborder: Polyphaga
- Infraorder: Cucujiformia
- Family: Chrysomelidae
- Genus: Aulexis
- Species: A. nigripennis

Binomial name
- Aulexis nigripennis Jacoby, 1908

= Aulexis nigripennis =

Species of beetles

Aulexis nigripennis is a species of beetle in the leaf beetle family (Chrysomelidae), distributed in Myanmar and Nepal. The scientific name of the species was published in 1908 by Martin Jacoby, who described it from Thandaung in Tenasserim.

== Description ==
It is fulvous; the terminal joints of the antennae are black; dorsally, it is clothed with short grey pubescence; the elytra are black.
