= Aulexis nigricollis =

Scientific classification
- Kingdom: Animalia
- Phylum: Arthropoda
- Clade: Pancrustacea
- Class: Insecta
- Order: Coleoptera
- Suborder: Polyphaga
- Infraorder: Cucujiformia
- Family: Chrysomelidae
- Genus: Aulexis
- Species: A. nigricollis

Binomial name
- Aulexis nigricollis Baly, 1863

Species of beetles

Aulexis nigricollis is a species of beetle in the leaf beetle family (Chrysomelidae), native to Borneo (Sarawak). The scientific name of the species was published in 1863 by Joseph Sugar Baly.

== Description ==
Elongate, parallel, rufo-fuscous, subnitidous, covered with long silky subdepressed fulvous hairs; thorax and upper portion of head black, sides of the former armed with three acute teeth; antennae and legs fulvous.
