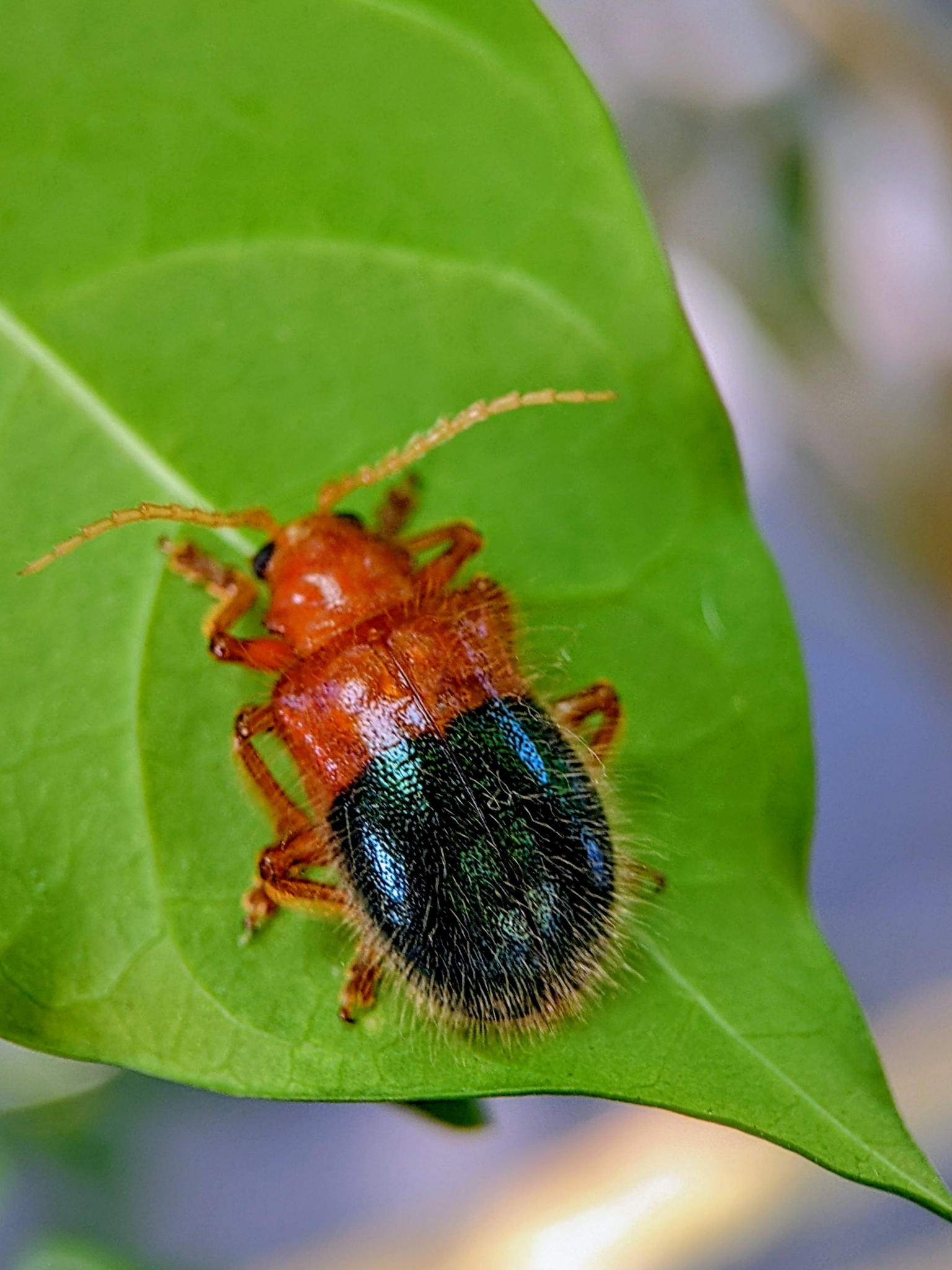
- Goniopleura auricoma

Scientific classification
- Kingdom: Animalia
- Phylum: Arthropoda
- Clade: Pancrustacea
- Class: Insecta
- Order: Coleoptera
- Suborder: Polyphaga
- Infraorder: Cucujiformia
- Family: Chrysomelidae
- Subfamily: Eumolpinae
- Tribe: Bromiini
- Genus: Goniopleura; Westwood, 1832

Type species
- Goniopleura auricoma Westwood, 1832

= Goniopleura =

Genus of leaf beetles

Goniopleura is a genus of leaf beetles in the subfamily Eumolpinae. It is found in Southeast Asia. It closely resembles Aulexis and has sometimes been treated as a subgenus of it.

== Species ==
The genus contains nine species:

- Goniopleura auricoma Westwood, 1832
  - Goniopleura auricoma auricoma Westwood, 1832 – Peninsular Malaysia (Penang)
  - Goniopleura auricoma basalis Jacoby, 1882 – Sumatra
  - Goniopleura auricoma bicoloripes Gahan, 1895 – Java
  - Goniopleura auricoma borneensis Medvedev, 1998 – Borneo (Sarawak)
  - Goniopleura auricoma niasica Medvedev, 1998 – Nias
- Goniopleura chapuisi Thomson, 1875 – Borneo (Sabah, Sarawak)
- Goniopleura fulva Medvedev & Romantsov, 2014 – Borneo (Sabah)
- Goniopleura kinabaluensis Takizawa, 2017 – Borneo (Sabah)
- Goniopleura moseri Weise, 1922 – North Vietnam
- Goniopleura nigriventris Medvedev, 1998 – North Sumatra, Peninsular Malaysia (Perak)
- Goniopleura shuteae Medvedev, 2011 – Borneo (Sabah)
- Goniopleura tonkinea Pic, 1928 (synonym: Goniopleura suturalis Pic, 1928) – Laos, Vietnam
- Goniopleura viridipennis Clark, 1865
  - Goniopleura viridipennis nigripes Medvedev, 1998 – Borneo (Sabah)
  - Goniopleura viridipennis sumatrana Medvedev, 1998 – Sumatra
  - Goniopleura viridipennis viridipennis Clark, 1865 – Peninsular Malaysia (Penang, Malacca)
