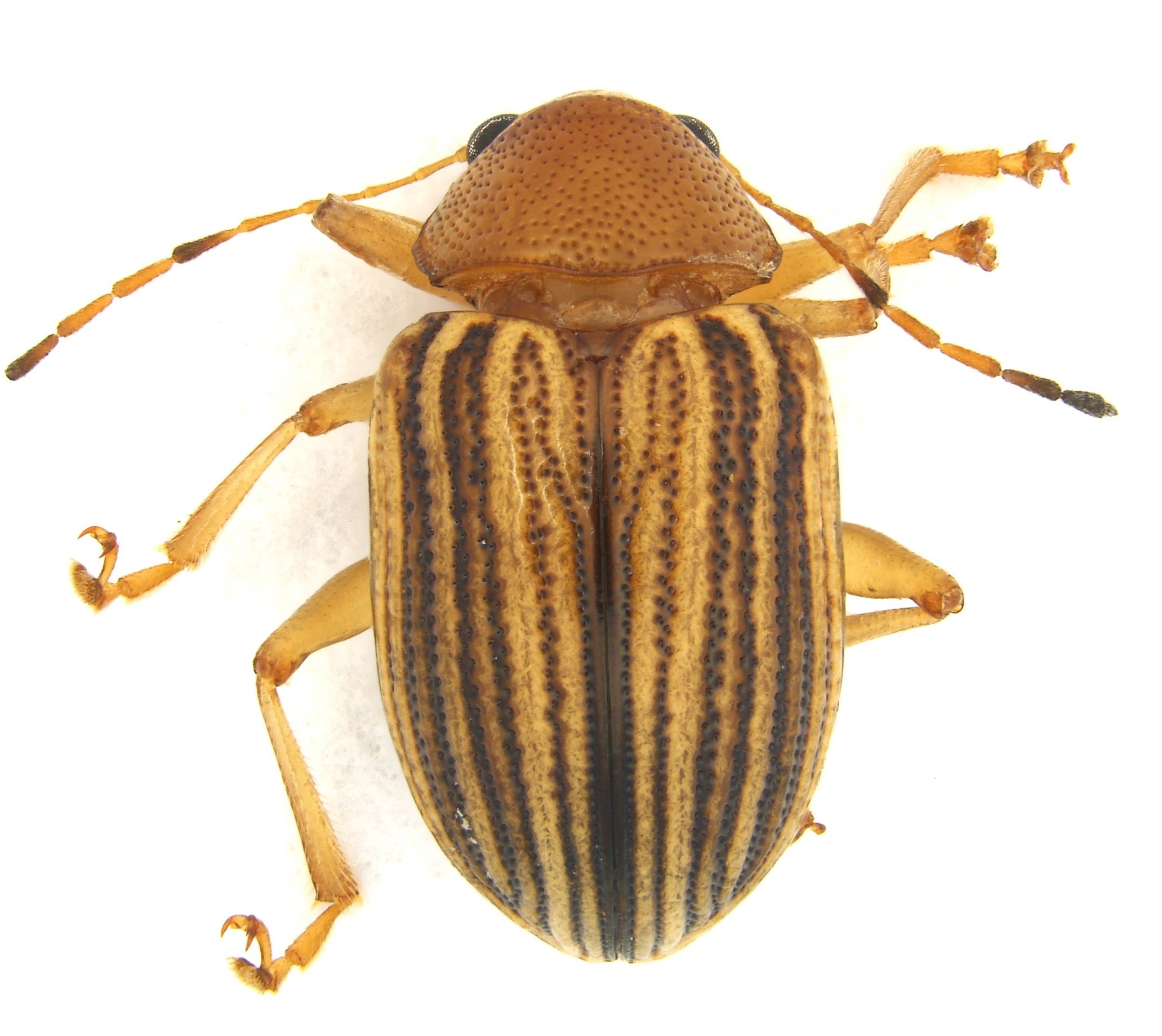
- Dorsal view of an adult Colaspis floridana beetle

Scientific classification
- Kingdom: Animalia
- Phylum: Arthropoda
- Class: Insecta
- Order: Coleoptera
- Suborder: Polyphaga
- Infraorder: Cucujiformia
- Family: Chrysomelidae
- Genus: Colaspis
- Species: C. floridana

Binomial name
- Colaspis floridana Schaeffer (1933)

Synonyms
- Colaspis brunnea floridana Schaeffer, 1933

= Colaspis floridana =

Species of beetle

Colaspis floridana is a species of leaf beetle from North America. It mainly occurs in the southeastern United States, including Florida, Georgia, North Carolina, and South Carolina.

== Description ==
In the adult stage, Colaspis floridana is a small oval beetle, between 4.0 and 5.5 mm (0.16 and 0.22 in) in length. Its color is yellowish-brown to pale reddish-brown, with rows of darker brown punctures on its elytra. It is very similar to the closely related Colaspis brunnea, but is readily distinguished by the first two elytral costae being wider and separated by a single row of punctures.

== Taxonomy ==
Colaspis floridana was originally described by Charles Schaeffer in 1933 as a variety of Colaspis brunnea, and was elevated to species rank in 1974 by Doris Blake. Another species of Colaspis was mistakenly described under the same name by Blake in 1977; after discovering the error, Edward Riley renamed that species as C. pseudofavosa.

== Biology ==
Although little has been published specific to the larval behavior of C. floridana, its life history is likely to be similar to that of closely related species such as C. brunnea, in which the larvae feed underground on roots of grasses and forbs, overwinter underground, and emerge as an adults in the following year. The adult stage feeds on leaves of a wide range of plants, including crop species such as soybean, okra, and peanut, as well as ornamental plants such as rose and crapemyrtle, although it has not been reported as an economically damaging pest.
