= Colaspis pini =

Scientific classification
- Kingdom: Animalia
- Phylum: Arthropoda
- Clade: Pancrustacea
- Class: Insecta
- Order: Coleoptera
- Suborder: Polyphaga
- Infraorder: Cucujiformia
- Family: Chrysomelidae
- Genus: Colaspis
- Species: C. pini

Binomial name
- Colaspis pini Barber, 1937

Species of beetle

Colaspis pini, the pine colaspis, is a species of leaf beetle from North America. It is known to feed on pines in the southern United States, and is an occasional pest of Christmas trees. It was first described by the American entomologist Herbert Spencer Barber in 1937.

Colaspis pini resembles Colaspis brunnea (the grape colaspis), and is externally almost identical to Colaspis flavocostata but differs in the shape of the aedeagus.

== Subspecies ==
These two subspecies belong to the species Colaspis pini:

- Colaspis pini pini Barber, 1937^{i c g}
- Colaspis pini schotti Barber, 1937^{i c g}

Data sources: i = ITIS, c = Catalogue of Life, g = GBIF, b = Bugguide.net
