= Colaspis louisianae =

Scientific classification
- Kingdom: Animalia
- Phylum: Arthropoda
- Clade: Pancrustacea
- Class: Insecta
- Order: Coleoptera
- Suborder: Polyphaga
- Infraorder: Cucujiformia
- Family: Chrysomelidae
- Genus: Colaspis
- Species: C. louisianae

Binomial name
- Colaspis louisianae Blake, 1974

Species of beetle

Colaspis louisianae is a species of leaf beetle from North America. It is distributed in Texas and Louisiana in the United States. It is close in appearance to Colaspis brunnea.

According to Chapin (1979), C. louisianae is the most common species of the genus Colaspis in field crops in Louisiana.
