= Colaspis crinicornis =

Scientific classification
- Kingdom: Animalia
- Phylum: Arthropoda
- Clade: Pancrustacea
- Class: Insecta
- Order: Coleoptera
- Suborder: Polyphaga
- Infraorder: Cucujiformia
- Family: Chrysomelidae
- Genus: Colaspis
- Species: C. crinicornis

Binomial name
- Colaspis crinicornis Schaeffer, 1933

Species of beetle

Colaspis crinicornis is a species of leaf beetle from North America. It primarily occurs in the Great Plains of the United States. It was first described by the American entomologist Charles Frederic August Schaeffer in 1933. Though it has not historically been considered a pest, population densities of the species have been increasing in corn and soybean over the last decade in southeastern Nebraska. A study has found C. crinicornis to be univoltine in the same region, and that it overwinters in soil as larvae. It has also been found that diets of corn or soybean leaves do not affect the consumption, longevity or fecundity of adult C. crinicornis.

== Subspecies ==
These two subspecies belong to the species Colaspis crinicornis:

- Colaspis crinicornis chittendeni Blake, 1974^{i c g}
- Colaspis crinicornis crinicornis Schaeffer, 1933^{i c g}

Data sources: i = ITIS, c = Catalogue of Life, g = GBIF, b = Bugguide.net
