= Colaspis hesperia =

Scientific classification
- Kingdom: Animalia
- Phylum: Arthropoda
- Clade: Pancrustacea
- Class: Insecta
- Order: Coleoptera
- Suborder: Polyphaga
- Infraorder: Cucujiformia
- Family: Chrysomelidae
- Genus: Colaspis
- Species: C. hesperia

Binomial name
- Colaspis hesperia Blake, 1974

Species of beetle

Colaspis hesperia is a species of leaf beetle from North America. Its range spans from Arizona to Texas and south to Mexico. The specific name, hesperia, is derived from the Greek for "western". It is closely related to Colaspis brunnea.
