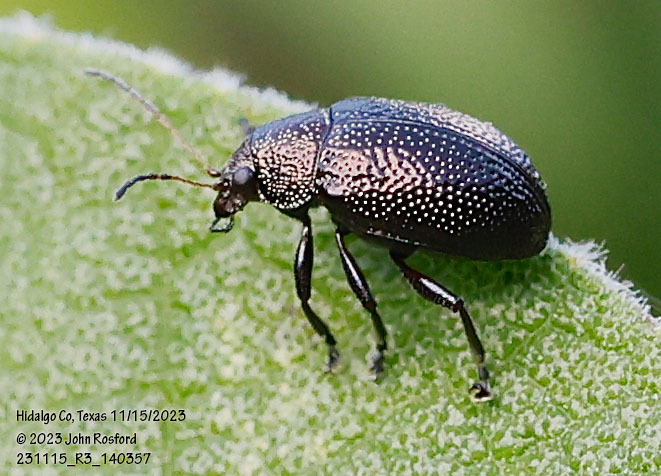

Scientific classification
- Kingdom: Animalia
- Phylum: Arthropoda
- Clade: Pancrustacea
- Class: Insecta
- Order: Coleoptera
- Suborder: Polyphaga
- Infraorder: Cucujiformia
- Family: Chrysomelidae
- Genus: Colaspis
- Species: C. brownsvillensis

Binomial name
- Colaspis brownsvillensis Blake, 1976

= Colaspis brownsvillensis =

Species of beetle

Colaspis brownsvillensis, the Brownsville milkvine leaf beetle, is a species of leaf beetle found in the state of Texas in the United States. It was first described by the American entomologist Doris Holmes Blake in 1976 from Brownsville, Texas, after which the species is named. It is a close relative of Colaspis nigrocyanea.
