= Colaspis pseudofavosa =

Scientific classification
- Kingdom: Animalia
- Phylum: Arthropoda
- Clade: Pancrustacea
- Class: Insecta
- Order: Coleoptera
- Suborder: Polyphaga
- Infraorder: Cucujiformia
- Family: Chrysomelidae
- Genus: Colaspis
- Species: C. pseudofavosa

Binomial name
- Colaspis pseudofavosa E. Riley, 1978

Synonyms
- Colaspis floridana Blake, 1977 (nec Schaeffer, 1933)

Species of beetle

Colaspis pseudofavosa is a species of leaf beetle from North America. It is a post-harvest pest of blueberries in the southeastern United States, and also feeds on plants such as southern wax myrtles (Myrica cerifera) and pecans (Carya illinoinensis).

The species was originally described under the name Colaspis floridana by the American entomologist Doris Holmes Blake in 1977. However, this name was already used by a species described by Charles Frederic August Schaeffer in 1933, so it was renamed by Edward G. Riley to Colaspis pseudofavosa the following year. This name was chosen for the species' similarity to Colaspis favosa.
