= Colaspis viridiceps =

Scientific classification
- Kingdom: Animalia
- Phylum: Arthropoda
- Clade: Pancrustacea
- Class: Insecta
- Order: Coleoptera
- Suborder: Polyphaga
- Infraorder: Cucujiformia
- Family: Chrysomelidae
- Genus: Colaspis
- Species: C. viridiceps

Binomial name
- Colaspis viridiceps Schaeffer, 1933

Species of beetle

Colaspis viridiceps is a species of leaf beetle from North America. Its range spans from Arizona to New Mexico and south to Mexico. It was first described by the American entomologist Charles Frederic August Schaeffer in 1933.

== Subspecies ==
There are two subspecies of C. viridiceps:

- Colaspis viridiceps australis Blake, 1976
- Colaspis viridiceps viridiceps Schaeffer, 1933
