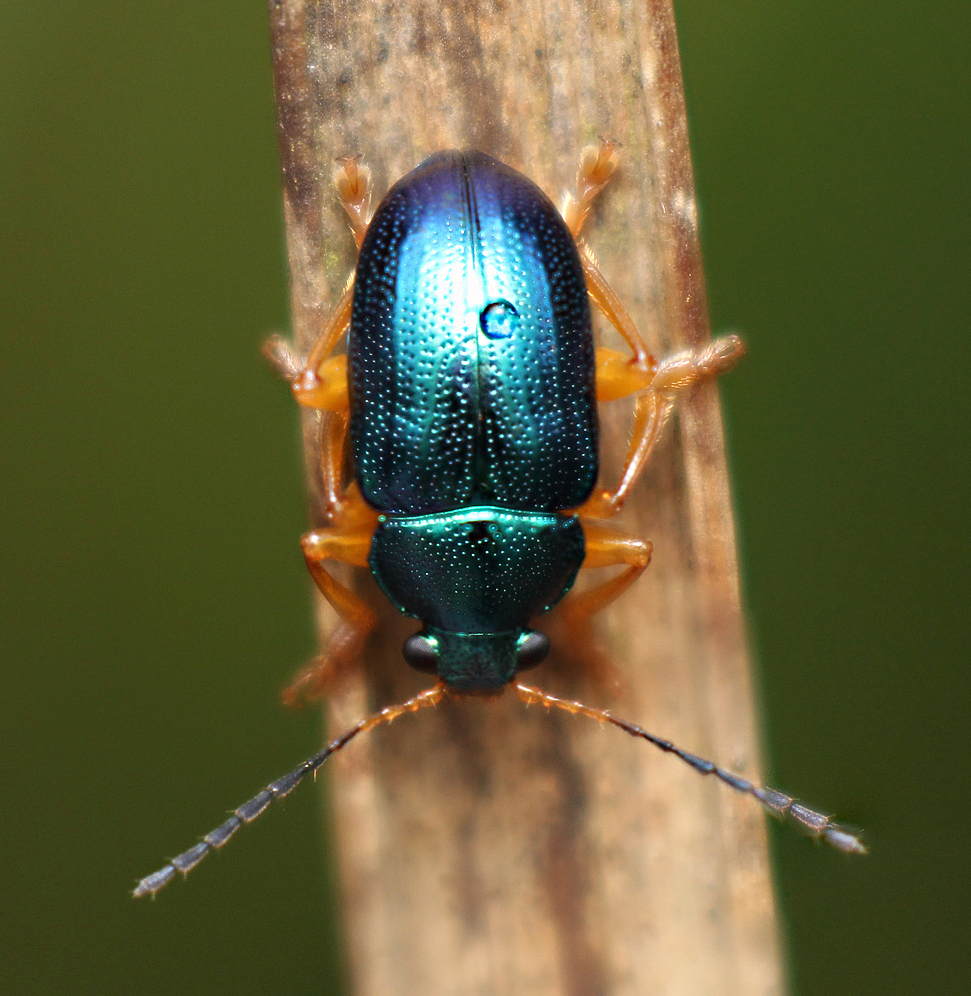
- Nodocolaspis costipennis

Scientific classification
- Kingdom: Animalia
- Phylum: Arthropoda
- Clade: Pancrustacea
- Class: Insecta
- Order: Coleoptera
- Suborder: Polyphaga
- Infraorder: Cucujiformia
- Family: Chrysomelidae
- Subfamily: Eumolpinae
- Tribe: Eumolpini
- Genus: Nodocolaspis; Bechyné, 1949

Type species
- Colaspis costipennis Lefèvre, 1877

= Nodocolaspis =

Genus of leaf beetles from Central and South America

Nodocolaspis is a genus of leaf beetles in the subfamily Eumolpinae. It is known from Central America and South America. The genus was first established by the Czech entomologist Jan Bechyné in 1949, as a relative of Nodonota (now known as Brachypnoea) containing species formerly placed in Colaspis.

== Species ==
The following species are included in Nodocolaspis:

- Nodocolaspis antennalis Bechyné, 1953
- Nodocolaspis colombica (Jacoby, 1900)
- Nodocolaspis costipennis (Lefèvre, 1877)
  - Nodocolaspis costipennis cayennensis Bechyné, 1955
  - Nodocolaspis costipennis costipennis (Lefèvre, 1877)
- Nodocolaspis femoralis (Lefèvre, 1878)
- Nodocolaspis impressa (Lefèvre, 1877)
- Nodocolaspis multicostata (Jacoby, 1900)
- Nodocolaspis paulistana Bechyné, 1953
- Nodocolaspis quadrifoveata (Bowditch, 1921)
- Nodocolaspis rugulosa Bechyné, 1953
- Nodocolaspis smaragdina Bechyné & Bechyné, 1964
- Nodocolaspis tarsata (Lefèvre, 1882)
  - Nodocolaspis tarsata acallosa (Bechyné, 1949)
  - Nodocolaspis tarsata tarsata (Lefèvre, 1882)
- Nodocolaspis tuberculata Bechyné, 1953

The type species, N. costipennis, was originally described as "Colaspis costipennis" by Lefèvre in 1877, which makes the name a junior homonym of Colaspis costipennis Crotch, 1873; however, Jan Bechyné considered it worthless to correct the homonymy after having established a new genus for the Lefèvre species. Separately, Doris Holmes Blake renamed the Lefèvre species to "Colaspis lophodes" in 1974.

The generic placement of the Central American species N. femoralis and N. impressa is uncertain; they were transferred to Nodocolaspis from Colaspis by Jan Bechyné in 1953 and 1958, but Flowers (1996) disagreed with the validity of the transfers and included them in Colaspis, where they have been traditionally placed.
