= Colaspis planicostata =

Scientific classification
- Kingdom: Animalia
- Phylum: Arthropoda
- Clade: Pancrustacea
- Class: Insecta
- Order: Coleoptera
- Suborder: Polyphaga
- Infraorder: Cucujiformia
- Family: Chrysomelidae
- Genus: Colaspis
- Species: C. planicostata

Binomial name
- Colaspis planicostata Blake, 1974

Species of beetle

Colaspis planicostata is a species of leaf beetle from North America. It is distributed in southern Texas and in Mexico. It is differentiated from Colaspis brunnea and related species in the United States by the color of the ventral surface, which is dark with a metallic green luster.
