= Hystiopsis exarata =

Scientific classification
- Kingdom: Animalia
- Phylum: Arthropoda
- Clade: Pancrustacea
- Class: Insecta
- Order: Coleoptera
- Suborder: Polyphaga
- Infraorder: Cucujiformia
- Family: Chrysomelidae
- Genus: Hystiopsis
- Species: H. exarata

Binomial name
- Hystiopsis exarata Blake, 1966

Species of beetle

Hystiopsis exarata is a species of beetle of the family Chrysomelidae. It is found in Brazil and Argentina.

== Description ==
Adults reach a length of about 4.5–7 mm. Adults are pale yellow brown. The elytron often has metallic blue or purplish markings and a large spot just below the middle and a smaller spot at the apical curve.
