= Eccoptopsis =

Scientific classification
- Kingdom: Animalia
- Phylum: Arthropoda
- Clade: Pancrustacea
- Class: Insecta
- Order: Coleoptera
- Suborder: Polyphaga
- Infraorder: Cucujiformia
- Family: Chrysomelidae
- Tribe: Luperini
- Subtribe: Diabroticina
- Genus: Eccoptopsis; Blake, 1966

Genus of leaf beetles

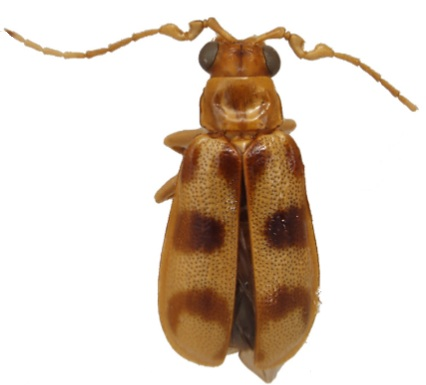
Eccoptopsis costaricensis

Eccoptopsis is a genus of beetles belonging to the family Chrysomelidae.

== Species ==
- Eccoptopsis antennata (Jacoby, 1892)
- Eccoptopsis argentinensis Blake, 1966
- Eccoptopsis boliviensis Blake, 1966
- Eccoptopsis cavifrons (Jacoby, 1887)
- Eccoptopsis clara Blake, 1966
- Eccoptopsis costaricensis Blake, 1966
- Eccoptopsis cyanocosmesa (Blake, 1966)
- Eccoptopsis denticornis (Jacoby, 1887)
- Eccoptopsis laticollis Blake, 1966
- Eccoptopsis mexicana Blake, 1966
- Eccoptopsis piceofasciata (Blake, 1966)
- Eccoptopsis quadrimaculata Blake, 1966
