= Colaspis arizonensis =

Scientific classification
- Kingdom: Animalia
- Phylum: Arthropoda
- Clade: Pancrustacea
- Class: Insecta
- Order: Coleoptera
- Suborder: Polyphaga
- Infraorder: Cucujiformia
- Family: Chrysomelidae
- Genus: Colaspis
- Species: C. arizonensis

Binomial name
- Colaspis arizonensis Schaeffer, 1933

Species of beetle

Colaspis arizonensis is a species of leaf beetle from North America. It is found in southeast Arizona and northwest Mexico. It was first described by the American entomologist Charles Frederic August Schaeffer in 1933.
