= Colaspis suilla =

Scientific classification
- Kingdom: Animalia
- Phylum: Arthropoda
- Clade: Pancrustacea
- Class: Insecta
- Order: Coleoptera
- Suborder: Polyphaga
- Infraorder: Cucujiformia
- Family: Chrysomelidae
- Genus: Colaspis
- Species: C. suilla

Binomial name
- Colaspis suilla Fabricius, 1801

Synonyms
- Colaspis suilla borealis Blake, 1974

Species of beetle

Colaspis suilla is a species of leaf beetle. It is found in eastern North America.
