= Hystiopsis peruensis =

Scientific classification
- Kingdom: Animalia
- Phylum: Arthropoda
- Clade: Pancrustacea
- Class: Insecta
- Order: Coleoptera
- Suborder: Polyphaga
- Infraorder: Cucujiformia
- Family: Chrysomelidae
- Genus: Hystiopsis
- Species: H. peruensis

Binomial name
- Hystiopsis peruensis Blake, 1966

Species of beetle

Hystiopsis peruensis is a species of beetle of the family Chrysomelidae. It is found in Peru.

== Description ==
Adults reach a length of about 6.5 mm. Adults are pale yellow with a dark brown head. The elytron has a metallic blue vitta, a short sutural vitta and a median spot.
