= Hystiopsis grossa =

Scientific classification
- Kingdom: Animalia
- Phylum: Arthropoda
- Clade: Pancrustacea
- Class: Insecta
- Order: Coleoptera
- Suborder: Polyphaga
- Infraorder: Cucujiformia
- Family: Chrysomelidae
- Genus: Hystiopsis
- Species: H. grossa

Binomial name
- Hystiopsis grossa Blake, 1966

Species of beetle

Hystiopsis grossa is a species of beetle of the family Chrysomelidae. It is found in Ecuador.

== Description ==
Adults reach a length of about 8–10 mm. Adults are pale yellow brown with a piceous head. The elytron is dark with a metallic green or purplish sheen. The margin, apex and four spots are all pale yellow brown.
