= Hystiopsis mansei =

Scientific classification
- Kingdom: Animalia
- Phylum: Arthropoda
- Clade: Pancrustacea
- Class: Insecta
- Order: Coleoptera
- Suborder: Polyphaga
- Infraorder: Cucujiformia
- Family: Chrysomelidae
- Genus: Hystiopsis
- Species: H. mansei

Binomial name
- Hystiopsis mansei Blake, 1966

Species of beetle

Hystiopsis mansei is a species of beetle of the family Chrysomelidae. It is found in Venezuela and Brazil.

== Description ==
Adults reach a length of about 6.5 mm. Adults are pale yellow brown, with a piceous head. The elytron has piceous or dark blue spots.
