= Colaspis recurva =

Scientific classification
- Kingdom: Animalia
- Phylum: Arthropoda
- Clade: Pancrustacea
- Class: Insecta
- Order: Coleoptera
- Suborder: Polyphaga
- Infraorder: Cucujiformia
- Family: Chrysomelidae
- Genus: Colaspis
- Species: C. recurva

Binomial name
- Colaspis recurva Blake, 1974

Species of beetle

Colaspis recurva is a species of leaf beetle from North America. It is found in coastal states, its range spanning from Virginia south to Florida west to Louisiana.
