= Hystiopsis nigriventris =

Scientific classification
- Kingdom: Animalia
- Phylum: Arthropoda
- Clade: Pancrustacea
- Class: Insecta
- Order: Coleoptera
- Suborder: Polyphaga
- Infraorder: Cucujiformia
- Family: Chrysomelidae
- Genus: Hystiopsis
- Species: H. nigriventris

Binomial name
- Hystiopsis nigriventris Blake, 1966

Species of beetle

Hystiopsis nigriventris is a species of beetle of the family Chrysomelidae. It is found in Peru.

== Description ==
Adults reach a length of about 7 mm. The head, breast and abdomen are dark, while the prothorax and elytron are pale yellow. The elytron has a dark vitta.
