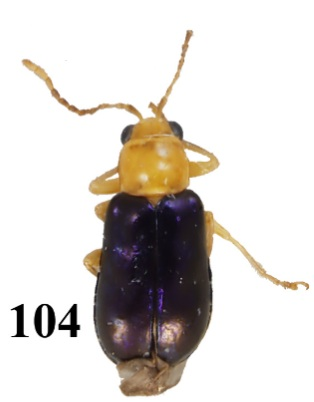

Scientific classification
- Kingdom: Animalia
- Phylum: Arthropoda
- Clade: Pancrustacea
- Class: Insecta
- Order: Coleoptera
- Suborder: Polyphaga
- Infraorder: Cucujiformia
- Family: Chrysomelidae
- Genus: Ectmesopus
- Species: E. darlingtoni

Binomial name
- Ectmesopus darlingtoni Blake, 1940

= Ectmesopus darlingtoni =

Species of beetle

Ectmesopus darlingtoni is a species of beetle of the family Chrysomelidae. It is found in Haiti.
