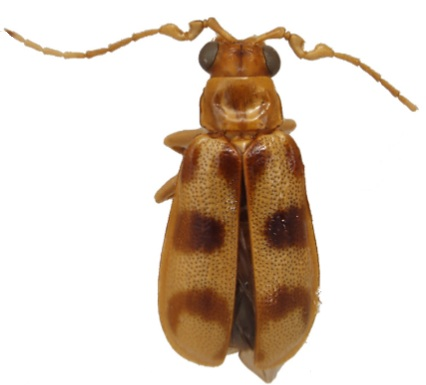

Scientific classification
- Kingdom: Animalia
- Phylum: Arthropoda
- Clade: Pancrustacea
- Class: Insecta
- Order: Coleoptera
- Suborder: Polyphaga
- Infraorder: Cucujiformia
- Family: Chrysomelidae
- Genus: Eccoptopsis
- Species: E. costaricensis

Binomial name
- Eccoptopsis costaricensis Blake, 1966

= Eccoptopsis costaricensis =

Species of beetle

Eccoptopsis costaricensis is a species of beetle of the family Chrysomelidae. It is found in Costa Rica.

== Description ==
Adults reach a length of about 8 mm.
