= Hystiopsis bryanti =

Scientific classification
- Kingdom: Animalia
- Phylum: Arthropoda
- Clade: Pancrustacea
- Class: Insecta
- Order: Coleoptera
- Suborder: Polyphaga
- Infraorder: Cucujiformia
- Family: Chrysomelidae
- Genus: Hystiopsis
- Species: H. bryanti

Binomial name
- Hystiopsis bryanti Blake, 1966

Species of beetle

Hystiopsis bryanti is a species of beetle of the family Chrysomelidae. It is found in Trinidad.

== Description ==
Adults reach a length of about 6 mm. Adults are yellow brown. There is a brown lateral vitta and a brown area on the elytron.
