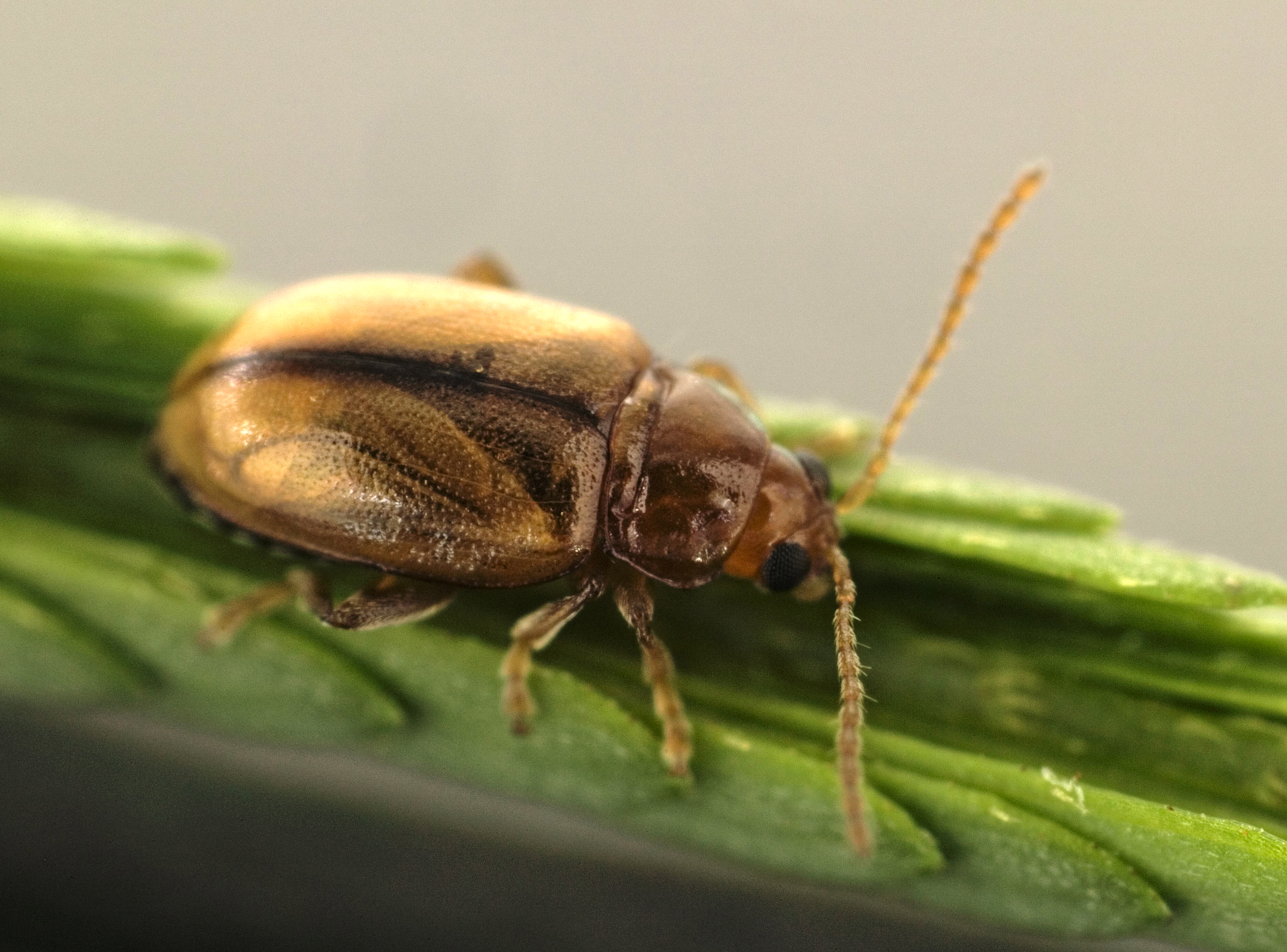
- Nesaecrepida infuscata

Scientific classification
- Kingdom: Animalia
- Phylum: Arthropoda
- Clade: Pancrustacea
- Class: Insecta
- Order: Coleoptera
- Suborder: Polyphaga
- Infraorder: Cucujiformia
- Family: Chrysomelidae
- Subfamily: Galerucinae
- Tribe: Alticini
- Genus: Nesaecrepida; Blake, 1964

= Nesaecrepida =

Genus of beetles

Nesaecrepida is a genus of flea beetles in the family Chrysomelidae. There are two described species in Nesaecrepida, found in North America, Mexico, and the West Indies.

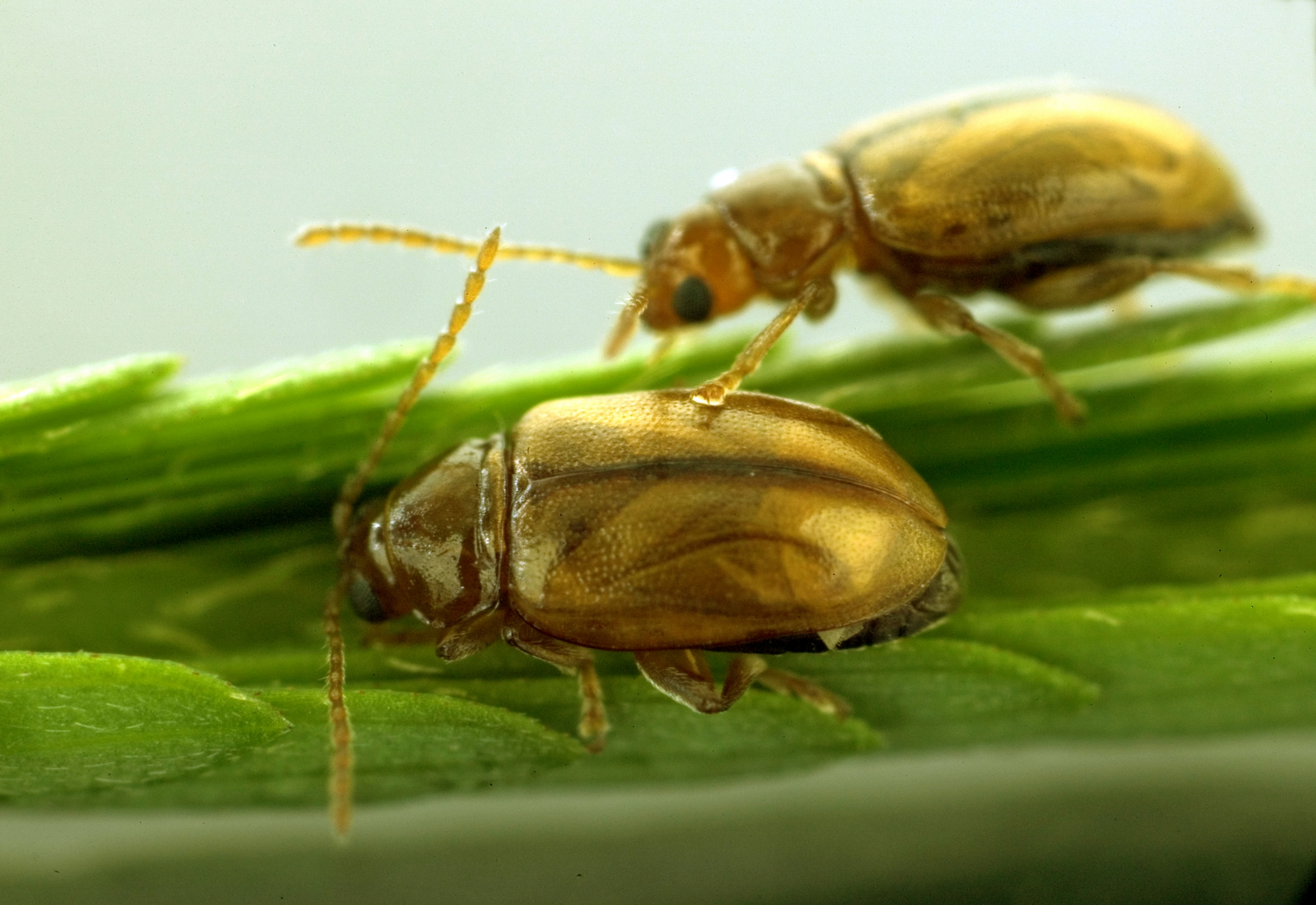
Nesaecrepida infuscata

== Species ==
- Nesaecrepida asphaltina (Suffrian, 1868)
- Nesaecrepida infuscata (Schaeffer, 1906)
