= Zenocolaspis =

Scientific classification
- Kingdom: Animalia
- Phylum: Arthropoda
- Clade: Pancrustacea
- Class: Insecta
- Order: Coleoptera
- Suborder: Polyphaga
- Infraorder: Cucujiformia
- Family: Chrysomelidae
- Subfamily: Eumolpinae
- Tribe: Eumolpini
- Genus: Zenocolaspis; Bechyné, 1997

Type species
- Colaspis inconstans Lefèvre, 1878

Genus of leaf beetles

Zenocolaspis is a genus of leaf beetles in the subfamily Eumolpinae. It is known from North and South America. The genus is very similar to Colaspis (also known as Maecolaspis), but the body is smaller and the eyes are strongly convex and prominent externally.

The genus was established by the Czech entomologist Jan Bechyné in a monograph titled "Evaluación de los datos sobre los Phytophaga dañinos en Venezuela (Coleoptera)" before his death in 1973, but the work (including the description of the genus) was unpublished until October 1997. However, as early as 1968 it was indicated that some species from Colaspis had been moved to Zenocolaspis, before the formal description of the latter was published.

== Species ==
There are two recognized species:

- Zenocolaspis inconstans (Lefèvre, 1878)
  - Zenocolaspis inconstans constituta (Bechyné, 1951)
  - Zenocolaspis inconstans inconstans (Lefèvre, 1878)
  - Zenocolaspis inconstans lividipes (Lefèvre, 1884)
  - Zenocolaspis inconstans nicoletta (Bechyné, 1950)
  - Zenocolaspis inconstans pusilla (Lefèvre, 1884)
  - Zenocolaspis inconstans semidistincta (Bechyné, 1950)
- Zenocolaspis subtropica (Schaeffer, 1906)
