= Hystiopsis irritans =

Scientific classification
- Kingdom: Animalia
- Phylum: Arthropoda
- Clade: Pancrustacea
- Class: Insecta
- Order: Coleoptera
- Suborder: Polyphaga
- Infraorder: Cucujiformia
- Family: Chrysomelidae
- Genus: Hystiopsis
- Species: H. irritans

Binomial name
- Hystiopsis irritans Blake, 1966

Species of beetle

Hystiopsis irritans is a species of beetle of the family Chrysomelidae. It is found in Bolivia.

== Description ==
Adults reach a length of about 5.5 mm. The pronotum has a dark median vitta and the elytron is dark with a large pale median spot.
