= Colaspis suggona =

Scientific classification
- Kingdom: Animalia
- Phylum: Arthropoda
- Clade: Pancrustacea
- Class: Insecta
- Order: Coleoptera
- Suborder: Polyphaga
- Infraorder: Cucujiformia
- Family: Chrysomelidae
- Genus: Colaspis
- Species: C. suggona

Binomial name
- Colaspis suggona Blake, 1977

Species of beetle

Colaspis suggona is a species of leaf beetle. It is found in North America.
