= Hystiopsis mapirii =

Scientific classification
- Kingdom: Animalia
- Phylum: Arthropoda
- Clade: Pancrustacea
- Class: Insecta
- Order: Coleoptera
- Suborder: Polyphaga
- Infraorder: Cucujiformia
- Family: Chrysomelidae
- Genus: Hystiopsis
- Species: H. mapirii

Binomial name
- Hystiopsis mapirii Blake, 1966

Species of beetle

Hystiopsis mapirii is a species of beetle of the family Chrysomelidae. It is found in Bolivia.

== Description ==
Adults reach a length of about 5 mm. Adults are pale yellow, while the head is mostly piceous. The elytron has a short reddish brown vitta and a spot at the apical curve.
