= Hystiopsis terminalis =

Scientific classification
- Kingdom: Animalia
- Phylum: Arthropoda
- Clade: Pancrustacea
- Class: Insecta
- Order: Coleoptera
- Suborder: Polyphaga
- Infraorder: Cucujiformia
- Family: Chrysomelidae
- Genus: Hystiopsis
- Species: H. terminalis

Binomial name
- Hystiopsis terminalis Blake, 1966

Species of beetle

Hystiopsis terminalis is a species of beetle of the family Chrysomelidae. It is found in Brazil.

== Description ==
Adults reach a length of about 6 mm. Adults are pale yellowish brown. The elytron has dark piceous vittae along the side and suture, and a dark apical marking.
