= Colaspis cruriflava =

Scientific classification
- Kingdom: Animalia
- Phylum: Arthropoda
- Clade: Pancrustacea
- Class: Insecta
- Order: Coleoptera
- Suborder: Polyphaga
- Infraorder: Cucujiformia
- Family: Chrysomelidae
- Genus: Colaspis
- Species: C. cruriflava

Binomial name
- Colaspis cruriflava Blake, 1977

Species of beetle

Colaspis cruriflava is a species of leaf beetle found in the state of Arizona in the United States. It was first described by the American entomologist Doris Holmes Blake in 1977. The specific name, cruriflava, is derived from the Latin for "leg yellow".
