= Hystiopsis =

Scientific classification
- Kingdom: Animalia
- Phylum: Arthropoda
- Clade: Pancrustacea
- Class: Insecta
- Order: Coleoptera
- Suborder: Polyphaga
- Infraorder: Cucujiformia
- Family: Chrysomelidae
- Tribe: Luperini
- Subtribe: Diabroticina
- Genus: Hystiopsis; Blake, 1966

Genus of leaf beetles

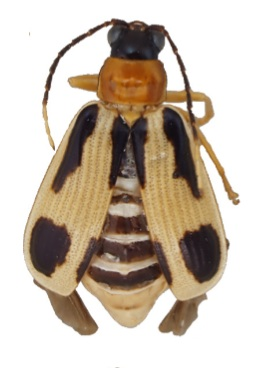
Hystiopsis beniensis

Hystiopsis is a genus of beetles belonging to the family Chrysomelidae.

== Species ==
- Hystiopsis bella Blake, 1966
- Hystiopsis beniensis Blake, 1966
- Hystiopsis bryanti Blake, 1966
- Hystiopsis egleri (Bechyne & Bechyne, 1965)
- Hystiopsis exarata Blake, 1966
- Hystiopsis flavipes Blake, 1966
- Hystiopsis grossa Blake, 1966
- Hystiopsis irritans Blake, 1966
- Hystiopsis maculata Blake, 1966
- Hystiopsis mansei Blake, 1966
- Hystiopsis mapirii Blake, 1966
- Hystiopsis marginalis (Fabricius, 1801)
- Hystiopsis maxima Blake, 1966
- Hystiopsis megala Blake, 1966
- Hystiopsis nigriventris Blake, 1966
- Hystiopsis peruensis Blake, 1966
- Hystiopsis phaica Blake, 1966
- Hystiopsis terminalis Blake, 1966
- Hystiopsis zonata Blake, 1966
