= Hystiopsis zonata =

Scientific classification
- Kingdom: Animalia
- Phylum: Arthropoda
- Clade: Pancrustacea
- Class: Insecta
- Order: Coleoptera
- Suborder: Polyphaga
- Infraorder: Cucujiformia
- Family: Chrysomelidae
- Genus: Hystiopsis
- Species: H. zonata

Binomial name
- Hystiopsis zonata Blake, 1966

Species of beetle

Hystiopsis zonata is a species of beetle of the family Chrysomelidae. It is found in Peru.

== Description ==
Adults reach a length of about 6 mm. Adults are pale yellow, while the elytron is piceous with a pale margin and a pale transverse fascia.
