= Potamobrotica =

Scientific classification
- Kingdom: Animalia
- Phylum: Arthropoda
- Clade: Pancrustacea
- Class: Insecta
- Order: Coleoptera
- Suborder: Polyphaga
- Infraorder: Cucujiformia
- Family: Chrysomelidae
- Tribe: Luperini
- Subtribe: Diabroticina
- Genus: Potamobrotica; Blake, 1966

Genus of leaf beetles

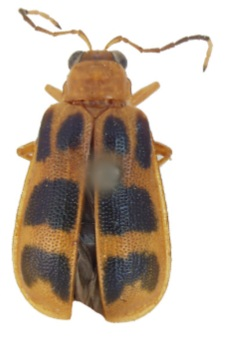
Potamobrotica trifasciata

Potamobrotica is a genus of beetles belonging to the family Chrysomelidae.

== Species ==
- Potamobrotica brasiliensis (Bowditch, 1913)
- Potamobrotica trifasciata (Blake, 1966)
- Potamobrotica viridis (Blake, 1966)
