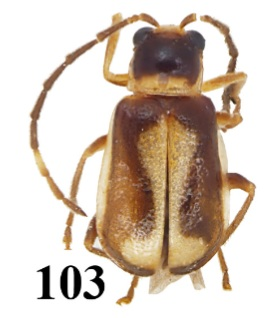

Scientific classification
- Kingdom: Animalia
- Phylum: Arthropoda
- Clade: Pancrustacea
- Class: Insecta
- Order: Coleoptera
- Suborder: Polyphaga
- Infraorder: Cucujiformia
- Family: Chrysomelidae
- Genus: Porechontes
- Species: P. wilcoxi

Binomial name
- Porechontes wilcoxi Blake, 1966

= Porechontes wilcoxi =

Species of beetle

Porechontes wilcoxi is a species of beetle of the family Chrysomelidae. It is found in the Neotropical Region.
