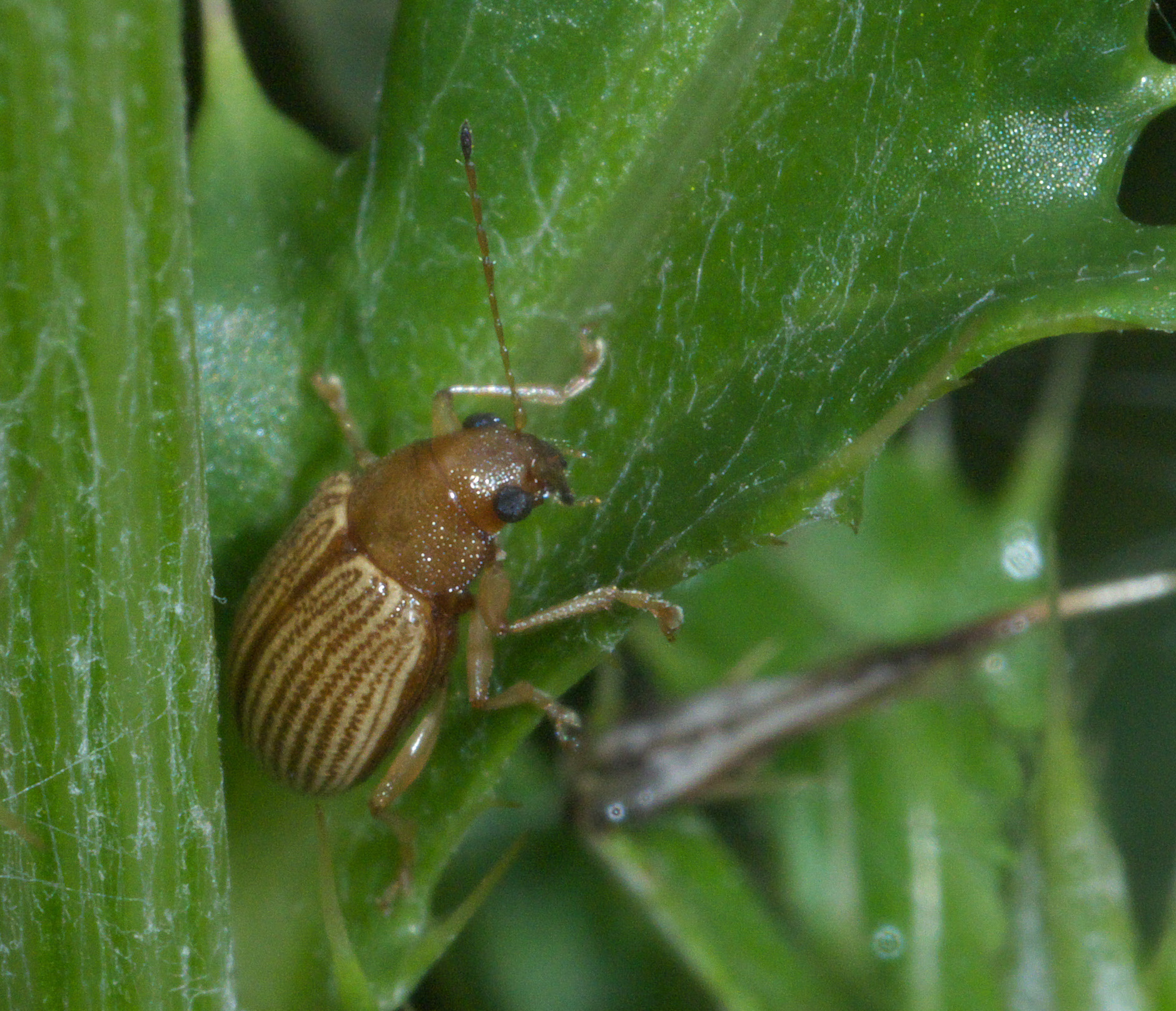
- Colaspis brunnea

Scientific classification
- Kingdom: Animalia
- Phylum: Arthropoda
- Clade: Pancrustacea
- Class: Insecta
- Order: Coleoptera
- Suborder: Polyphaga
- Infraorder: Cucujiformia
- Family: Chrysomelidae
- Subfamily: Eumolpinae
- Tribe: Eumolpini
- Genus: Colaspis; Fabricius, 1801

Type species
- Chrysomela flavicornis Fabricius, 1787

Species
- See text

Synonyms
- Maecolaspis Bechyné, 1950

= Colaspis =

Colaspis Temporal range: 37.2–0 Ma

Genus of leaf beetles

Colaspis is a genus of leaf beetles in the subfamily Eumolpinae. It is one of the largest genera in the subfamily, containing over 200 species, and it is known from both North and South America. A number of species from this genus are considered to be pests, such as the grape colaspis (Colaspis brunnea). Some species are known from the fossil record from the Eocene of Colorado in the United States.

== Taxonomy ==
In some publications for the Neotropical realm, Colaspis is also known as Maecolaspis. This alternative name was created by the Czech entomologist Jan Bechyné in 1950, due to an error relating to the type species of Colaspis: Bechyné incorrectly considered Colaspis testacea to be the type species of Colaspis, rather than Chrysomela flavicornis. As a result, Metaxyonycha, which shared the same type species, was synonymised with Colaspis. The species of Colaspis listed in the Coleopterorum Catalogus (a beetle catalog edited by Wilhelm Junk and Sigmund Schenkling) were then placed under Bechyné's new name, "Maecolaspis", with Chrysomela flavicornis as the type species. These errors were corrected by W. J. Brown in 1961, who synonymized Maecolaspis with Colaspis. Despite this, Bechyné continued to use Maecolaspis as valid, while Doris Holmes Blake published several papers on Colaspis without mentioning Bechyné's Maecolaspis. This effectively created two systems for the taxonomy of the Neotropical leaf beetles, which has frequently confused those studying the Neotropical Eumolpinae.

Many species originally placed in Colaspis were split by Bechyné into several smaller genera, such as Allocolaspis, Callicolaspis, Percolaspis, Nodocolaspis and Zenocolaspis. The genus requires further subdivision.

== Species ==
These extant species belong to the genus Colaspis (= Maecolaspis):

- Colaspis abdominalis Lefèvre, 1877
- Colaspis aberrans (Bechyné, 1953)
- Colaspis achardi Bechyné, 1949
  - Colaspis achardi achardi Bechyné, 1949
  - Colaspis achardi pseudoachardi (Bechyné, 1950)
- Colaspis adducta Clavareau, 1914
- Colaspis adusta Lefèvre, 1885
- Colaspis aenea Fabricius, 1801
- Colaspis aeneicollis Bowditch, 1921
- Colaspis aeneola Weise, 1921^{g}
  - Colaspis aeneola aeneola Weise, 1921
  - Colaspis aeneola barticensis (Bechyné, 1951)
- Colaspis aerea Lefèvre, 1884^{g}
  - Colaspis aerea aerea Lefèvre, 1884
  - Colaspis aerea odetta (Bechyné, 1953)
- Colaspis aeruginosa (Germar, 1824)
  - Colaspis aeruginosa aeruginosa (Germar, 1824)
  - Colaspis aeruginosa tenuesculpta (Bechyné, 1950)
- Colaspis affinis Weise, 1921
- Colaspis alcyonea Suffrian, 1866
- Colaspis amabilis Jacoby, 1900
- Colaspis amazonae Jacoby, 1900
- Colaspis amplicollis Blake, 1971
- Colaspis anceps Lefèvre, 1878
- Colaspis ansa Riley, 2020
- Colaspis apurensis (Bechyné, 1951)
- Colaspis araguensis (Bechyné, 1958)
- Colaspis arizonensis Schaeffer, 1933^{i c g b}
- Colaspis assimilis Klug, 1829
- Colaspis balyi Jacoby, 1881
- Colaspis barberi Blake, 1967
- Colaspis basipennis Bowditch, 1921
- Colaspis batesi Jacoby, 1900
- Colaspis bicolor Germar, 1824
- Colaspis bidenticollis Bowditch, 1921
- Colaspis blakeae Ostmark, 1975
- Colaspis bohumilae (Bechyné, 1950)
- Colaspis braxatibiae Blake, 1978
- Colaspis bridarollii Bechyné, 1949
- Colaspis brownsvillensis Blake, 1976^{i c g b} (Brownsville milkvine leaf beetle)
- Colaspis brunnea (Fabricius, 1798)^{i c g b} (grape colaspis)
- Colaspis brunneipennis Bowditch, 1921
- Colaspis buckleyi (Bechyné, 1953)
  - Colaspis buckleyi buckleyi (Bechyné, 1953)
  - Colaspis buckleyi incomparabilis (Bechyné, 1950)
- Colaspis calcarifera (Bechyné, 1954)
- Colaspis caligula Agrain, Cabrera, Holgado & Vicchi, 2016
- Colaspis callichloris Lefèvre, 1878
- Colaspis carolinensis Blake, 1974^{i c g}
- Colaspis castanea Boheman, 1858
- Colaspis championi Jacoby, 1881^{i c g}
- Colaspis chapalensis Blake, 1976
- Colaspis chapuisi Jacoby, 1884
- Colaspis chlorana Lefèvre, 1891
- Colaspis chlorites Erichson, 1847
- Colaspis chloropsis Blake, 1976
- Colaspis coelestina Erichson, 1847
- Colaspis concolor Bowditch, 1921^{g}
- Colaspis confusa Bowditch, 1921
- Colaspis corrugata Lefèvre, 1885
- Colaspis corumbensis Blake, 1978
- Colaspis costipennis Crotch, 1873^{i c g b}
- Colaspis cribellata Lefèvre, 1888
- Colaspis cribricollis Lefèvre, 1884
  - Colaspis cribricollis cribricollis Lefèvre, 1884
  - Colaspis cribricollis machacalisa (Bechyné, 1958)
- Colaspis crinicornis Schaeffer, 1933^{i c g b}
- Colaspis cruriflava Blake, 1977^{i c g b}
- Colaspis cubensis Blake, 1967
- Colaspis darlingtoni Blake, 1967
- Colaspis dejeani Lefèvre, 1884^{g}
- Colaspis deleta Suffrian, 1867
- Colaspis delphina (Bechyné, 1951)
- Colaspis demersa (Bechyné, 1950)
- Colaspis dentifera (Bechyné, 1951)
- Colaspis dentipyga (Bechyné, 1958)
- Colaspis diduma Blake, 1976
- Colaspis dilatipes Bowditch, 1921
- Colaspis dionysea Bechyné, 1949
- Colaspis discolor Weise, 1921
- Colaspis dispar Bowditch, 1921
- Colaspis diversa Lefèvre, 1878
- Colaspis dugesi Lefèvre, 1885
- Colaspis ekraspedona Blake, 1978
- Colaspis exarata Lefèvre, 1884
- Colaspis farri Blake, 1967
- Colaspis favosa Say, 1824^{i c g b}
- Colaspis femoralis Olivier, 1808
- Colaspis fervida (Suffrian, 1866)
- Colaspis flavantenna Blake, 1978
- Colaspis flavicornis (Fabricius, 1787)
  - Colaspis flavicornis flavicornis (Fabricius, 1787)
  - Colaspis flavicornis pedator (Bechyné, 1950)
  - Colaspis flavicornis urbana (Bechyné, 1950)
- Colaspis flavipes Olivier, 1808
- Colaspis flavocostata Schaeffer, 1933^{i c g b}
- Colaspis floridana Schaeffer, 1933^{i c g}
- Colaspis foersteri (Bechyné, 1958)
- Colaspis foveicollis Jacoby, 1880
- Colaspis freyi Bechyné, 1950
  - Colaspis freyi adscripta (Bechyné, 1953)
  - Colaspis freyi freyi Bechyné, 1950
- Colaspis fulvilabris Jacoby, 1880
- Colaspis fulvotestacea Lefèvre, 1878
- Colaspis fuscipes Bowditch, 1921
- Colaspis gemellata Lefèvre, 1885
- Colaspis geminata Boheman, 1858
- Colaspis gemmingeri Harold, 1874
  - Colaspis gemmingeri chaparensis (Bechyné, 1951)
  - Colaspis gemmingeri gemmingeri Harold, 1874
- Colaspis gemmula Erichson, 1847
- Colaspis geniculata Lefèvre, 1891
- Colaspis goyazensis Bowditch, 1921
- Colaspis guatemalensis Blake, 1976
- Colaspis gwendolina (Bechyné, 1953)
- Colaspis hesperia Blake, 1974^{i c g b}
- Colaspis hirticornis (Bechyné, 1955)
- Colaspis hypochlora Lefèvre, 1878
  - Colaspis hypochlora anteposita (Bechyné, 1950)
  - Colaspis hypochlora hypochlora Lefèvre, 1878
- Colaspis impressipennis Bowditch, 1921
- Colaspis inconspicua Jacoby, 1890
- Colaspis interstitialis Lefèvre, 1877
- Colaspis intricata Lefèvre, 1888
- Colaspis jalapae (Bechyné, 1950)
- Colaspis jansoni Jacoby, 1881
- Colaspis janssensi (Bechyné, 1950)
- Colaspis jocosa Bowditch, 1921
- Colaspis joliveti (Bechyné, 1950)
- Colaspis juxaoculus Blake, 1978
- Colaspis kaszabi (Bechyné, 1953)
- Colaspis keyensis Blake, 1974^{i c g}
- Colaspis kirra Blake, 1976
- Colaspis klagii Bowditch, 1921
- Colaspis labilis (Bechyné, 1953)
- Colaspis lampomela Blake, 1978
- Colaspis laplatensis Bechyné, 1949
- Colaspis laeta Germar, 1821
- Colaspis lata Schaeffer, 1933^{i c g}
- Colaspis lauei (Bechyné, 1950)
- Colaspis lebasi Lefèvre, 1878
  - Colaspis lebasi falconensis (Bechyné, 1997)
  - Colaspis lebasi gwendolina (Bechyné, 1953)
  - Colaspis lebasi lebasi Lefèvre, 1878
  - Colaspis lebasi praecipitata (Bechyné, 1997)
  - Colaspis lebasi ruderalis (Bechyné, 1997)
- Colaspis lebasiformis (Bechyné, 1953)
- Colaspis lebasoides Bowditch, 1921
- Colaspis legionalis (Bechyné, 1953)^{g}
  - Colaspis legionalis bubonica (Bechyné, 1997)
  - Colaspis legionalis dispersa (Bechyné, 1997)
  - Colaspis legionalis legionalis (Bechyné, 1953)
- Colaspis leopoldina (Bechyné, 1954)
- Colaspis leucopus Harold, 1875
- Colaspis levicostata Blake, 1976
- Colaspis libatrix (Bechyné, 1953)
- Colaspis longipennis Blake, 1976
- Colaspis lophodes Blake, 1974
- Colaspis louisianae Blake, 1974^{i c g b}
- Colaspis luciae Blake, 1967
- Colaspis luridula Lefèvre, 1878
- Colaspis luteicornis (Fabricius, 1792)
- Colaspis macroptera Blake, 1976
- Colaspis maida (Bechyné, 1954)
- Colaspis manausa Blake, 1978
- Colaspis melaina Blake, 1974^{i c g}
- Colaspis melancholica Jacoby, 1881
- Colaspis meriamae (Bechyné, 1951)
- Colaspis metallica Lefèvre, 1891^{g}
- Colaspis mexicana Jacoby, 1881
- Colaspis micans Weise, 1921
- Colaspis missionea Bechyné, 1949
- Colaspis mixticolor (Bechyné, 1951)
- Colaspis moesta Horn, 1895
- Colaspis monomorpha (Bechyné, 1950)
- Colaspis monrosi (Bechyné, 1950)
- Colaspis montana Jacoby, 1891
- Colaspis musae Bechyné, 1950^{g}
- Colaspis nigricornis Fabricius, 1801
- Colaspis nigripennis Jacoby, 1880
- Colaspis nigrocyanea Crotch, 1873^{i c g b}
- Colaspis obliqua Bowditch, 1921
- Colaspis obscura Fabricius, 1801
- Colaspis occidentalis (Linnaeus, 1758)^{g}
- Colaspis orientalis Blake, 1967
- Colaspis otileensis Bowditch, 1921
- Colaspis pallipes Lefèvre, 1877
- Colaspis pantaria (Bechyné, 1951)
  - Colaspis pantaria emarginator (Bechyné, 1951)
  - Colaspis pantaria guayanensis (Bechyné, 1997)
  - Colaspis pantaria pantaria (Bechyné, 1951)
  - Colaspis pantaria vaticina (Bechyné, 1997)
- Colaspis panzoensis (Bechyné, 1951)
- Colaspis paracostata Blake, 1978
- Colaspis perfidia (Bechyné, 1954)
- Colaspis perichrysea (Bechyné, 1951)
- Colaspis perturbata Weise, 1921^{g}
  - Colaspis perturbata antanossa (Bechyné, 1950)
  - Colaspis perturbata coloresignata (Bechyné, 1951)
  - Colaspis perturbata ostrina (Bechyné, 1950)
  - Colaspis perturbata perturbata Weise, 1921
  - Colaspis perturbata phylis (Bechyné, 1953)
- Colaspis pini Barber, 1937^{i c g b} (pine colaspis)
- Colaspis planicostata Blake, 1974^{i c g b}
- Colaspis pleuralis Weise, 1921
- Colaspis plicatula Jacoby, 1882
- Colaspis pohli (Bechyné, 1955)
  - Colaspis pohli major (Bechyné, 1958)
  - Colaspis pohli pohli (Bechyné, 1955)
- Colaspis propinqua Lefèvre, 1885
- Colaspis prospectans (Bechyné, 1958)
- Colaspis proteus Bechyné, 1949
- Colaspis pseudofavosa E. Riley, 1978^{i c g b}
- Colaspis pseudogeminata (Bechyné, 1950)
- Colaspis pseudopruinosa Bechyné, 1949
- Colaspis pubiceps (Bechyné, 1952)
- Colaspis punctigera Weise, 1921
- Colaspis punctipennis Bowditch, 1921
- Colaspis purpurala Blake, 1978
- Colaspis purpurea Blake, 1971
- Colaspis quattuordecimcostata Lefèvre, 1877
- Colaspis recurva Blake, 1974^{i c g b}
- Colaspis reflexomicans (Bechyné, 1953)
- Colaspis romani Weise, 1921
- Colaspis rufipes Jacoby, 1900
- Colaspis rugifera Weise, 1921
- Colaspis rugulosa Lefèvre, 1891
- Colaspis rustica Boheman, 1859
  - Colaspis rustica distortella (Bechyné, 1952)
  - Colaspis rustica rustica Boheman, 1859
  - Colaspis rustica santoamarensis (Bechyné, 1950)
  - Colaspis rustica thoracophora (Bechyné, 1952)
- Colaspis sanguinea Blake, 1977^{i c g}
- Colaspis sanjoseana (Bechyné, 1950)
- Colaspis scintillifera Bechyné, 1949
  - Colaspis scintillifera ascintillans (Bechyné, 1950)
  - Colaspis scintillifera scintillifera Bechyné, 1949
- Colaspis shuteae Blake, 1976
- Colaspis similaris Blake, 1976
- Colaspis similis Blake, 1977^{i c g}
- Colaspis simplex Weise, 1921
- Colaspis simplicipes Bechyné, 1950
- Colaspis skelleyi Riley, 2020
- Colaspis smaragdula Olivier, 1808
- Colaspis soror Weise, 1921
- Colaspis speciosa Lefèvre, 1885
- Colaspis spinigera Blake, 1976
- Colaspis stenorachis Blake, 1976
- Colaspis strigata Lefèvre, 1878
- Colaspis subacuta (Bechyné, 1950)
- Colaspis submersa Bechyné, 1949
- Colaspis suffriani Weise, 1914
- Colaspis suggona Blake, 1977^{i c g b}
- Colaspis suilla Fabricius, 1801^{i c g b}
- Colaspis sulphuripes Lefèvre, 1877
  - Colaspis sulphuripes matura (Bechyné, 1951)
  - Colaspis sulphuripes sulphuripes Lefèvre, 1877
- Colaspis surrubrensis (Bechyné, 1950)
- Colaspis tabacilla (Bechyné, 1951)
  - Colaspis tabacilla berriensis (Bechyné, 1951)
  - Colaspis tabacilla puertocabellensis (Bechyné, 1953)
  - Colaspis tabacilla sedula (Bechyné, 1951)
  - Colaspis tabacilla tabacilla (Bechyné, 1951)
- Colaspis taylori Bechyné, 1949
- Colaspis thomasi Riley, 2020
- Colaspis tibialis Lefèvre, 1885
- Colaspis townsendi Bowditch, 1921
- Colaspis trichopyga (Bechyné, 1954)
  - Colaspis trichopyga gravida (Bechyné, 1955)
  - Colaspis trichopyga trichopyga (Bechyné, 1954)
- Colaspis tucumanensis Bowditch, 1921
- Colaspis unicolor Olivier, 1808
- Colaspis utinga (Bechyné & Bechyné, 1961)
- Colaspis variabilis Blake, 1976
- Colaspis vieta (Bechyné, 1950)
- Colaspis violetta Bechyné, 1949
- Colaspis viridiceps Schaeffer, 1933^{i c g b}
- Colaspis viridicollis Bowditch, 1921
- Colaspis viridipunctata Jacoby, 1900
- Colaspis viridissima Lefèvre, 1877
- Colaspis viriditincta Schaeffer, 1919^{i c g b}
- Colaspis virulenta (Bechyné, 1953)
- Colaspis willincki (Bechyné, 1950)
- Colaspis yucatana Jacoby, 1890
- Colaspis yungarum (Bechyné, 1951)
- Colaspis zanthophaia Blake, 1976
- Colaspis zilchi (Bechyné, 1954)
- Colaspis zischkai (Bechyné, 1951)

These four extinct species belong to the genus Colaspis:

- †Colaspis aetatis Wickham, 1911
- †Colaspis diluvialis Wickham, 1914
- †Colaspis luti Scudder, 1900
- †Colaspis proserpina Wickham, 1914

Synonyms:

- Colaspis aemula Weise, 1921: synonym of Colaspis flavipes Olivier, 1808
- Colaspis cartwrighti Blake, 1977: synonym of Tymnes tricolor (Fabricius, 1792)
- Colaspis coneja Kolbe, 1901: synonym of Nodocolaspis columbica (Jacoby, 1900)
- Colaspis costipennis Lefèvre, 1877: renamed to Colaspis lophodes Blake, 1974
- Colaspis elegans Jacoby, 1900: synonym of Nodocolaspis costipennis (Lefèvre, 1877)
- Colaspis flavipes (Fabricius, 1781): synonym of Colaspis occidentalis (Linnaeus, 1758)
- Colaspis pectoralis Lefèvre, 1885: synonym of Coytiera (Campylochira) zikani Bechyné, 1950
- Colaspis prasina Lefèvre, 1878: synonym of Colaspis flavicornis (Fabricius, 1787)

Data sources: i = ITIS, c = Catalogue of Life, g = GBIF, b = Bugguide.net
