= Hystiopsis maxima =

Scientific classification
- Kingdom: Animalia
- Phylum: Arthropoda
- Clade: Pancrustacea
- Class: Insecta
- Order: Coleoptera
- Suborder: Polyphaga
- Infraorder: Cucujiformia
- Family: Chrysomelidae
- Genus: Hystiopsis
- Species: H. maxima

Binomial name
- Hystiopsis maxima Blake, 1966

Species of beetle

Hystiopsis maxima is a species of beetle of the family Chrysomelidae. It is found in Colombia.

== Description ==
Adults reach a length of about 9 mm. Adults are pale yellow brown with a piceous head. The elytron has a metallic blue green lateral vitta and a shorter sutural vitta.
