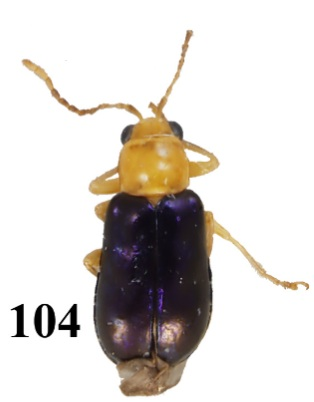
- Ectmesopus darlingtoni

Scientific classification
- Kingdom: Animalia
- Phylum: Arthropoda
- Clade: Pancrustacea
- Class: Insecta
- Order: Coleoptera
- Suborder: Polyphaga
- Infraorder: Cucujiformia
- Family: Chrysomelidae
- Tribe: Luperini
- Subtribe: Diabroticina
- Genus: Ectmesopus; Blake, 1940

= Ectmesopus =

Genus of leaf beetles

Ectmesopus is a genus of beetles belonging to the family Chrysomelidae.

== Species ==
- Ectmesopus angusticollis Blake, 1940
- Ectmesopus crassicornis Blake, 1940
- Ectmesopus darlingtoni Blake, 1940
- Ectmesopus leonadorum Blake, 1958
- Ectmesopus longicornis Blake, 1940
- Ectmesopus malachioides (Suffrian, 1867)
- Ectmesopus nigrolimbatus (Blake, 1959)
- Ectmesopus occipitalis (Blake, 1940)
- Ectmesopus pallidus (Blake, 1940)
- Ectmesopus placidus (Suffrian, 1867)
- Ectmesopus rhabdotus (Blake, 1966)
- Ectmesopus tristis (Blake, 1940)
- Ectmesopus vitticollis (Blake, 1940)
- Ectmesopus zayasi (Blake, 1959)
- Ectmesopus zonatus (Blake, 1940)
