= Hystiopsis phaica =

Scientific classification
- Kingdom: Animalia
- Phylum: Arthropoda
- Clade: Pancrustacea
- Class: Insecta
- Order: Coleoptera
- Suborder: Polyphaga
- Infraorder: Cucujiformia
- Family: Chrysomelidae
- Genus: Hystiopsis
- Species: H. phaica

Binomial name
- Hystiopsis phaica Blake, 1966

Species of beetle

Hystiopsis phaica is a species of beetle of the family Chrysomelidae. It is found in Ecuador.

== Description ==
Adults reach a length of about 7.5 mm. Adults are pale yellowish brown with a piceous head. The elytron has a dark spot and two round pale spots.
