= Hystiopsis bella =

Scientific classification
- Kingdom: Animalia
- Phylum: Arthropoda
- Clade: Pancrustacea
- Class: Insecta
- Order: Coleoptera
- Suborder: Polyphaga
- Infraorder: Cucujiformia
- Family: Chrysomelidae
- Genus: Hystiopsis
- Species: H. bella

Binomial name
- Hystiopsis bella Blake, 1966

Species of beetle

Hystiopsis bella is a species of beetle of the family Chrysomelidae. It is found in Bolivia.

== Description ==
Adults reach a length of about 5.5 mm. Adults are pale yellow, the elytron with a pale margin, a pale basal spot and a pale fascia.
