= Colaspis viriditincta =

Scientific classification
- Kingdom: Animalia
- Phylum: Arthropoda
- Clade: Pancrustacea
- Class: Insecta
- Order: Coleoptera
- Suborder: Polyphaga
- Infraorder: Cucujiformia
- Family: Chrysomelidae
- Genus: Colaspis
- Species: C. viriditincta

Binomial name
- Colaspis viriditincta Schaeffer, 1919

Synonyms
- Colaspis brunnea var. viriditincta Schaeffer, 1919

Species of beetle

Colaspis viriditincta is a species of leaf beetle from North America. It is distributed in Arizona and Mexico. It was first described by the American entomologist Charles Frederic August Schaeffer in 1919. The specific name, viriditincta, is derived from the Latin for "green-tinged".
