= Hystiopsis flavipes =

Scientific classification
- Kingdom: Animalia
- Phylum: Arthropoda
- Clade: Pancrustacea
- Class: Insecta
- Order: Coleoptera
- Suborder: Polyphaga
- Infraorder: Cucujiformia
- Family: Chrysomelidae
- Genus: Hystiopsis
- Species: H. flavipes

Binomial name
- Hystiopsis flavipes Blake, 1966

Species of beetle

Hystiopsis flavipes is a species of beetle of the family Chrysomelidae. It is found in Venezuela and Brazil.

== Description ==
Adults reach a length of about 6.5–7.5 mm. Adults are pale yellow brown with a piceous head. The elytron has a piceous making across the base and two large piceous spots.
