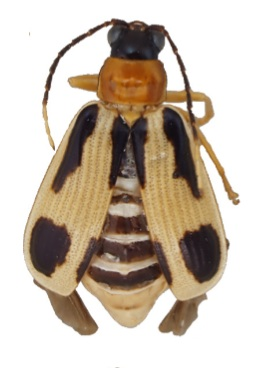

Scientific classification
- Kingdom: Animalia
- Phylum: Arthropoda
- Clade: Pancrustacea
- Class: Insecta
- Order: Coleoptera
- Suborder: Polyphaga
- Infraorder: Cucujiformia
- Family: Chrysomelidae
- Genus: Hystiopsis
- Species: H. beniensis

Binomial name
- Hystiopsis beniensis Blake, 1966

= Hystiopsis beniensis =

Species of beetle

Hystiopsis beniensis is a species of beetle of the family Chrysomelidae. It is found in Bolivia and Argentina.

== Description ==
Adults reach a length of about 5.5–7.5 mm. Adults are pale yellow brown, while the head is piceous. The elytron has a piceous lateral vitta, a short sutural vitta and a large spot.
