= Colaspis flavocostata =

Scientific classification
- Kingdom: Animalia
- Phylum: Arthropoda
- Clade: Pancrustacea
- Class: Insecta
- Order: Coleoptera
- Suborder: Polyphaga
- Infraorder: Cucujiformia
- Family: Chrysomelidae
- Genus: Colaspis
- Species: C. flavocostata

Binomial name
- Colaspis flavocostata Schaeffer, 1933

Species of beetle

Colaspis flavocostata is a species of leaf beetle from North America. It is found in the coastal states of the United States; its range spans from Mississippi to Florida and to South Carolina. It was first described by the American entomologist Charles Frederic August Schaeffer in 1933.

== Subspecies ==
These two subspecies belong to the species Colaspis flavocostata:

- Colaspis flavocostata avaloni Blake, 1974^{i c g}
- Colaspis flavocostata flavocostata Schaeffer, 1933^{i c g}

Data sources: i = ITIS, c = Catalogue of Life, g = GBIF, b = Bugguide.net
