= Hystiopsis megala =

Scientific classification
- Kingdom: Animalia
- Phylum: Arthropoda
- Clade: Pancrustacea
- Class: Insecta
- Order: Coleoptera
- Suborder: Polyphaga
- Infraorder: Cucujiformia
- Family: Chrysomelidae
- Genus: Hystiopsis
- Species: H. megala

Binomial name
- Hystiopsis megala Blake, 1966

Species of beetle

Hystiopsis megala is a species of beetle of the family Chrysomelidae. It is found in Ecuador.

== Description ==
Adults reach a length of about 8–9 mm. Adults are pale yellow brown with a mostly piceous head. The elytron has two dark vittae, and sometimes a median spot and larger apical spot.
