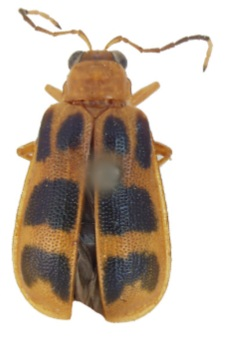

Scientific classification
- Kingdom: Animalia
- Phylum: Arthropoda
- Clade: Pancrustacea
- Class: Insecta
- Order: Coleoptera
- Suborder: Polyphaga
- Infraorder: Cucujiformia
- Family: Chrysomelidae
- Genus: Potamobrotica
- Species: P. trifasciata

Binomial name
- Potamobrotica trifasciata Blake, 1966

= Potamobrotica trifasciata =

Species of beetle

Potamobrotica trifasciata is a species of beetle of the family Chrysomelidae. It is found in Venezuela and Brazil.

== Description ==
Adults reach a length of about 7–8 mm. Adults are pale reddish or yellowish with brown markings on the head and three brown spots on the elytra.
