= Porechontes =

Scientific classification
- Kingdom: Animalia
- Phylum: Arthropoda
- Clade: Pancrustacea
- Class: Insecta
- Order: Coleoptera
- Suborder: Polyphaga
- Infraorder: Cucujiformia
- Family: Chrysomelidae
- Tribe: Luperini
- Subtribe: Diabroticina
- Genus: Porechontes; Blake, 1966

Genus of leaf beetles

Porechontes is a genus of beetles belonging to the family Chrysomelidae.

== Species ==
- Porechontes albiventris (Blake, 1958)
- Porechontes limbella (Weise, 1921)
- Porechontes wilcoxi Blake, 1966
