= Taphrocerus laevicollis =

Scientific classification
- Kingdom: Animalia
- Phylum: Arthropoda
- Class: Insecta
- Order: Coleoptera
- Suborder: Polyphaga
- Infraorder: Elateriformia
- Family: Buprestidae
- Subfamily: Agrilinae
- Tribe: Tracheini
- Subtribe: Brachyina
- Genus: Taphrocerus
- Species: T. laevicollis

Binomial name
- Taphrocerus laevicollis LeConte, 1878

Species of beetle

Taphrocerus laevicollis is a species of metallic wood-boring beetle in the family Buprestidae. It is found in North America.
