= Taphrocerus nicolayi =

Scientific classification
- Domain: Eukaryota
- Kingdom: Animalia
- Phylum: Arthropoda
- Class: Insecta
- Order: Coleoptera
- Suborder: Polyphaga
- Infraorder: Elateriformia
- Family: Buprestidae
- Subfamily: Agrilinae
- Tribe: Trachyini
- Subtribe: Brachyina
- Genus: Taphrocerus
- Species: T. nicolayi

Binomial name
- Taphrocerus nicolayi Obenberger, 1924

Species of beetle

Taphrocerus nicolayi is a species of metallic wood-boring beetle in the family Buprestidae. It is found in North America.
