= Taphrocerus cylindricollis =

Scientific classification
- Kingdom: Animalia
- Phylum: Arthropoda
- Class: Insecta
- Order: Coleoptera
- Suborder: Polyphaga
- Infraorder: Elateriformia
- Family: Buprestidae
- Subfamily: Agrilinae
- Tribe: Trachyini
- Subtribe: Brachyina
- Genus: Taphrocerus
- Species: T. cylindricollis

Binomial name
- Taphrocerus cylindricollis Kerremans, 1896

Synonyms
- Taphrocerus albonotatus Blatchley, 1919

Species of beetle

Taphrocerus cylindricollis is a species of metallic wood-boring beetle in the family Buprestidae. It is found in North America.
