= Nesaecrepida asphaltina =

Scientific classification
- Kingdom: Animalia
- Phylum: Arthropoda
- Class: Insecta
- Order: Coleoptera
- Suborder: Polyphaga
- Infraorder: Cucujiformia
- Family: Chrysomelidae
- Tribe: Alticini
- Genus: Nesaecrepida
- Species: N. asphaltina

Binomial name
- Nesaecrepida asphaltina (Suffrian, 1868)

Species of beetle

Nesaecrepida asphaltina is a species of flea beetle in the family Chrysomelidae. It is found in the Caribbean Sea, Central America, and North America.
