= Colaspis bridarollii =

Scientific classification
- Kingdom: Animalia
- Phylum: Arthropoda
- Clade: Pancrustacea
- Class: Insecta
- Order: Coleoptera
- Suborder: Polyphaga
- Infraorder: Cucujiformia
- Family: Chrysomelidae
- Genus: Colaspis
- Species: C. bridarollii

Binomial name
- Colaspis bridarollii Bechyné, 1949

Synonyms
- Colaspis bridarolliii ab. aurichalcea Bechyné, 1949; Maecolaspis bridarollii (Bechyné, 1949)

Species of beetle

Colaspis bridarollii is a species of leaf beetle from South America. It was first described by the Czech entomologist Jan Bechyné in 1949, and was dedicated to the Argentine Jesuit entomologist Albino Juan Bridarolli. It is one of the main pests of potatoes in Buenos Aires Province, Argentina; it was first reported attacking potatoes in the region in 1997.

== Distribution ==
In Argentina, C. bridarollii is recorded from Santiago del Estero, Buenos Aires, Córdoba, Entre Ríos, Misiones, Santa Fe and Chaco. It is also recorded from Paraguay, Uruguay and Brazil.
