= Hystiopsis marginalis =

Scientific classification
- Kingdom: Animalia
- Phylum: Arthropoda
- Clade: Pancrustacea
- Class: Insecta
- Order: Coleoptera
- Suborder: Polyphaga
- Infraorder: Cucujiformia
- Family: Chrysomelidae
- Genus: Hystiopsis
- Species: H. marginalis

Binomial name
- Hystiopsis marginalis (Fabricius, 1801)

Synonyms
- Crioceris marginalis Fabricius, 1801

Species of beetle

Hystiopsis marginalis is a species of beetle of the family Chrysomelidae. It is found in Venezuela and Suriname.

== Description ==
Adults reach a length of about 6.5 mm. Adults are pale yellowish brown or reddish brown, with deeper brown markings of the elytron.
