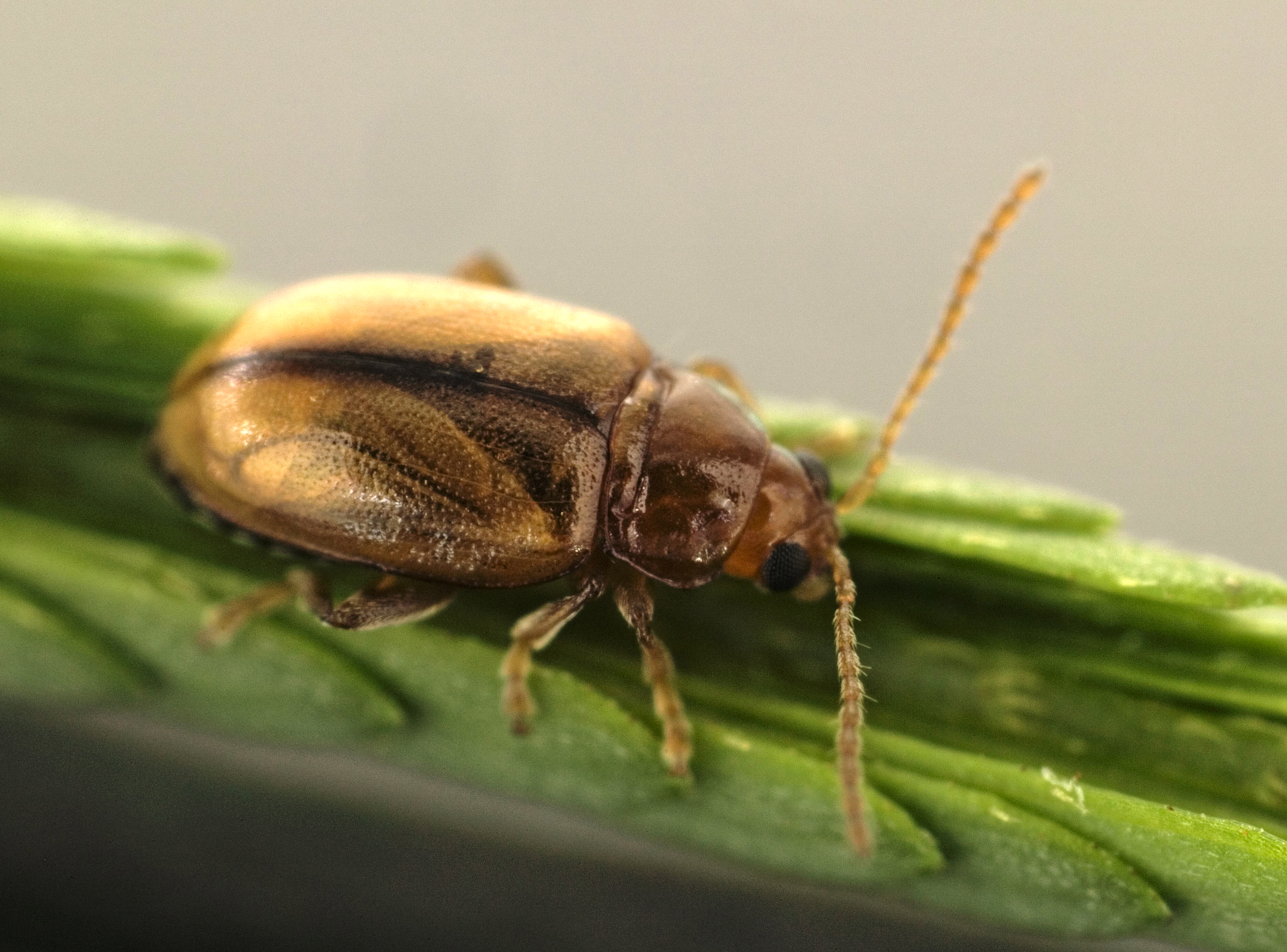

Scientific classification
- Kingdom: Animalia
- Phylum: Arthropoda
- Class: Insecta
- Order: Coleoptera
- Suborder: Polyphaga
- Infraorder: Cucujiformia
- Family: Chrysomelidae
- Tribe: Alticini
- Genus: Nesaecrepida
- Species: N. infuscata

Binomial name
- Nesaecrepida infuscata (Schaeffer, 1906)

= Nesaecrepida infuscata =

Species of beetle

Nesaecrepida infuscata is a species of flea beetle in the family Chrysomelidae. It is found in Central America and North America.

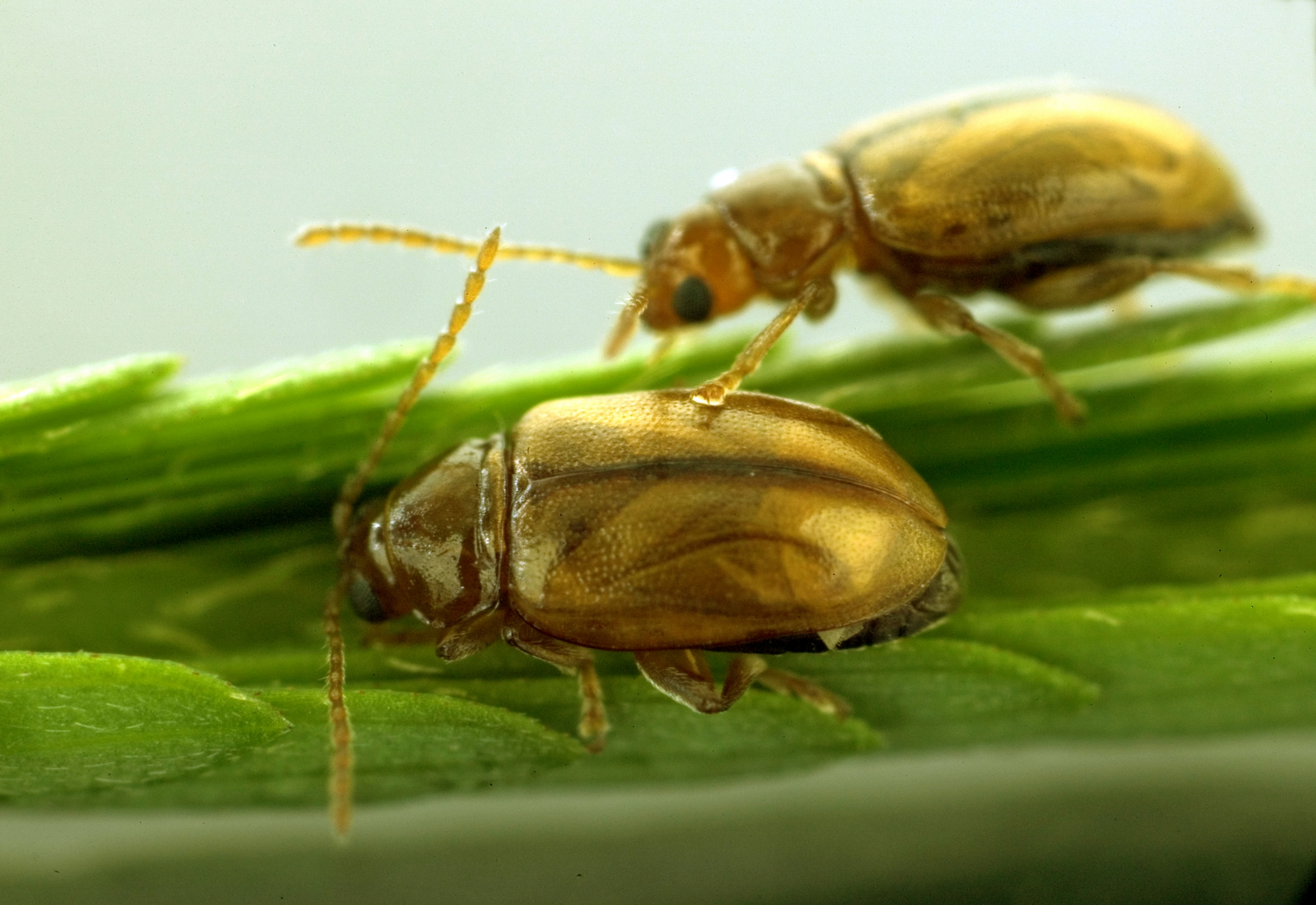
