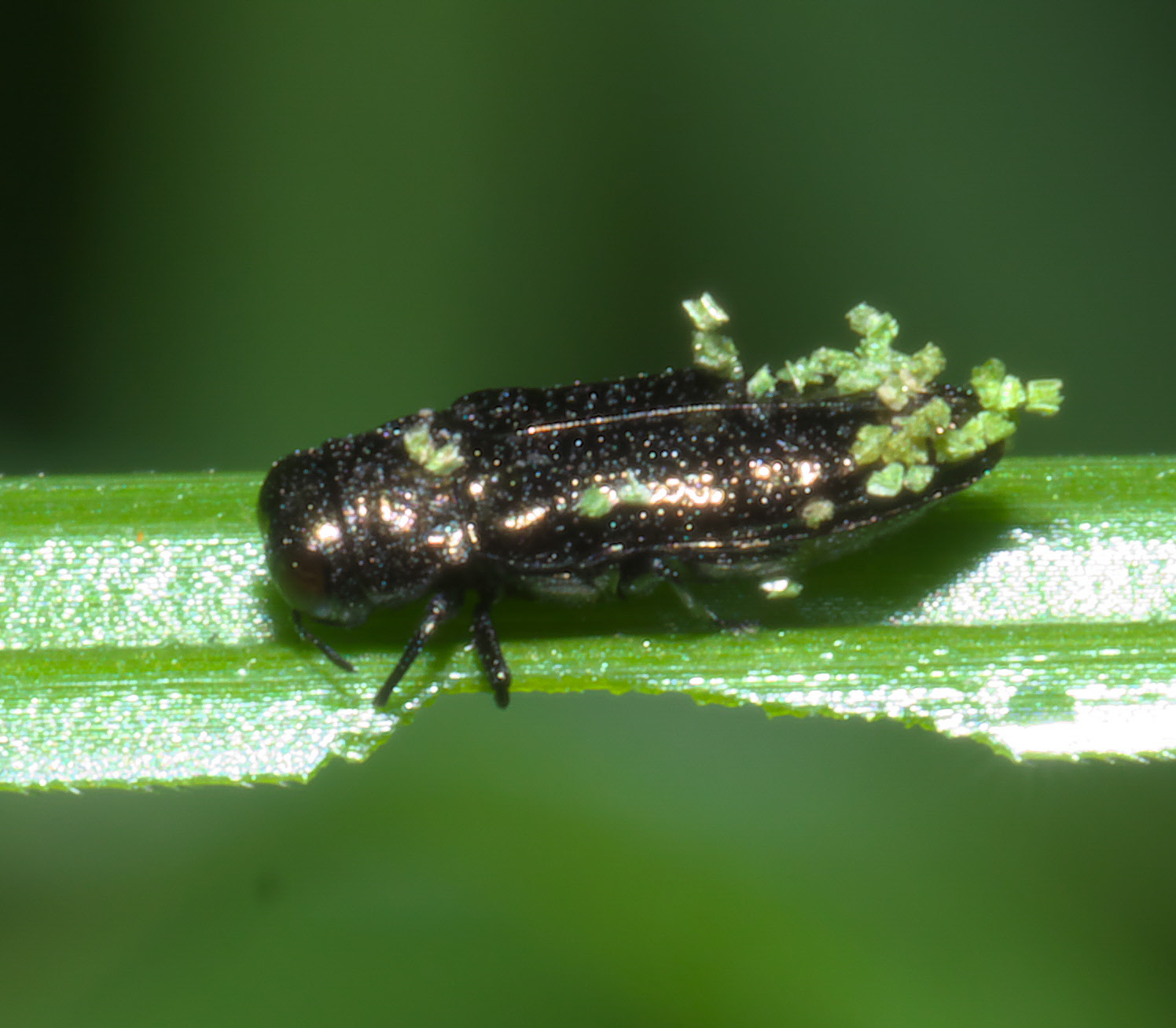
- Taphrocerus, Arkansas

Scientific classification
- Domain: Eukaryota
- Kingdom: Animalia
- Phylum: Arthropoda
- Class: Insecta
- Order: Coleoptera
- Suborder: Polyphaga
- Infraorder: Elateriformia
- Family: Buprestidae
- Subfamily: Agrilinae
- Tribe: Trachyini
- Subtribe: Brachyina
- Genus: Taphrocerus; Solier, 1833

Synonyms
- Parabrachys Cobos, 1979; Taphrocera Deyrolle, 1864

= Taphrocerus =

Genus of beetles

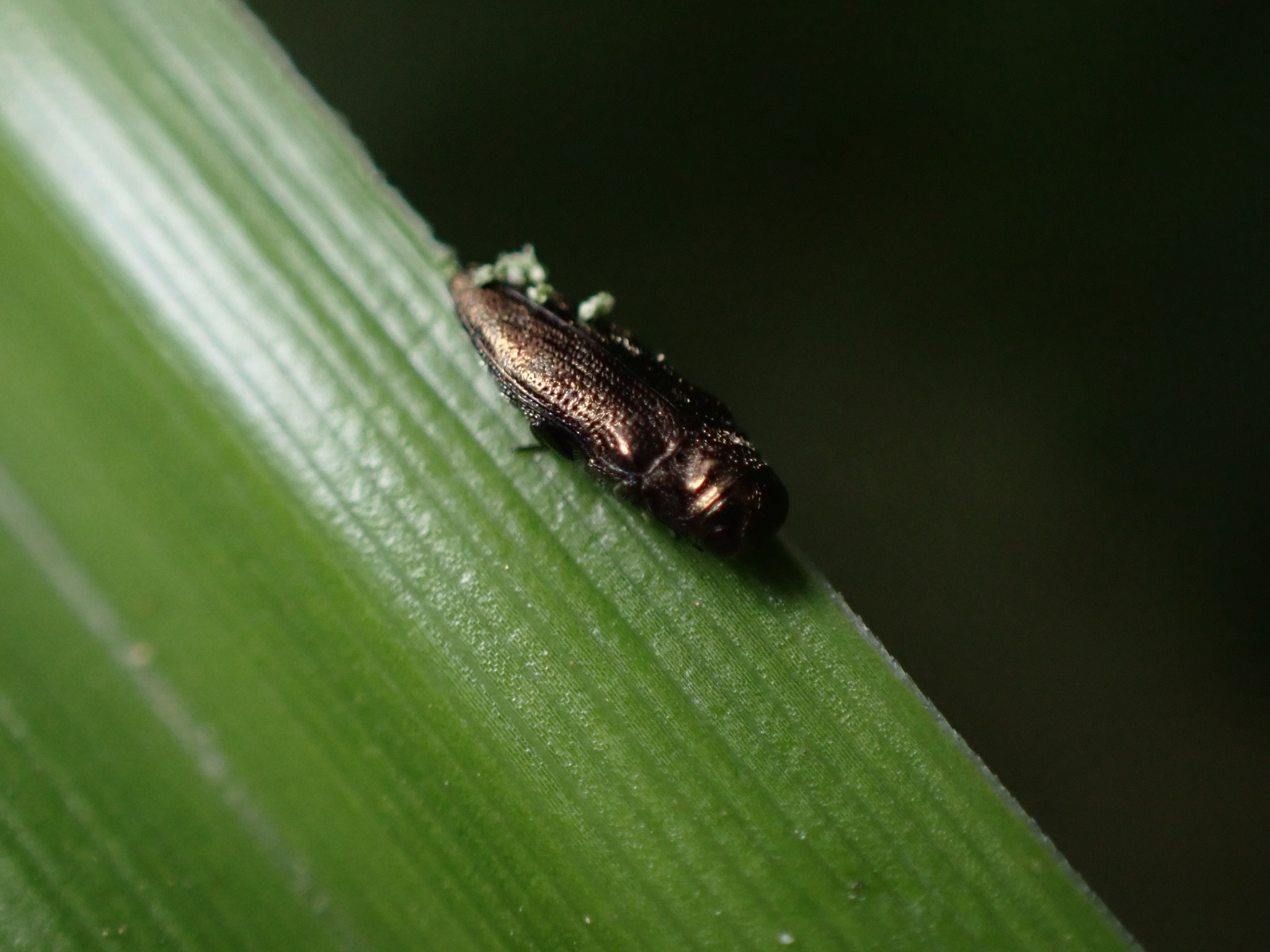
Taphrocerus chevrolati, Arizona

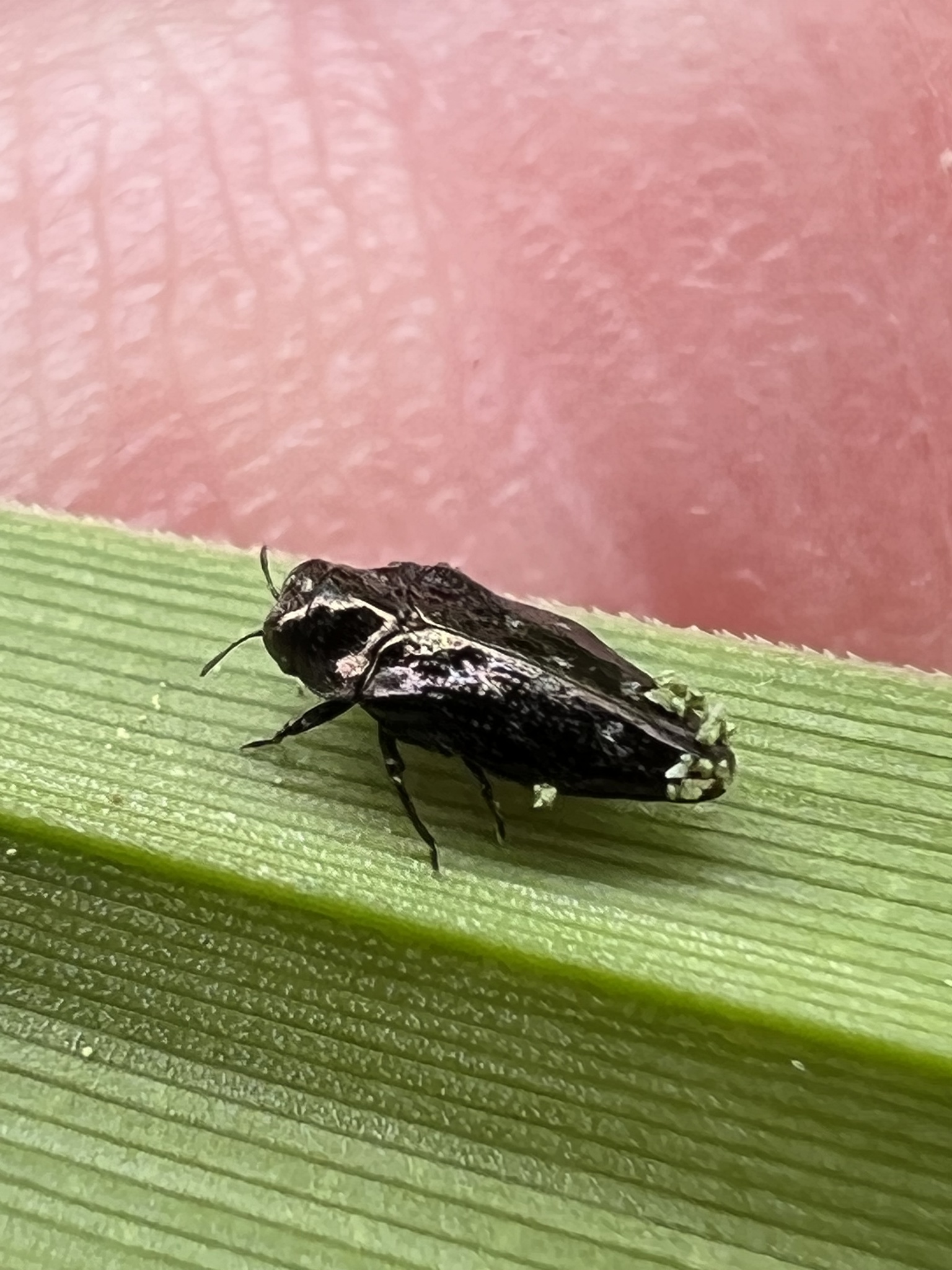
Taphrocerus gracilis, Virginia

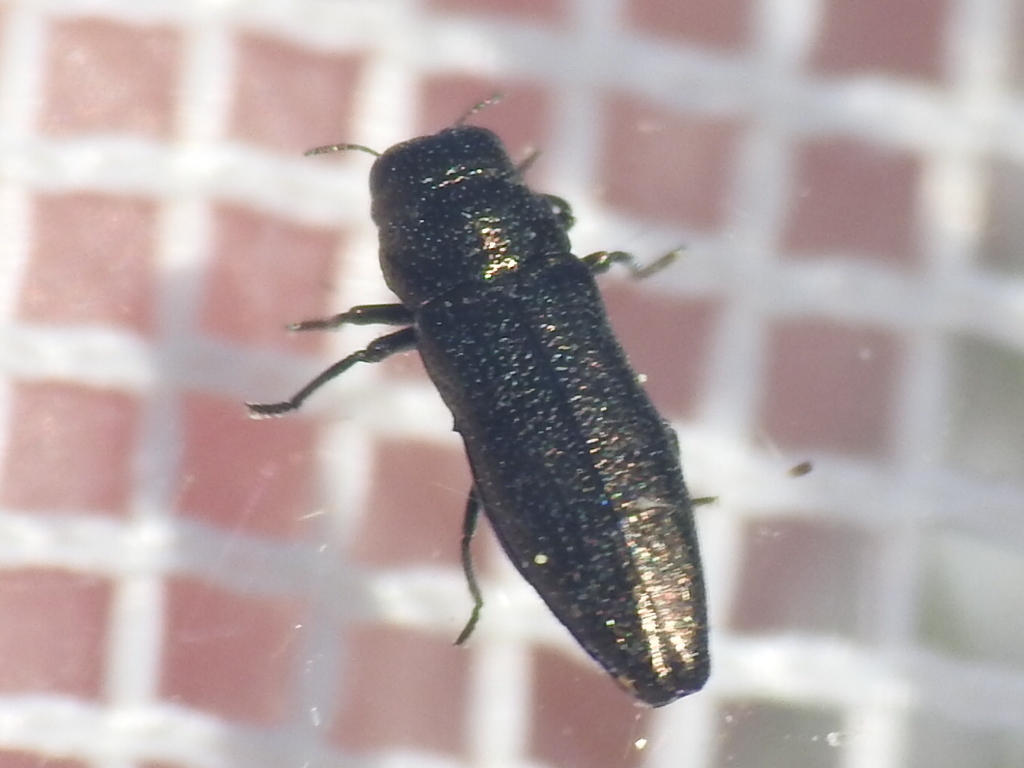
Taphrocerus agriloides, Texas

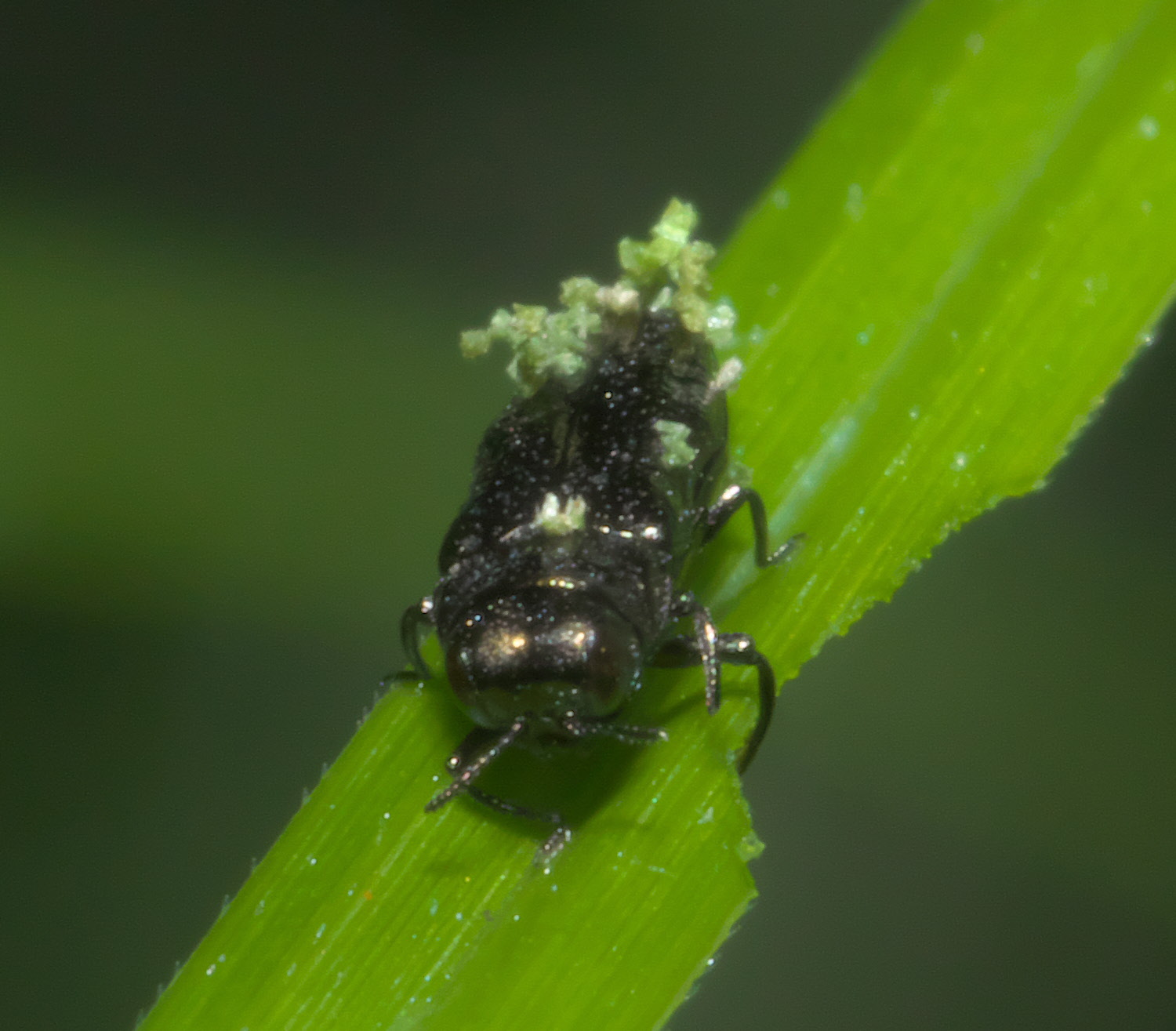
Taphrocerus, Arkansas

Taphrocerus is a genus of metallic wood-boring beetles in the family Buprestidae. There are more than 190 described species in Taphrocerus, found mainly in North, Central, and South America.

== Species ==
These 196 species belong to the genus Taphrocerus:

- Taphrocerus abscondus Marek, 2018
- Taphrocerus achardi Obenberger, 1924
- Taphrocerus acutus Obenberger, 1924
- Taphrocerus aeneocollis Fisher, 1925
- Taphrocerus aeneocupreus Fisher, 1925
- Taphrocerus agriliformis Kerremans, 1897
- Taphrocerus agriloides Crotch, 1873
- Taphrocerus albodistinctus Knull, 1954
- Taphrocerus albofasciatus Fisher, 1922
- Taphrocerus albomaculatus Fisher, 1928
- Taphrocerus albopictus (Kerremans, 1896)
- Taphrocerus alboplagiatus Kerremans, 1896
- Taphrocerus alutaceicollis Obenberger, 1934
- Taphrocerus amazonicus Kerremans, 1896
- Taphrocerus amplifrons Cobos, 1959
- Taphrocerus anayahani Marek, 2015
- Taphrocerus angustus (Gory, 1841)
- Taphrocerus argentinus Bruch, 1909
- Taphrocerus attenuatus Fisher, 1922
- Taphrocerus auratus Marek, 2017
- Taphrocerus aureomicans Obenberger, 1934
- Taphrocerus aureopilosus Obenberger, 1934
- Taphrocerus balthasari Obenberger, 1934
- Taphrocerus bifasciatus Kerremans, 1900
- Taphrocerus bourdaensis Marek, 2015
- Taphrocerus bruchi Obenberger, 1924
- Taphrocerus brulei Marek, 2019
- Taphrocerus bruneri Fisher, 1930
- Taphrocerus bucki Cobos, 1958
- Taphrocerus capensis Hespenheide, 1988
- Taphrocerus carinulosus Obenberger, 1941
- Taphrocerus catacaustus Obenberger, 1941
- Taphrocerus catharinae Obenberger, 1917
- Taphrocerus cayennensis Obenberger, 1934
- Taphrocerus cernosvitovi Obenberger, 1934
- Taphrocerus chalumeaui Hespenheide, 1998
- Taphrocerus chassaini Marek, 2018
- Taphrocerus chevrolati Obenberger, 1924
- Taphrocerus cocois Bondar, 1922
- Taphrocerus collarti Cobos, 1959
- Taphrocerus colombiae Obenberger, 1934
- Taphrocerus communis Waterhouse, 1889
- Taphrocerus compactus Obenberger, 1934
- Taphrocerus constantini Brûlé, 2012
- Taphrocerus costatus Waterhouse, 1889
- Taphrocerus cupriceps Kerremans, 1900
- Taphrocerus cyanipennis Obenberger, 1934
- Taphrocerus cylindricollis Kerremans, 1896
- Taphrocerus depilis Kerremans, 1896
- Taphrocerus deplanatus Théry, 1923
- Taphrocerus dietzi Fisher, 1933
- Taphrocerus difficilis Obenberger, 1924
- Taphrocerus dudai Obenberger, 1924
- Taphrocerus elegans Fisher, 1925
- Taphrocerus elongatus (Gory, 1841)
- Taphrocerus embriki Obenberger, 1934
- Taphrocerus erbeni Obenberger, 1941
- Taphrocerus exiguus Obenberger, 1934
- Taphrocerus fabichi Obenberger, 1934
- Taphrocerus fasciatus Waterhouse, 1889
- Taphrocerus fastidiosus Cobos, 1959
- Taphrocerus fennahi Théry, 1947
- Taphrocerus finitimus Obenberger, 1924
- Taphrocerus fisherellus Obenberger, 1937
- Taphrocerus fisheri Obenberger, 1924
- Taphrocerus floridanus Obenberger, 1934
- Taphrocerus fragilis Marek, 2015
- Taphrocerus gentilis (Gory, 1841)
- Taphrocerus gracilis (Say, 1825)
- Taphrocerus gratiosus Obenberger, 1934
- Taphrocerus guttatus Waterhouse, 1889
- Taphrocerus guyanae Obenberger, 1934
- Taphrocerus haenkei Obenberger, 1924
- Taphrocerus haitiensis Fisher, 1949
- Taphrocerus halffteri Cobos, 1978
- Taphrocerus hansi Obenberger, 1924
- Taphrocerus havai Marek, 2016
- Taphrocerus helferi Obenberger, 1924
- Taphrocerus hintoni Fisher, 1938
- Taphrocerus holiki Obenberger, 1924
- Taphrocerus howardi Obenberger, 1934
- Taphrocerus hrdyi Marek, 2015
- Taphrocerus hypocrita Obenberger, 1934
- Taphrocerus innubus (Fabricius, 1801)
- Taphrocerus inusitatus Obenberger, 1941
- Taphrocerus jaroslavi Marek, 2019
- Taphrocerus joukli Obenberger, 1924
- Taphrocerus kapczyhaberi Apt, 1954
- Taphrocerus kerremansi Dugès, 1891
- Taphrocerus kheili Obenberger, 1924
- Taphrocerus klimschi Obenberger, 1917
- Taphrocerus kormilevi Cobos, 1956
- Taphrocerus krepelkai Marek, 2015
- Taphrocerus kubani Marek, 2017
- Taphrocerus laesicollis Chevrolat, 1867
- Taphrocerus laevicollis LeConte, 1878
- Taphrocerus laticeps Marek, 2019
- Taphrocerus leoni Dugès, 1891
- Taphrocerus lepidus Obenberger, 1934
- Taphrocerus liliputanus Cobos, 1959
- Taphrocerus loretanus Obenberger, 1934
- Taphrocerus luederwaldti Obenberger, 1934
- Taphrocerus major Cobos, 1978
- Taphrocerus matouryensis Marek, 2016
- Taphrocerus mercedensis White, 1947
- Taphrocerus meridionalis Obenberger, 1934
- Taphrocerus mexicanus Waterhouse, 1889
- Taphrocerus micropilosus Cobos, 1959
- Taphrocerus minutus Kerremans, 1903
- Taphrocerus missionarius Obenberger, 1934
- Taphrocerus modicus Fisher, 1925
- Taphrocerus mrazi Obenberger, 1924
- Taphrocerus nanulus Obenberger, 1934
- Taphrocerus natalensis Cobos, 1967
- Taphrocerus nickerli Obenberger, 1924
- Taphrocerus nicolayi Obenberger, 1924
- Taphrocerus niger Marek, 2016
- Taphrocerus nigricollis Marek, 2015
- Taphrocerus nigritulus Waterhouse, 1889
- Taphrocerus nugator (Gory, 1841)
- Taphrocerus obenbergeri Apt, 1954
- Taphrocerus obscurellus Obenberger, 1934
- Taphrocerus ogloblini Obenberger, 1934
- Taphrocerus olivierai Cobos, 1978
- Taphrocerus orizabae Obenberger, 1934
- Taphrocerus paradoxus Marek, 2017
- Taphrocerus paraguayensis Obenberger, 1924
- Taphrocerus parallelus Kerremans, 1896
- Taphrocerus paranaensis Obenberger, 1924
- Taphrocerus parvus Obenberger, 1924
- Taphrocerus pauligenus Obenberger, 1934
- Taphrocerus pereirai Cobos, 1959
- Taphrocerus pertyi Obenberger, 1934
- Taphrocerus peruvianus Obenberger, 1941
- Taphrocerus pictus Kerremans, 1896
- Taphrocerus politus Cobos, 1967
- Taphrocerus potamicus Obenberger, 1934
- Taphrocerus potamophilus Obenberger, 1934
- Taphrocerus preissi Obenberger, 1924
- Taphrocerus pressli Obenberger, 1924
- Taphrocerus pseudovolitans Obenberger, 1941
- Taphrocerus psilopteroides Waterhouse, 1889
- Taphrocerus pumilus Obenberger, 1934
- Taphrocerus puncticollis Schwarz, 1878
- Taphrocerus punctuliceps Obenberger, 1934
- Taphrocerus purpureipennis Waterhouse, 1889
- Taphrocerus putillus Obenberger, 1934
- Taphrocerus pygmaeus Cobos, 1967
- Taphrocerus quadriplagiatus Obeneberger, 1924
- Taphrocerus rambouseki Obenberger, 1924
- Taphrocerus reimoseri Obenberger, 1924
- Taphrocerus riparius Obenberger, 1934
- Taphrocerus rotundicollis Obenberger, 1924
- Taphrocerus rusticus Thomson, 1879
- Taphrocerus saintantoinnei Marek, 2016
- Taphrocerus santipauli Obenberger, 1934
- Taphrocerus schaefferi Nicolay & Weiss, 1920
- Taphrocerus scriptus Obenberger, 1924
- Taphrocerus scutellatus Obenberger, 1934
- Taphrocerus sedyi Obenberger, 1924
- Taphrocerus seidli Marek, 2015
- Taphrocerus sericans Cobos, 1967
- Taphrocerus sericeicollis Cobos, 1959
- Taphrocerus shannoni Fisher, 1933
- Taphrocerus simillimus Obenberger, 1924
- Taphrocerus singularis Obenberger, 1924
- Taphrocerus snizeki Marek, 2015
- Taphrocerus squamulatus Kerremans, 1896
- Taphrocerus stephani Marek, 2020
- Taphrocerus strandi Obenberger, 1934
- Taphrocerus stygicus Thomson, 1879
- Taphrocerus subcarinulosus Cobos, 1967
- Taphrocerus subglaber Fisher, 1925
- Taphrocerus subpolitus Cobos, 1967
- Taphrocerus sulcifrons Fisher, 1922
- Taphrocerus susterai Obenberger, 1941
- Taphrocerus szekessyi Apt, 1954
- Taphrocerus tao Zayas, 1988
- Taphrocerus tavakiliani Marek, 2016
- Taphrocerus temporalis Obenberger, 1934
- Taphrocerus tenellus (Gory, 1841)
- Taphrocerus tennenbaumi Obenberger, 1934
- Taphrocerus tenuis (Kirsch, 1873)
- Taphrocerus tetragraptus Obenberger, 1941
- Taphrocerus theryi Obenberger, 1924
- Taphrocerus tigrensis Obenberger, 1947
- Taphrocerus timidus Chevrolat, 1867
- Taphrocerus troniceki Obenberger, 1937
- Taphrocerus ujhelyii Apt, 1954
- Taphrocerus unicolor Obenberger, 1924
- Taphrocerus volitans (Gory, 1841)
- Taphrocerus wagneri Kerremans, 1913
- Taphrocerus wendleri Obenberger, 1924
- Taphrocerus wimmeri Obenberger, 1924
- Taphrocerus winteri Obenberger, 1924
- Taphrocerus zikani Obenberger, 1924
