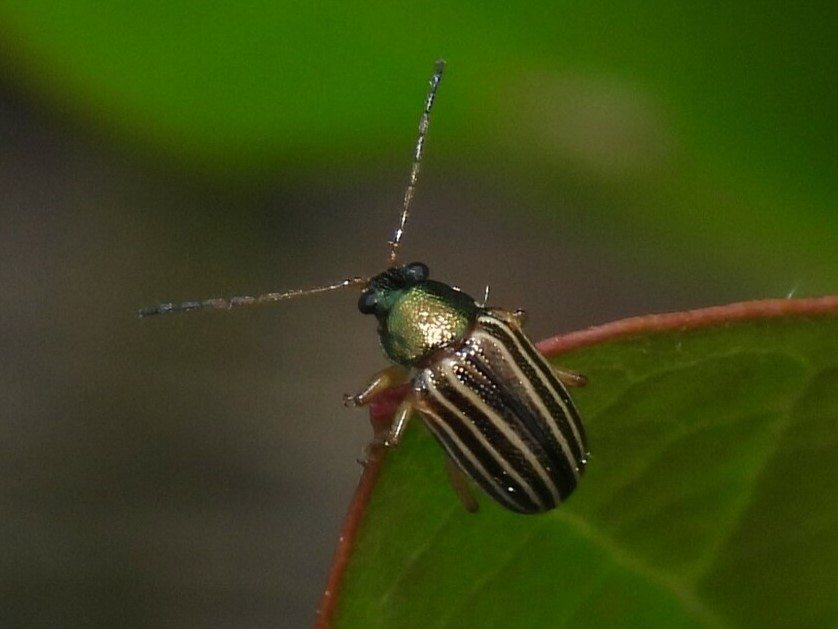

Scientific classification
- Kingdom: Animalia
- Phylum: Arthropoda
- Clade: Pancrustacea
- Class: Insecta
- Order: Coleoptera
- Suborder: Polyphaga
- Infraorder: Cucujiformia
- Family: Chrysomelidae
- Genus: Colaspis
- Species: C. costipennis

Binomial name
- Colaspis costipennis Crotch, 1873

Synonyms
- Colaspis brunnea var. costipennis Crotch, 1873; Colaspis crotchi Lefèvre, 1884

= Colaspis costipennis =

Species of beetle

Colaspis costipennis is a species of leaf beetle from in eastern North America. It is mostly found in coastal states; in the United States, its range extends from Louisiana and Georgia north to New Hampshire and Pennsylvania, and in Canada, it is reported from Ontario. It was originally described as a variety of Colaspis brunnea, but it is now recognised as a distinct species. It is included in the Colaspis suilla species group by Riley (2020).
