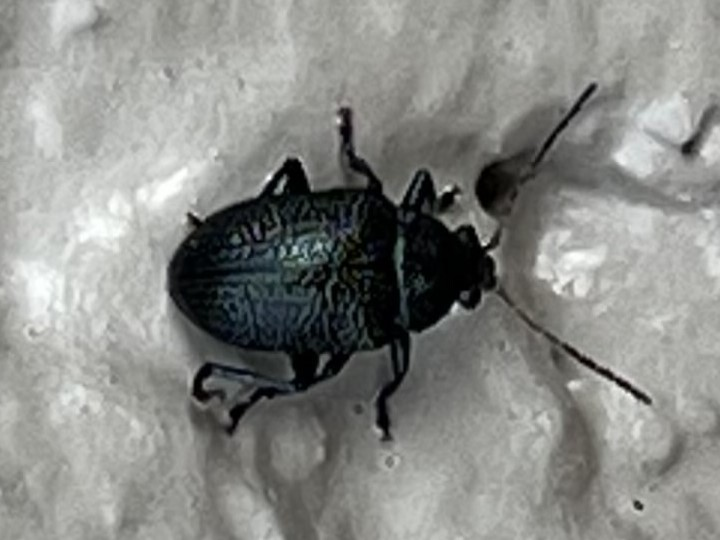

Scientific classification
- Kingdom: Animalia
- Phylum: Arthropoda
- Clade: Pancrustacea
- Class: Insecta
- Order: Coleoptera
- Suborder: Polyphaga
- Infraorder: Cucujiformia
- Family: Chrysomelidae
- Genus: Colaspis
- Species: C. nigrocyanea

Binomial name
- Colaspis nigrocyanea Crotch, 1873

= Colaspis nigrocyanea =

Species of beetle

Colaspis nigrocyanea is a species of leaf beetle from North America. It is distributed in Arizona and Mexico. It was first described by the British entomologist George Robert Crotch in 1873.
