= Colaspis favosa =

Scientific classification
- Kingdom: Animalia
- Phylum: Arthropoda
- Clade: Pancrustacea
- Class: Insecta
- Order: Coleoptera
- Suborder: Polyphaga
- Infraorder: Cucujiformia
- Family: Chrysomelidae
- Genus: Colaspis
- Species: C. favosa

Binomial name
- Colaspis favosa Say, 1824

Species of beetle

Colaspis favosa is a species of leaf beetle from North America. It is found mostly along the Gulf and Atlantic coasts of the United States; its range spans from Texas to Georgia and to New York.
