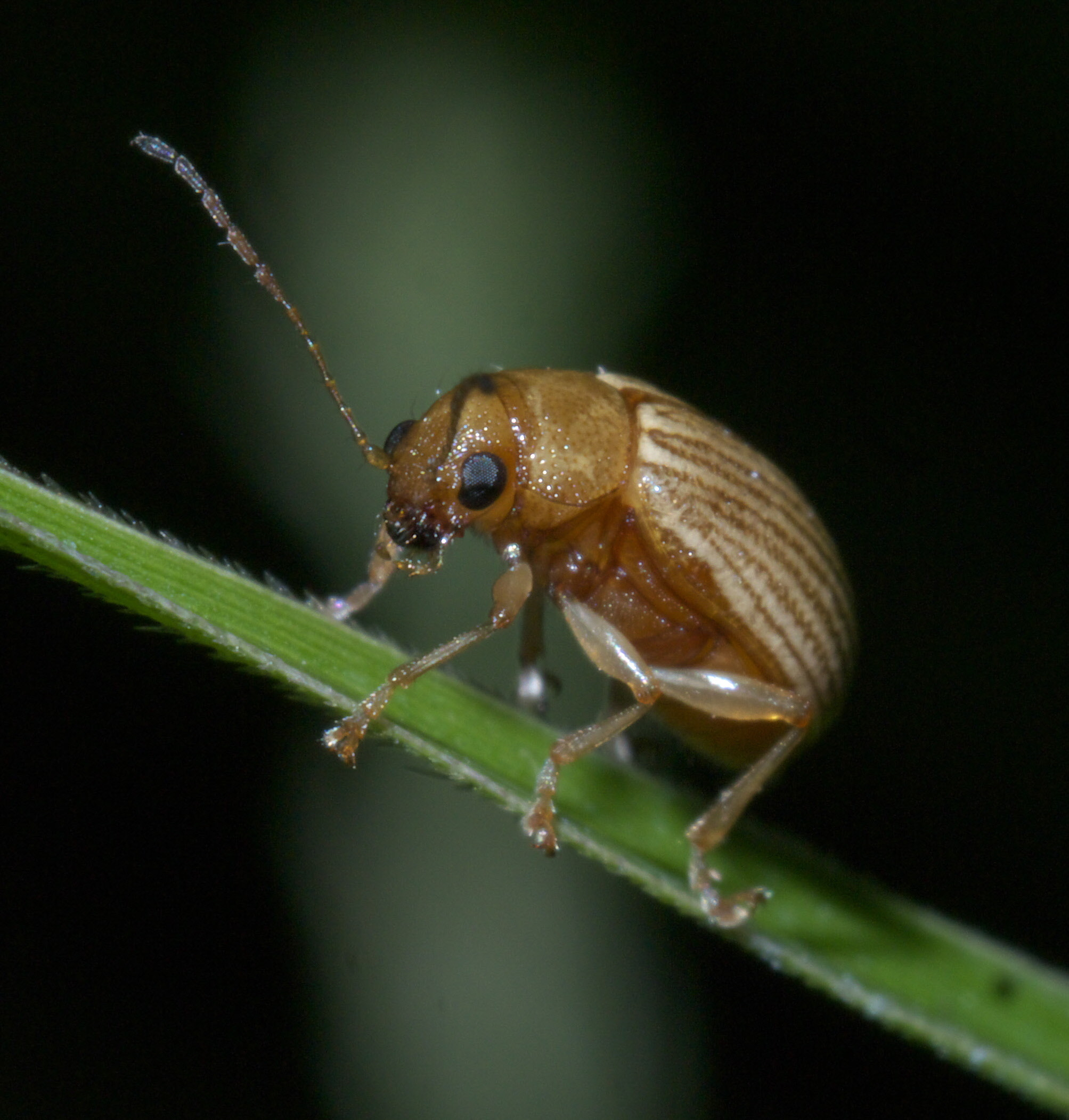

Scientific classification
- Kingdom: Animalia
- Phylum: Arthropoda
- Clade: Pancrustacea
- Class: Insecta
- Order: Coleoptera
- Suborder: Polyphaga
- Infraorder: Cucujiformia
- Family: Chrysomelidae
- Genus: Colaspis
- Species: C. brunnea

Binomial name
- Colaspis brunnea (Fabricius, 1798)

Synonyms
- Colaspis flavida (Say, 1824); Eumolpus flavidus Say, 1824; Galleruca brunnea Fabricius, 1798

= Colaspis brunnea =

Species of beetle

Colaspis brunnea, the grape colaspis, is a species of leaf beetle from North America. It mainly occurs in the eastern United States. It is a pest of crop such as corn and soybeans, but damage by it has not been documented as economically significant. It is univoltine, and overwinters in the soil as larvae.

The adults are brown-colored (brunnea is Latin for brown) and are around 5 mm in length. The elytra have a series of parallel rows of "puncture" marks. The larvae are scarabaeiform grub with white-grey bodies and orange head capsules, and are between 5 and 6.5 mm long at the 10th instar.

== Gallery ==
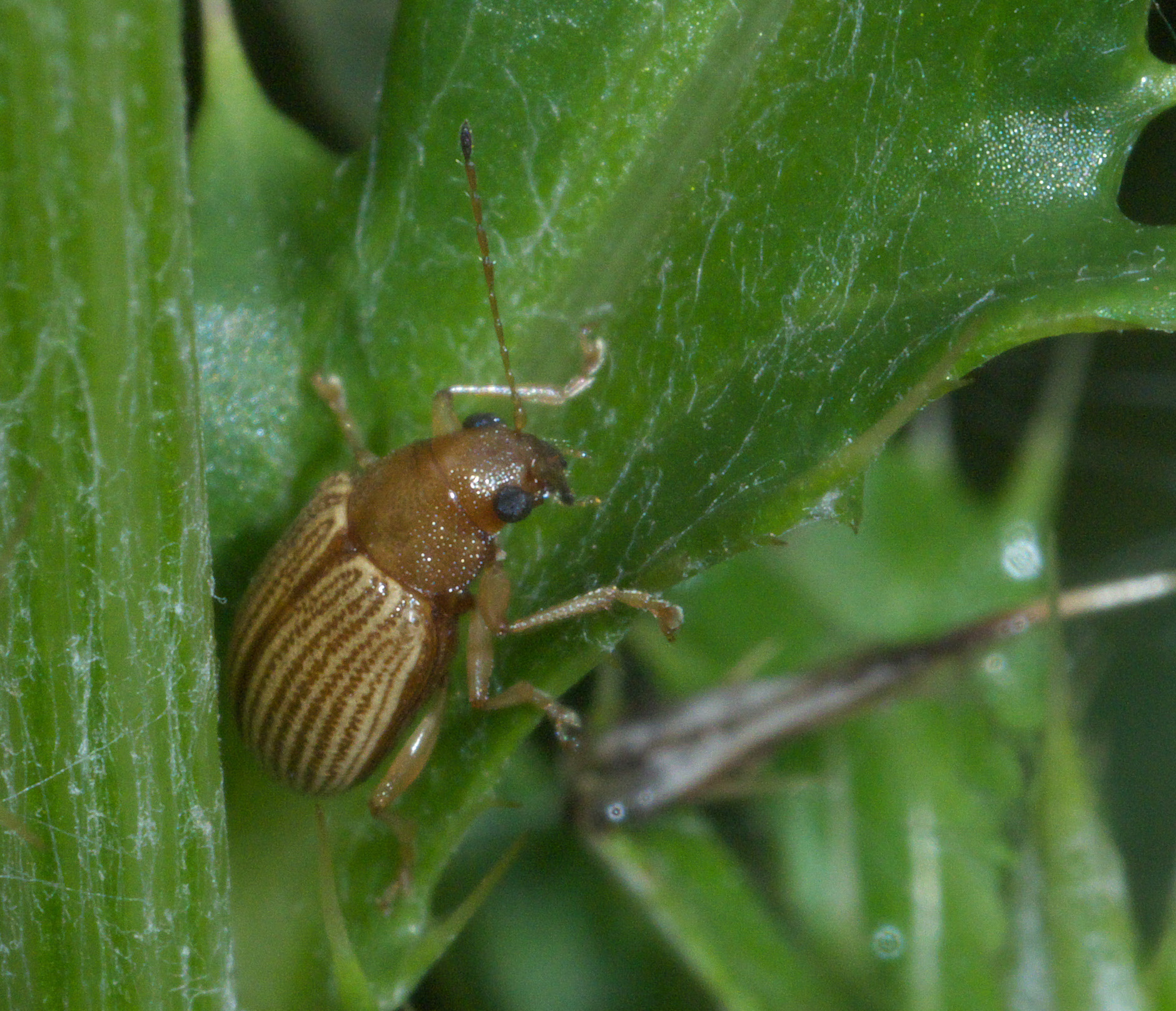
Grape colaspis, Colaspis brunnea
