= Charles Frederic August Schaeffer =

American entomologist

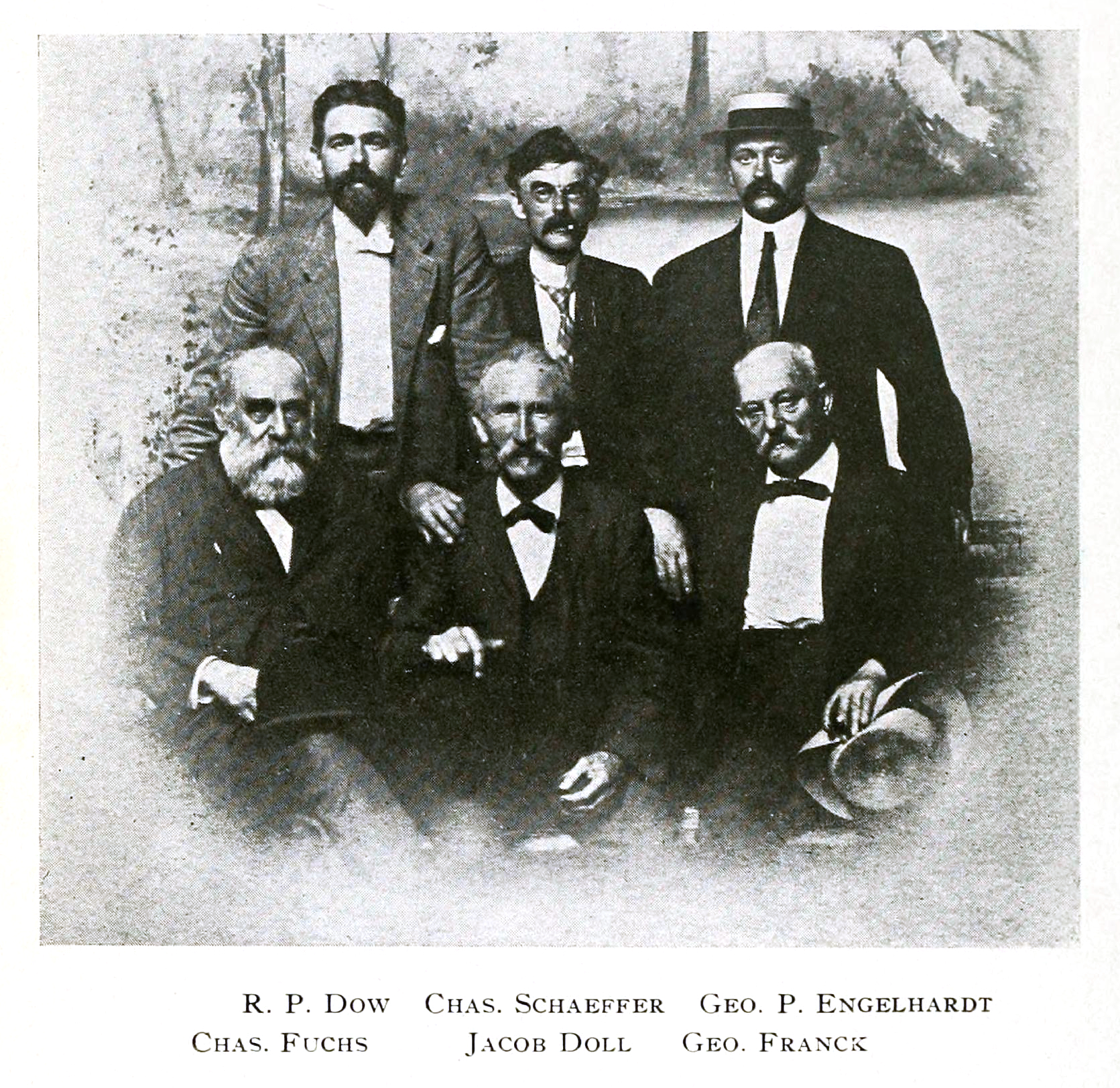
Schaeffer, standing middle, in 1914 with other Brooklyn entomologists

Charles Frederic August Schaeffer (12 June 1860 – 29 August 1934) was an American entomologist who specialized in beetles, particularly chrysomelids and weevils. He described 109 species in 91 genera and some species like Taphrocerus schaefferi Nicolay & Weiss were described from his collections and named after him.

Schaeffer was born in London to Karl August Wilhelm Ferdinand Schäffer, a native of Prussia, and Charlotte Ernestine Dorette Koch of Hanover. When the family returned to Germany, he was educated there and became interested in insects at a very young age. He immigrated to the United States in 1886 and became a U.S. citizen in 1898.

He was one of the founding members of the Brooklyn Entomological Society in 1892. He was an active member of the group and in 1898, he became an assistant to William Beutenmuller of the American Museum of Natural History, becoming a curator in 1902 at the Brooklyn Museum Institute of Arts and Sciences. He made numerous collecting trips mainly in Mount Mitchell, North Carolina; Lower Rio Grande Valley, Texas (Esperanza Ranch east of Brownsville); and the Huachuca Mountains of Arizona. He described numerous species in his publications.

Schaefers's publications include:

- Schaeffer, C. (1901). "Synopsis of the species of Trechus, with the description of a new species". Bulletin of the American Museum of Natural History. 14: 209–212.
- Schaeffer, C. (1903). "Two new Ptinidae". Canadian Entomologist. 35 (9): 263–264. doi:10.4039/Ent35263-9. S2CID 82325417.
- Schaeffer, C. (1904). "New genera and species of Coleoptera". Journal of the New York Entomological Society. 12 (4): 197–236.
- Schaeffer, C. (1905). "Additions to the Coleoptera of the United States with notes on some known species". Science Bulletin of the Museum of the Brooklyn Institute of Arts and Sciences. 1 (6): 123–140.
- Schaeffer, C. (1905). "Some additional new genera and species of Coleoptera found within the limit of the United States". Science Bulletin of the Museum of the Brooklyn Institute of Arts and Sciences. 1 (7): 141–179.
- Schaeffer, C. (1905). "Three new species of the genus Statira Latreille". Journal of the New York Entomological Society. 13: 179–181.
- Schaeffer, C. (1906). "New Anthribidae". Transactions of the American Entomological Society. 32: 267–278.
- Schaeffer, C. (1906). "On new and known genera and species of the family Chrysomelidae". Brooklyn Institute Museum Science Bulletin. 1 (9): 221–253.
- Schaeffer, C. (1906). "New Dascyllidae". Psyche: A Journal of Entomology. 13 (5): 114–116. doi:10.1155/1906/86497.
- Schaeffer, C. 1906 (1906). "Notes on some species of the genus Anomala with descriptions of new species". Journal of the New York Entomological Society. 14 (1): 1–5.
- Schaeffer, C. (1906). "Two new Oncideres, with notes on some other Coleoptera". Canadian Entomologist. 38: 18–23. doi:10.4039/Ent3818-1. S2CID 85291427.
- Schaeffer, C. 1906 (1906). "Six new Pselaphidae". Transactions of the American Entomological Society. 32 (3&4): 261–278.
- Schaeffer, C. (1907). "New Bruchidae with notes on known species and list of species known to occur at Brownsville, Texas, and in the Huachuca Mountains, Arizona". Museum of Brooklyn's Institute for Arts and Sciences, Science Bulletin. 1 (10): 291–306.
- Schaeffer, C. (1907). "New Scarabaeidae". Journal of the New York Entomological Society. 15: 60–75.
- Schaeffer, C. (1907). "New Rhynchophora II". Journal of the New York Entomological Society. 15: 75–80.
- Schaeffer, C. (1907). "A few new Coleoptera of the genus Bitoma with notes on other Colydiidae". Proceedings of the Entomological Society of Washington. 8 (3–4): 136–141.
- Schaeffer, C. (1908). "On North American and some Cuban Copelatus". Journal of the New York Entomological Society. 16 (2): 16–18.
- Schaeffer, C. (1908). "List of the Lampyridae from the Huachuca Mountains, Arizona, with descriptions of new species". Journal of the New York Entomological Society. 16: 61–67.
- Schaeffer, C. (1908). "On New and Known Coleoptera of the Families Coccinellidae and Cleridae". Journal of the New York Entomological Society. 16 (3): 125–135.
- Schaeffer, C. 1908 (1908). "New Rhynchophora III". Journal of the New York Entomological Society. 16: 213–222.
- Schaeffer, C. 1908 (1901). "List of the longicorn Coleoptera collected on the museum expeditions to Brownsville, Texas, and the Huachuca Mts., Arizona, with descriptions of new genera and species and notes on known species". The Museum of the Brooklyn Institute of Arts and Sciences Science Bulletin. 1 (12): 325–352.
- Schaeffer, C. (1909). "New Coleoptera chiefly from Arizona". Science Bulletin of the Museum of the Brooklyn Institute of Arts and Sciences. 1 (16): 375–386.
- Schaeffer, C. 1909 (1909). "Four new Cerambycidae". Journal of the New York Entomological Society. 17 (3): 99–103.
- Schaeffer, C. (1909). "Three Cuban Coleoptera new to the fauna of the United States". Journal of the New York Entomological Society. 17 (4): 148–150.
- Schaeffer, C. (1910). "Additions to the Carabidae of North America with notes on species already known". The Museum of the Brooklyn Institute of Arts and Sciences Bulletin. 1 (17): 391–405.
- Schaeffer, C. (1910). "New clavicorn Coleoptera". Journal of the New York Entomological Society. 26: 210–216.
- Schaeffer, C. (1911). "New Coleoptera and miscellaneous notes". Journal of the New York Entomological Society. 19: 113–126.
- Schaeffer, C. (1912). "On Metachroma laterale, pallidum and laevicolle (Coleop.)". Bulletin of the Brooklyn Entomological Society. 8: 25.
- Schaeffer, C. (1914). "A short review of the North American species of Onthophagus (Coleoptera: Scarabeidae)". Journal of the New York Entomological Society. 22: 290–300.
- Schaeffer, C. (1915). "New Coleoptera and miscellaneous notes". Journal of the New York Entomological Society. 23: 47–55.
- Schaeffer, C. (1916). "New Diptera of the Family Asilidae with Notes on Known Species". Journal of the New York Entomological Society. 24: 65–69.
- Schaeffer, C. (1916). "New species of Throscidae (Col.)". Bulletin of the Brooklyn Entomological Society. 11: 62–63.
- Schaeffer, C. (1916). "Two new species of Cebrio". Bulletin of the Brooklyn Entomological Society. 11: 107–108.
- Schaeffer, C. (1916). "New species of the family Elateridae". Journal of the New York Entomological Society. 24: 256–267.
- Schaeffer, C. (1917). "Notes on a few Eucnemidae and descriptions of new Elateridae". Bulletin of the Brooklyn Entomological Society. 12: 39–44.
- Schaeffer, C. (1917). "On some new and known Melandryidae". Canadian Entomologist. 49 (10): 357–360. doi:10.4039/Ent49357-10. S2CID 84326755.
- Schaeffer, C. (1917). "On Merium and some blue Callidium". Journal of the New York Entomological Society. 25 (3): 183–187.
- Schaeffer, C. (1918). "On some genera and species of the family Ostomidae". Journal of the New York Entomological Society. 26: 190–201.
- Schaeffer, C. (1918). "Miscellaneous coleopterological notes and descriptions". Journal of the New York Entomological Society. 26: 211–214.
- Schaeffer, C. (1919). "Synonymical and other notes on some species of the family Chrysomelidae and descriptions of new species". Journal of the New York Entomological Society. 27: 307–340.
- Schaeffer, C. (1921). "New species of North American clerid beetles of the genus Aulicus.". Proceedings of the United States National Museum. 59 (2365): 151–159. doi:10.5479/si.00963801.2365.151.
- Schaeffer, C. (1924). "On new and old Chrysomelidae". Journal of the New York Entomological Society. 32: 138–145.
- Schaeffer, C. (1925). "Revision of the New World species of the tribe Donaciini of the coleopterous family Chrysomelidae". Brooklyn Museum Science Bulletin. 3 (3): 45–164.
- Schaeffer, C. (1925). "New species and varieties of North American Cassidini (Coleoptera, Chrysomeildae). Journal of the New York Entomological Society". 33: 233–237.
- Schaeffer, C. (1926). "New species of Boloschesis (=Chamys) with notes on known species (Coleoptera; Chrysolemidae; Fulcidacinae)". Proceedings of the Entomological Society of Washington. 28 (8): 181–187.
- Schaeffer, C. (1928). "Notes on the species of Lina and allied genera (Coleoptera; Chrysom.)". The Canadian Entomologist. 60 (2): 42–47. doi:10.4039/Ent6042-2. S2CID 83683843.
- Schaeffer, C. (1928). "The North American species of Hydrothassa with notes on other Chrysomeidae and a description of new species and a variety (Col.)". Journal of the New York Entomological Society. 36: 287–291.
- Schaeffer, C. (1929). "The North American species of Parandra (Cerambycidae)". Bulletin of the Brooklyn Entomological Society. 24: 38–40.
- Schaeffer, C. (1931). "On a few new and known Coleoptera". Bulletin of the Brooklyn Entomological Society. 26: 174–176.
- Schaeffer, C. (1931). "New species of Disonycha and notes (Col. Chrysomelidae)". Journal of the New York Entomological Society. 39: 279–285.
- Schaeffer, C. (1932). "Notes on some Galerucinae with descriptions of new species (Col., Chrysomelidae)". The Canadian Entomologist. 64 (10): 236–239. doi:10.4039/Ent64236b-10. S2CID 85229126.
- Schaeffer, C. (1932). "Notes on some Halticinae with descriptions of new species (Col., Chrysomelidae)". Bulletin of the Brooklyn Entomological Society. 27: 239–245.
- Schaeffer, C. (1932). "Notes and descriptions of new Cerambycidae". Bulletin of the Brooklyn Entomological Society. 27 (3): 152–154.
- Schaeffer, C. (1933). "Notes on some Hispini and Cassidini and descriptions of new species (Coleoptera, Chrysomelidae)". Pan-Pacific Entomologist. 9: 103–109.
- Schaeffer, C. (1933). "Short Studies in the Chrysomelidae (Coleoptera)". Journal of the New York Entomological Society. 41: 296–325.
- Schaeffer, C. (1933). "Short Studies in the Chrysomelidae (Coleoptera)". Journal of the New York Entomological Society. 41: 457–480.
