= Doris Holmes Blake =

American entomologist and scientific illustrator (1892-1978)

- Born: Doris Mildred Holmes; January 11, 1892; Stoughton, Massachusetts
- Died: December 3, 1978 (aged 86)
- Education: Boston University; Radcliffe College
- Scientific career
- Fields: Entomology
- Workplaces: United States Department of Agriculture; United States National Museum; Smithsonian Institution

Doris Holmes Blake, née Doris Mildred Holmes (January 11, 1892 – December 3, 1978), was an American entomologist and scientific illustrator.

She was an expert on chrysomelidae (leaf beetles).

== Life ==
Doris Holmes was raised in a middle-class family in Stoughton, Massachusetts. She earned a B.A. from Boston University in 1913 and an M.A. in Zoology and Psychology from Radcliffe College in 1917. While at Boston University she worked as a clerk at the Boston Psychopathic Hospital, and she became a member of Alpha Delta Pi. Marrying the botanist and plant taxonomist Sidney Fay Blake in 1918, she worked for the Bureau of Entomology of the United States Department of Agriculture from 1919 to 1928. From 1928 she worked at the Department of Entomology of the United States National Museum. Forced to resign in 1933 by her husband's employment at the Department (the law prohibited more than one member of a family holding a government position), she continued studying beetles as an unpaid Associate of the Smithsonian Institution at Washington, D.C. until her death.

Some of Blake's entomological and botanical sketches, as well as her non-academic writing, are also included. The papers also include a number of photographs of Blake and her family and of entomologists, both at the Smithsonian and at USDA. Her papers are held by the Smithsonian Institution.

== Works ==
- A review of the beetles of the genus Disonycha occurring in America north of Mexico, 1934. Smithsonian Institution.
- A study of LeConte's species of the chrysomelid genus Graphops with descriptions of some new species, 1955
- A review of the beetles of the genus Neobrotica and some closely related genera, 1966. Proceedings of the United States National Museum, v. 118, no. 3529.
- A review of the beetles of the genus Metachroma Chevrolat (Coleoptera: Chrysomelidae), 1970. Smithsonian contributions to zoology, no. 57.
- The costate species of Colaspis in the United States (Coleoptera: Chrysomelidae), 1974. Smithsonian contributions to zoology, no. 181.
- The brown semicostate and costate species of Colaspis in Mexico and Central America (Coleoptera: Chrysomelidae), 1976. Technical bulletin (United States. Dept. of Agriculture), no. 1534.
