= Antitypona =

Scientific classification
- Kingdom: Animalia
- Phylum: Arthropoda
- Clade: Pancrustacea
- Class: Insecta
- Order: Coleoptera
- Suborder: Polyphaga
- Infraorder: Cucujiformia
- Family: Chrysomelidae
- Subfamily: Eumolpinae
- Tribe: Eumolpini
- Genus: Antitypona; Weise, 1921

Type species
- Lamprosphaerus collaris Baly, 1859

Synonyms
- Sphaeroplacis Chevrolat in Dejean, 1836 (nomen nudum); Lamprosphaerus Baly, 1865 (nec Baly, 1859)

Genus of beetles

Antitypona is a genus of leaf beetles in the subfamily Eumolpinae. It is found in Central America and South America.

== Species ==
- Antitypona amapariensis Bechyné & Bechyné, 1961 – Brazil
- Antitypona amoena (Lefèvre, 1885) – Brazil, Trinidad
- Antitypona angulicollis (Jacoby, 1900) – Brazil
- Antitypona apicalis (Jacoby, 1881) – Mexico, Belize, Guatemala
- Antitypona apicipennis (Lefèvre, 1884) – Colombia
- Antitypona caprai Bechyné, 1957 – Peru
- Antitypona caracasa Bechyné, 1954 – Venezuela
- Antitypona cobosi Bechyné, 1954 – Brazil
- Antitypona coeruleata (Lefèvre, 1877) – Brazil, Peru, Panama
- Antitypona collaris (Baly, 1859) – Brazil
- Antitypona demerara Bechyné, 1955 – Guyana
- Antitypona discigera Bechyné, 1951 – Venezuela
- Antitypona displicita Bechyné, 1954 – Venezuela
- Antitypona diversicornis (Baly, 1878) – Brazil
- Antitypona dorsata (Baly, 1878) – Brazil
- Antitypona dorsoplagiata Bechyné, 1955 – Peru
- Antitypona ecrasia Bechyné, 1955 – Bolivia, Peru
- Antitypona egleri Bechyné & Bechyné, 1965 – Brazil
- Antitypona ephippium (Lefèvre, 1884) – Brazil
- Antitypona epiphania Bechyné, 1955 – Brazil
- Antitypona formosa Bechyné & Bechyné, 1969 – Brazil
- Antitypona fulvicornis (Jacoby, 1900) – Brazil
- Antitypona fulvimana (Jacoby, 1900) – Brazil, Suriname, French Guiana
- Antitypona fulvitarsis (Baly, 1878) – Brazil
- Antitypona generosa (Baly, 1878) – Brazil
- Antitypona gigas (Jacoby, 1881) – Peru
- Antitypona hebe (Baly, 1865)
  - Antitypona hebe hebe (Baly, 1865) – Brazil, Venezuela
  - Antitypona hebe maronica Bechyné, 1949 – French Guiana, Brazil
  - Antitypona hebe quinquepustulata (Baly, 1865) – Brazil
- Antitypona histrionalis (Lefèvre, 1884) – Colombia
- Antitypona humeralis (Jacoby, 1900) – Venezuela
- Antitypona incisella Bechyné, 1953 – Argentina
- Antitypona insularis Bechyné, 1953 – Brazil
- Antitypona ivongioides Bechyné, 1954 – Brazil
- Antitypona janthina (Lefèvre, 1885) – Colombia
- Antitypona josephina Bechyné, 1953 – Brazil
- Antitypona juengeri Bechyné, 1953 – Peru
- Antitypona kuscheli Bechyné, 1950 – Bolivia
- Antitypona lamellata Bechyné & Bechyné, 1969 – Venezuela
- Antitypona lateralis (Baly, 1865) – Brazil
- Antitypona longicornis Bechyné, 1953 – Brazil
- Antitypona louana Bechyné & Bechyné, 1976 – Brazil
- Antitypona luctuosa (Lefèvre, 1878) – Colombia
- Antitypona macacoara Bechyné & Bechyné, 1965 – Brazil
- Antitypona multicolor Weise, 1921 – Brazil
- Antitypona nitentula Bechyné, 1953 – Brazil
- Antitypona oedipoda Bechyné & Bechyné, 1976 – Venezuela
- Antitypona ornata (Lefèvre, 1885) – Brazil
- Antitypona ornaticollis Bechyné, 1951
  - Antitypona ornaticollis boliviana Bechyné, 1951 – Bolivia
  - Antitypona ornaticollis ornaticollis Bechyné, 1951 – Peru
- Antitypona plaumanni Bechyné, 1954 – Brazil
- Antitypona plumbea (Jacoby, 1890) – Mexico
- Antitypona pulchra (Baly, 1878) – Brazil
- Antitypona pusilla (Lefèvre, 1888) – Brazil, Paraguay, Argentina
- Antitypona pythia Bechyné & Bechyné, 1969 – Venezuela
- Antitypona quadrimaculata (Jacoby, 1899) – Paraguay, Brazil, Bolivia, Argentina
- Antitypona rubeola Bechyné, 1951 – Bolivia, Brazil
- Antitypona sanguinea (Fauvel, 1861) – French Guiana
- Antitypona scymnoides Bechyné, 1958 – Bolivia
- Antitypona semipurpurea (Jacoby, 1890) – Panama
- Antitypona septella Bechyné, 1951 – Bolivia
- Antitypona specularis (Baly, 1859) – Brazil
- Antitypona subcostata (Jacoby, 1881) – Colombia
- Antitypona submetallica (Jacoby, 1890) – Panama
- Antitypona tarsata (Baly, 1859) – French Guiana
- Antitypona thoa Bechyné & Bechyné, 1976 – Brazil
- Antitypona variabilis (Jacoby, 1890) – Guatemala
- Antitypona ventralis Bechyné, 1953 – Brazil
- Antitypona venusta (Lefèvre, 1885) – Colombia
- Antitypona yepezi Bechyné & Bechyné, 1967 – Venezuela
- Antitypona zeca Bechyné & Bechyné, 1965 – Brazil

Synonyms:

- Antitypona amabilis (Lefèvre, 1878): moved to Chalcoplacis
- Antitypona anthrax Bechyné, 1951: moved to Chalcoplacis
- Antitypona balyi (Lefèvre, 1885): synonym of Antitypona amoena (Lefèvre, 1885)
- Antitypona bicolora (Jacoby, 1900): moved to Chalcoplacis
- Antitypona bimaculata (Jacoby, 1900): moved to Chalcoplacis
- Antitypona confraterna Bechyné, 1951: moved to Chalcoplacis
- Antitypona dilatata Bechyné, 1950: moved to Chalcoplacis
- Antitypona dimidiata (Jacoby, 1900): moved to Hylax
- Antitypona fulgida (Lefèvre, 1885): moved to Chalcoplacis
- Antitypona minuta (Jacoby, 1881): moved to Spintherophyta
- Antitypona nicteroyensis Bechyné, 1951: moved to Chalcoplacis
- Antitypona progressa Bechyné, 1951: moved to Chalcoplacis
- Antitypona ruficeps (Baly, 1878): synonym of Antitypona hebe (Baly, 1865)
- Antitypona scintillaris (Baly, 1865): synonym of Chalcoplacis tricolor (Fauvel, 1861)
- Antitypona sulcaticeps Bechyné, 1951: moved to Chalcoplacis
