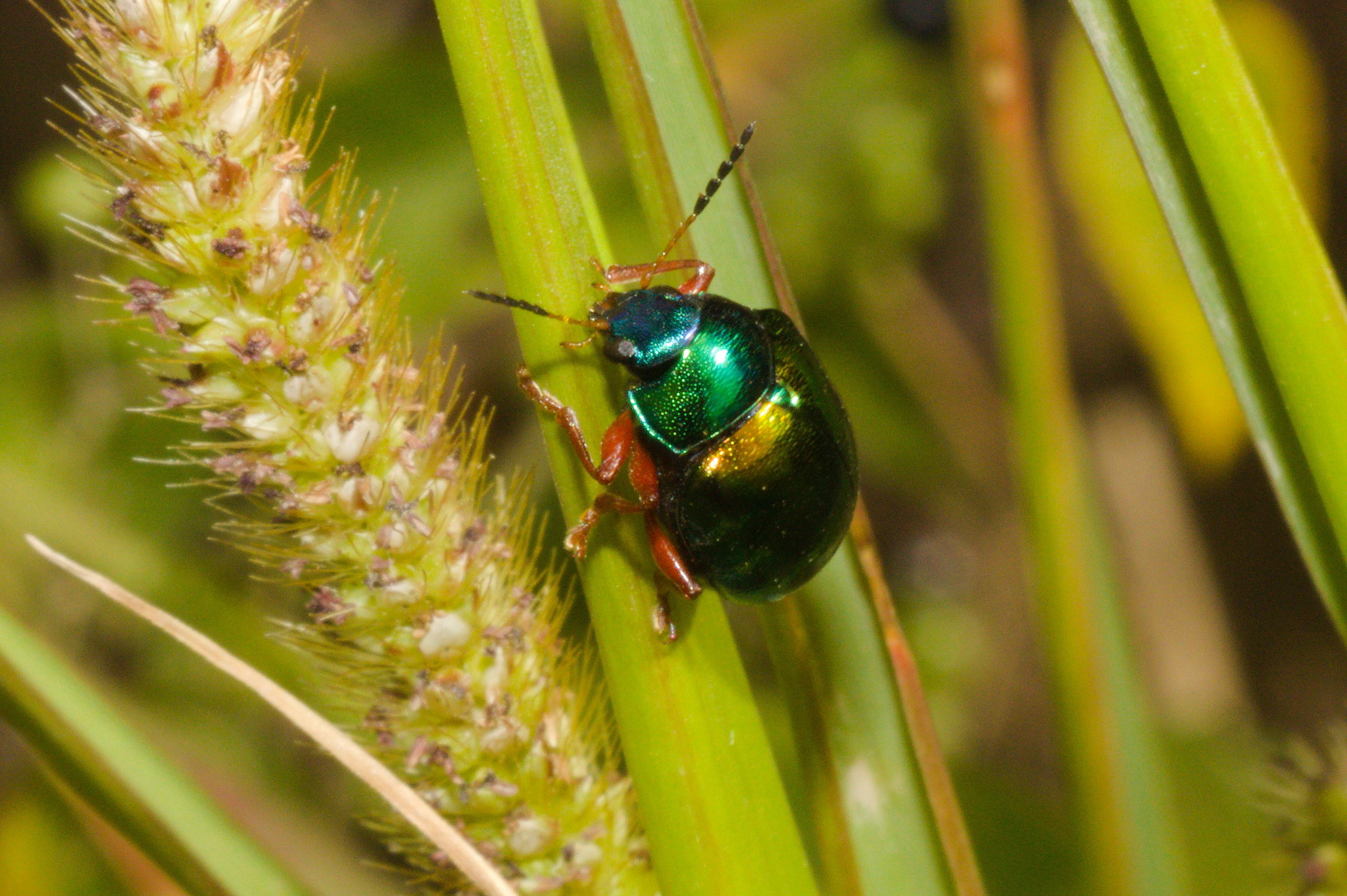
- Iphimeis dives

Scientific classification
- Kingdom: Animalia
- Phylum: Arthropoda
- Clade: Pancrustacea
- Class: Insecta
- Order: Coleoptera
- Suborder: Polyphaga
- Infraorder: Cucujiformia
- Family: Chrysomelidae
- Subfamily: Eumolpinae
- Tribe: Eumolpini
- Genus: Iphimeis; Baly, 1864

Type species
- Iphimeis fulvipes Baly, 1864

Synonyms
- Pleuraulaca Chevrolat in Dejean, 1836

= Iphimeis =

Genus of leaf beetles from South America

Iphimeis is a genus of leaf beetles in the subfamily Eumolpinae. It is known from South America.

== Species ==
- Iphimeis balyi Harold, 1874 – Brazil
- Iphimeis dives (Germar, 1824) – Brazil (Southeast and South), Paraguay, Argentina (Misiones)
- Iphimeis dubitabilis Bechyné, 1950
  - Iphimeis dubitabilis corumbae Bechyné, 1950 – Brazil (Mato Grosso)
  - Iphimeis dubitabilis dubitabilis Bechyné, 1950 – Brazil (Bahia)
- Iphimeis finalis Bechyné, 1950 – Brazil (Bahia)
- Iphimeis fulva Lefèvre, 1876 – Colombia
- Iphimeis fulvipes Baly, 1864 – Brazil (Southeast)
- Iphimeis fuscitarsis Lefèvre, 1884 – Brazil (Bahia)
- Iphimeis itataiensis Bechyné, 1953 – Brazil (Rio de Janeiro)
- Iphimeis nicki Bechyné, 1953 – Brazil (São Paulo)
- Iphimeis nigritarsis (Lefèvre, 1878) – Brazil (Rio de Janeiro)

Synonyms:

- Iphimeis deposita Bechyné, 1952: moved to Taimbezinhia
- Iphimeis erythropus Lefèvre, 1876: moved to Coytiera
- Iphimeis rugicollis Lefèvre, 1875: synonym of Iphimeis dives (Germar, 1824)
- Iphimeis speciosa Weise, 1921: moved to Chalcoplacis
