= Llanomolpus =

Scientific classification
- Kingdom: Animalia
- Phylum: Arthropoda
- Clade: Pancrustacea
- Class: Insecta
- Order: Coleoptera
- Suborder: Polyphaga
- Infraorder: Cucujiformia
- Family: Chrysomelidae
- Subfamily: Eumolpinae
- Tribe: Eumolpini
- Genus: Llanomolpus; Bechyné, 1997
- Species: L. flavidus

Binomial name
- Llanomolpus flavidus (Lefèvre, 1877)

Synonyms
- Agrosterna flavida (Lefèvre, 1877); Choris flavida Lefèvre, 1877

Genus of leaf beetles

Llanomolpus is a genus of leaf beetles in the subfamily Eumolpinae. It contains only one species, Llanomolpus flavidus, which is known from Venezuela, though it was originally described from Colombia. The genus is related to Ischyrolampra and Agrosterna. The general appearance of the species resembles Chalcoplacis fulva (now placed in Anachalcoplacis).

The genus was established by the Czech entomologist Jan Bechyně in a monograph titled "Evaluación de los datos sobre los Phytophaga dañinos en Venezuela (Coleoptera)" before his death in 1973, but the work (including the description of the genus) was unpublished until October 1997.
