= Ischyrolamprina =

Scientific classification
- Kingdom: Animalia
- Phylum: Arthropoda
- Clade: Pancrustacea
- Class: Insecta
- Order: Coleoptera
- Suborder: Polyphaga
- Infraorder: Cucujiformia
- Family: Chrysomelidae
- Subfamily: Eumolpinae
- Tribe: Eumolpini
- Genus: Ischyrolamprina; Bechyné, 1950

Type species
- Spintherophyta lampros Lefèvre, 1888

Genus of leaf beetles from South America

Ischyrolamprina is a genus of leaf beetles in the subfamily Eumolpinae. It is found in South America.

Ischyrolamprina was originally described as a subgenus of Ischyrolampra, but was later split from it as a separate genus.

== Species ==
Subgenus Ischyrolamprina Bechyné, 1950

- Ischyrolamprina fulgens (Lefèvre, 1891) – Brazil (Amazonas)
- Ischyrolamprina lampros (Lefèvre, 1888) – Brazil (North, Southeast, South), Argentina (Misiones)
- Ischyrolamprina peruana (Lefèvre, 1891) – Peru, Bolivia
- Ischyrolamprina rufitarsis (Bechyné, 1951) – Argentina (Salta), Paraguay

Subgenus Pseudoischyrolampra Bechyné, 1954

- Ischyrolamprina perla (Bechyné, 1950) – Peru
- Ischyrolamprina splendicans (Bechyné, 1950) – Bolivia
