= Cleptor =

Scientific classification
- Kingdom: Animalia
- Phylum: Arthropoda
- Clade: Pancrustacea
- Class: Insecta
- Order: Coleoptera
- Suborder: Polyphaga
- Infraorder: Cucujiformia
- Family: Chrysomelidae
- Subfamily: Eumolpinae
- Tribe: Eumolpini
- Genus: Cleptor; Lefèvre, 1885

Type species
- Cleptor inermis (= Colaspoides australis Jacoby, 1880) Lefèvre, 1885

Genus of leaf beetles from Australia

Cleptor is a genus of leaf beetles in the subfamily Eumolpinae. It is known from Australia.

== Species ==
Species include:

- Cleptor apicistriatus Lea, 1915
- Cleptor australis (Jacoby, 1880)
- Cleptor bigener Lea, 1915
- Cleptor caerulea Lea, 1915
- Cleptor chloropterus Lea, 1915
- Cleptor coriaceus Lea, 1915
- Cleptor electus Lea, 1915
- Cleptor globulus Lea, 1915
- Cleptor goudiei Lea, 1915
- Cleptor haroldi Blackburn, 1900
- Cleptor laevicollis Lea, 1915
- Cleptor minutus Lea, 1915
- Cleptor mjoebergi Weise, 1923
- Cleptor multicolor Lea, 1915
- Cleptor pallidiventris Lea, 1915
- Cleptor paradoxa (Blackburn, 1889)
- Cleptor rufimanus Lefèvre, 1885
- Cleptor semiviridis Lea, 1915
- Cleptor striatipectus Lea, 1915
- Cleptor subhumeralis Lea, 1915
- Cleptor tersus Lea, 1915
- Cleptor xanthopus (Harold, 1879)
