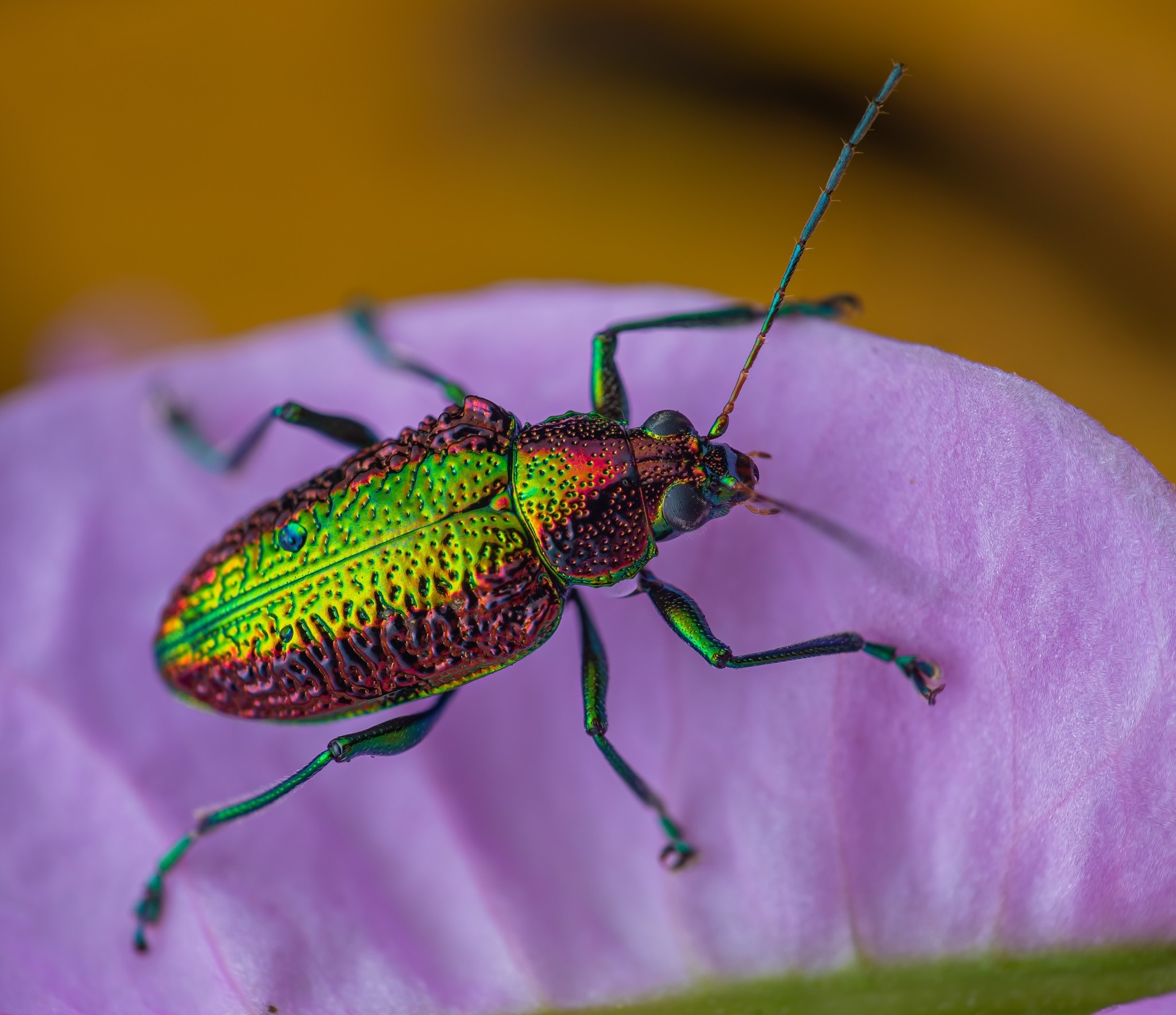
- Adorea splendida

Scientific classification
- Kingdom: Animalia
- Phylum: Arthropoda
- Clade: Pancrustacea
- Class: Insecta
- Order: Coleoptera
- Suborder: Polyphaga
- Infraorder: Cucujiformia
- Family: Chrysomelidae
- Subfamily: Eumolpinae
- Tribe: Eumolpini
- Genus: Adorea; Lefèvre, 1877

Type species
- Adorea speciosa Lefèvre, 1877

Synonyms
- Gastropius Lefèvre, 1885

= Adorea (beetle) =

Genus of leaf beetles from Central and South America

Adorea is a genus of leaf beetles in the subfamily Eumolpinae. It contains seven species, which are found in Central America and northern South America.

== Species ==
The genus contains seven species:

- Adorea bifasciata (Jacoby, 1881) – Panama
- Adorea chontalensis (Jacoby, 1881) – Nicarauga
- Adorea cruentata (Lefèvre, 1877) – Guatemala, Colombia, Venezuela
- Adorea elegans (Jacoby, 1878) – Colombia, Ecuador
- Adorea splendida (Jacoby, 1881) – Costa Rica, Panama
- Adorea speciosa Lefèvre, 1877 – Ecuador
- Adorea strongylioides (Bechyné, 1950) – Costa Rica
