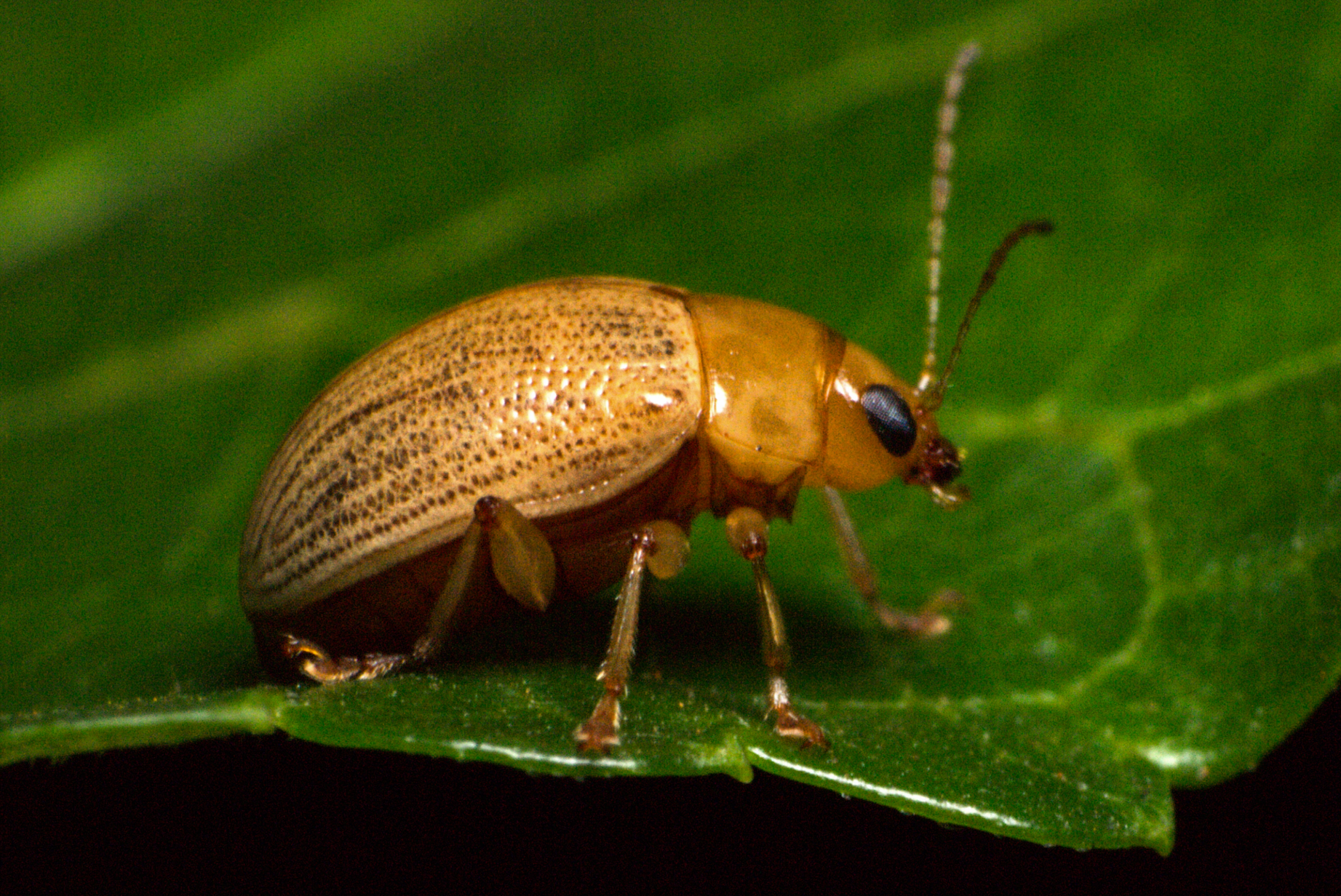
- Costalimaita ferruginea

Scientific classification
- Kingdom: Animalia
- Phylum: Arthropoda
- Clade: Pancrustacea
- Class: Insecta
- Order: Coleoptera
- Suborder: Polyphaga
- Infraorder: Cucujiformia
- Family: Chrysomelidae
- Subfamily: Eumolpinae
- Tribe: Eumolpini
- Genus: Costalimaita; Bechyné, 1954

Type species
- Colaspoides suturalis Lefèvre, 1891

= Costalimaita =

Genus of leaf beetles from South America

Costalimaita is a genus of leaf beetles in the subfamily Eumolpinae. The genus is distributed in South America. It was established by the Czech entomologist Jan Bechyné in 1954, and is dedicated to the Brazilian entomologist Ângelo Moreira da Costa Lima.

In Brazil, adults of the species C. ferruginea are commonly reported attacking and causing severe damage to eucalyptus plants of any age. They are also associated with other members of the plant family Myrtaceae.

== Species ==
Three species are included in the genus:

- Costalimaita ferruginea (Fabricius, 1801)
  - Costalimaita ferruginea ferruginea (Fabricius, 1801) – The Guianas
  - Costalimaita ferruginea proxima (Klug, 1829) – Argentina, Paraguay, Uruguay, Brazil, Bolivia, Peru
  - Costalimaita ferruginea vulgata (Lefèvre, 1885) – Brazil
- Costalimaita lurida (Lefèvre, 1891) – Brazil
- Costalimaita suturalis (Lefèvre, 1891) – Brazil
