= Hermesia =

Hermesia is the scientific name of two genera of organisms and may refer to:

- Hermesia (beetle), a genus of insects in the family Chrysomelidae
- Hermesia (plant), a genus of plants in the family Euphorbiaceae, currently considered a synonym of Alchornea
