= Ajubus =

Scientific classification
- Kingdom: Animalia
- Phylum: Arthropoda
- Clade: Pancrustacea
- Class: Insecta
- Order: Coleoptera
- Suborder: Polyphaga
- Infraorder: Cucujiformia
- Family: Chrysomelidae
- Subfamily: Eumolpinae
- Tribe: Eumolpini
- Genus: Ajubus; Aslam, 1968
- Species: A. viridis

Binomial name
- Ajubus viridis (Clark, 1865)

Synonyms
- Genus Thaumastomerus Clark, 1865 (nec Wollaston, 1861) Species Thaumastomerus viridis Clark, 1865

Genus of leaf beetles from Australia

Ajubus is a genus of leaf beetles in the subfamily Eumolpinae. It contains only one species, Ajubus viridis, described from Champion Bay in Western Australia. The genus was originally named Thaumastomerus by Hamlet Clark in 1865; however, this name was preoccupied by Thaumastomerus Wollaston, 1861 (a beetle genus in Curculionidae), so it was renamed to Ajubus by N. A. Aslam in 1968.

Clark originally described Thaumastomerus as resembling Edusa (now named Edusella), but being broader, less parallel, and the middle legs of the males having unusually thickened femora. Entomologists Félicien Chapuis and Thomas Blackburn later suggested that Thaumastomerus may not be a distinct genus from Edusa, possibly being an aberrant species of the latter.
