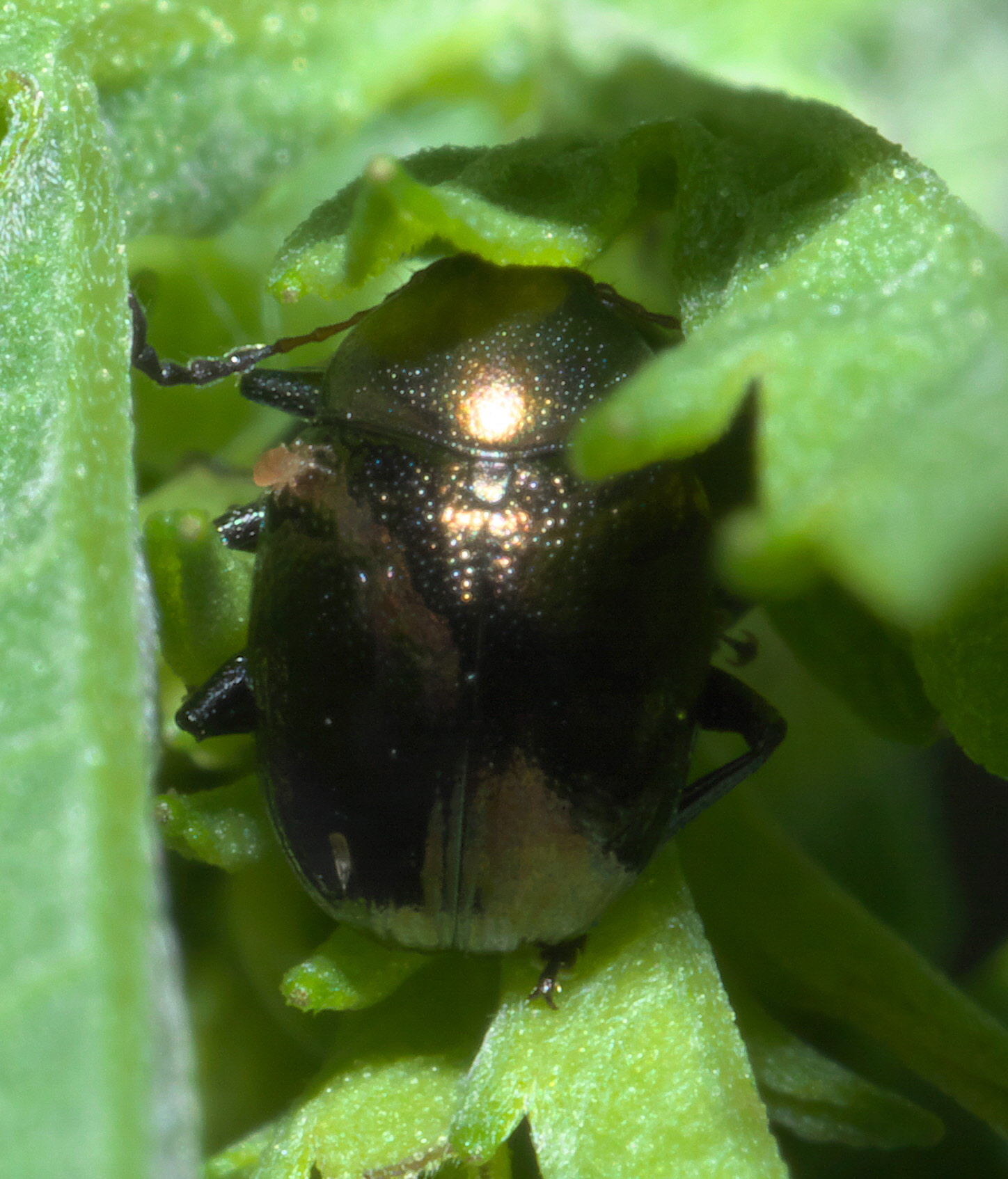
- Brachypnoea

Scientific classification
- Kingdom: Animalia
- Phylum: Arthropoda
- Clade: Pancrustacea
- Class: Insecta
- Order: Coleoptera
- Suborder: Polyphaga
- Infraorder: Cucujiformia
- Family: Chrysomelidae
- Subfamily: Eumolpinae
- Tribe: Eumolpini; Hope, 1840

Synonyms
- Chalcophanini Chapuis, 1874; Chrysodinini Lefèvre, 1885; Colaspidini Hope, 1840; Colaspoidini Chen, 1940; Corynodini Marshall, 1865; Edusellini Clavareau, 1914; Endocephalini Chapuis, 1874; Iphimeini Chapuis, 1874

= Eumolpini =

Tribe of leaf beetles

Eumolpini is a tribe of leaf beetles in the subfamily Eumolpinae. It is the largest tribe in the subfamily, with approximately 170 genera found worldwide. Members of the tribe almost always have a longitudinal median groove on the pygidium, which possibly helps to keep the elytra locked at rest. They also generally have a subglabrous body, as well as appendiculate pretarsal claws.

== Taxonomy ==
Following the leaf beetle classification of Seeno and Wilcox (1982), the genera of Eumolpini are divided into five informal groups or "sections": Corynodites, Edusites, Endocephalites, Eumolpites and Iphimeites.

In the Catalog of the leaf beetles of America North of Mexico, published in 2003, the section Myochroites of Bromiini was placed in synonymy with the section Iphimeites in Eumolpini. The North American genera Glyptoscelis and Myochrous from Myochroites were also transferred to Iphimeites.

== Genera ==
The following genera belong to the tribe Eumolpini:

Section Iphimeites:

- Acanthixus Lefèvre, 1876
- Adorea Lefèvre, 1877
- Agbalus Chapuis, 1874
- Agetinus Lefèvre, 1885
- Agrianes Chapuis, 1874
- Agrosterna Harold, 1875
- Alethaxius Lefèvre, 1885
- Alittus Chapuis, 1874
- Allocolaspis Bechyné, 1950
- Alwiunia Bechyné, 1953
- Anchieta Bechyné, 1954
- Antitypona Weise, 1921
- Apterodina Bechyné, 1954
- Aristonoda Bechyné, 1953
- Arnobiopsis Jacoby, 1896
- Atrichatus Sharp, 1886
- Balya Jacoby, 1882
- Beltia Jacoby, 1881
- Brachypnoea Gistel, 1848
- Callicolaspis Bechyné, 1950
- Caudatomolpus Bechyné, 1953
- Cayetunya Bechyné, 1958
- Chalcophana Chevrolat in Dejean, 1836
- Chalcophyma Baly, 1865
- Chalcoplacis Chevrolat in Dejean, 1836
- Chrysodinopsis Bechyné, 1950
- Chrysolampra Baly, 1859
- Clisithera Baly, 1864
- Colaspis Fabricius, 1801
- Corumbaea Bechyné, 1954
- Corysthea Baly, 1865
- Costalimaita Bechyné, 1954
- Coytiera Lefèvre, 1875
- Cudnellia Blackburn, 1889
- Cylindromela Weise, 1916
- Deuteragbalus Bechyné, 1949
- Deuteronoda Bechyné, 1951
- Diacolaspis Bechyné, 1950
- Dolichenus Lefèvre, 1885
- Dorysternoides Bechyné & Bechyné, 1967
- Drakhshandus Aslam, 1968
- Entomochirus Lefèvre, 1884
- Ephyraea Lefèvre, 1889
- Epiphyma Baly, 1860
- Eucampylochira Bechyné, 1951
- Eucolaspinus Lea, 1916
- Eucolaspis Sharp, 1886
- Eupetale Flowers, 2021
- Euphrytus Jacoby, 1881
- Eurysarcus Lefèvre, 1885
- Exochognathus Blake, 1946
- Fractipes Bechyné, 1950
- Frenais Jacoby, 1903
- Freudeita Bechyné, 1950
- Freycolaspis Scherer, 1964
- Geloptera Baly, 1861
- Glyptoscelis Chevrolat in Dejean, 1836 (formerly in Adoxini)
- Guyanica Chevrolat in Dejean, 1836
- Hermesia Lefèvre, 1877
- Hermesilla Bechyné, 1954
- Hylax Lefèvre, 1884
- Hypoderes Lefèvre, 1877
- Iphimeis Baly, 1864
- Iphimoides Jacoby, 1883
- Iphimolpus Bechyné, 1949
- Ischyrolampra Lefèvre, 1885
- Ischyrolamprina Bechyné, 1950
- Isolepronota Bechyné, 1949
- Itatiaya Bechyné, 1953
- Kimberleya Weise, 1916
- Lamprosphaerus Baly, 1859
- Ledesmodina Bechyné, 1951
- Leprocolaspis Bechyné, 1951
- Lepronota Chapuis, 1874
- Louisdesartsia Bechyné, 1955
- Lyraletes Bechyné, 1952
- Metaparia Crotch, 1873
- Metaxyonycha Chevrolat in Dejean, 1836
- Microaletes Bechyné, 1954
- Monrosiella Bechyné, 1945
- Murimolpus Bechyné, 1950
- Myochrous Erichson, 1847 (formerly in Adoxini)
- Neoiphimeis Bechyné, 1954
- Neovianaeta Bechyné, 1954
- Nodocolaspis Bechyné, 1949
- Nodonotopsis Bechyné, 1949
- Noriaia Bechyné, 1954
- Nycterodina Bechyné, 1951
- Otilea Lefèvre, 1877
- Peniticus Sharp, 1876
- Percolaspis Bechyné, 1957
- Philippimolpus Monrós, 1952
- Pilacolaspis Sharp, 1886
- Plastonothus Lefèvre, 1884
- Plaumannita Bechyné, 1954
- Podocolaspis Bechyné, 1953
- Podoxenus Lefèvre, 1877
- Prionodera Chevrolat in Dejean, 1836
- Promecosoma Lefèvre, 1877
- Pseudochoris Jacoby, 1890
- Pubicolaspis Bechyné, 1954
- Pygocolaspis Bechyné, 1950
- Rhabdocolaspis Bechyné, 1953
- Rhabdopterus Lefèvre, 1877
- Rhinobolus Blackburn, 1889
- Ruffoita Bechyné, 1950
- Schizonoda Bechyné, 1950
- Sibotes Lefèvre, 1885
- Spintherophyta Dejean, 1836
- Stereonoda Bechyné, 1951
- Sterneurus Lefèvre, 1875
- Sternocolaspis Bechyné, 1950
- Stylomolpus Bechyné, 1953
- Sybriacosoma Jacoby, 1895
- Taimbezinhia Bechyné, 1954
- Talurus Lefèvre, 1889
- Tectaletes Bechyné, 1953
- Terillus Chapuis, 1874
- Theocolaspis Bechyné, 1953
- Therses Jacoby, 1890
- Tomecolaspis Weise, 1923
- Tymnes Chapuis, 1874
- Vianaeta Bechyné, 1949
- Vinsoneumolpus Bechyné, 1957
- Wittmerita Bechyné, 1950
- Xanthopachys Baly, 1864
- Zenocolaspis Bechyné, 1997

Section Eumolpites:

- Eumolpus Weber, 1801
- Longeumolpus Springlova, 1960

Section Edusites:

- Abiromorphus Pic, 1924
- Abirus Chapuis, 1874
- Ajubus Aslam, 1968
- Argoa Lefèvre, 1885
- Arsoa Fairmaire, 1901
- Auranius Jacoby, 1881
- Australotymnes Flowers, 2009
- Cleptor Lefèvre, 1885
- Colaspedusa Medvedev, 1998
- Dematochroma Baly, 1864
- Dermorhytis Baly, 1861
- Diplasiaca Weise, 1923
- Edusella Chapuis, 1874
- Edusoides Blackburn, 1889
- Glyptosceloides Askevold & Flowers, 1994
- Lepronida Baly, 1864
- Megasceloides Jacoby, 1898
- Pseudabirus Fairmaire, 1897
- Pseudedusia Jacoby, 1898
- Ocnida Lefèvre, 1885
- Sphaeropis Lefèvre, 1876
- Taophila Heller, 1916

Section Corynodites:

- Chrysochares Morawitz, 1861
- Chrysochus Chevrolat in Dejean, 1836
- Erotenia Lefèvre, 1884
- Malayocorynus Medvedev, 2004
- Platycorynus Chevrolat in Dejean, 1836

Section Endocephalites:

- †Acolaspoides Moseyko, Kirejtshuk & Nel, 2010
- Aemnestus Jacoby, 1908
- Aulacia Baly, 1867
- Colaspoides Laporte, 1833
- Dermoxanthus Baly, 1859
- Durangoita Bechyné, 1958
- Endocephalus Chevrolat in Dejean, 1836
- Endoschyrus Jacoby, 1901
- Heminodes Jacoby, 1895
- Massiea Lefèvre, 1893
- Megalocolaspoides Medvedev, 2005
- Melinodea Jacoby, 1900
- Olorus Chapuis, 1874
- Phanaeta Lefèvre, 1878
- Pseudocolaspoides Medvedev, 2005
- Susteraia Bechyné, 1950
- Thyra Lefèvre, 1875
- Thysanomeros Flowers, 2003
- Trichocolaspis Medvedev, 2005
- Vieteumolpus Medvedev, 2004

Genera not placed in a section:

- Acronymolpus Samuelson, 2015
- Aksakidion Flowers, 2023
- Anachalcoplacis B. Bechyné, 1983
- Cazeresia Jolivet, Verma & Mille, 2005
- Colaspinella Weise, 1893
- Dematotrichus Gómez-Zurita, 2022
- Dryadomolpus Bechyné & Bechyné, 1969
- Dumbea Jolivet, Verma & Mille, 2007
- †Eocenocolaspis Bukejs, Moseyko & Alekseev, 2022
- Eulepton Riley, 2019
- Kumatoeides Gómez-Zurita, 2018
- Llanomolpus Bechyné, 1997
- Marajoarinha B. Bechyné, 1983
- Montrouzierella Jolivet, Verma & Mille, 2007
- †Paleomolpus Nadein, 2015
- Prionoderita Flowers, 2004
- Samuelsonia Jolivet, Verma & Mille, 2007
- Thasycles Chapuis, 1874
- Tricholapita Gómez-Zurita & Cardoso, 2020
- Tyrannomolpus Nadein & Leschen, 2017

The genus Megascelis Latreille, 1825, which is traditionally placed in the tribe Megascelidini, is also included in the Eumolpini according to ITIS.

== Gallery ==
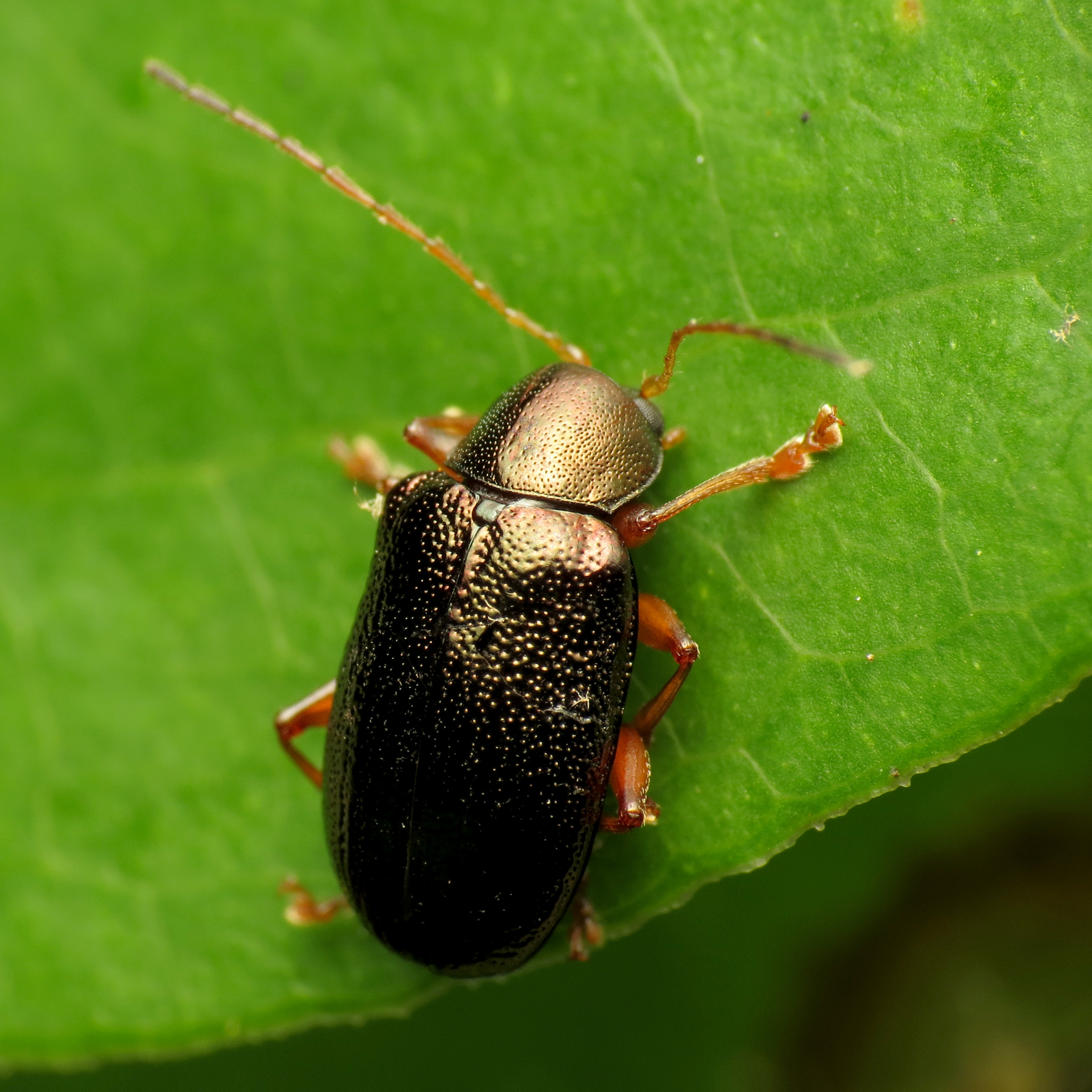
Tymnes

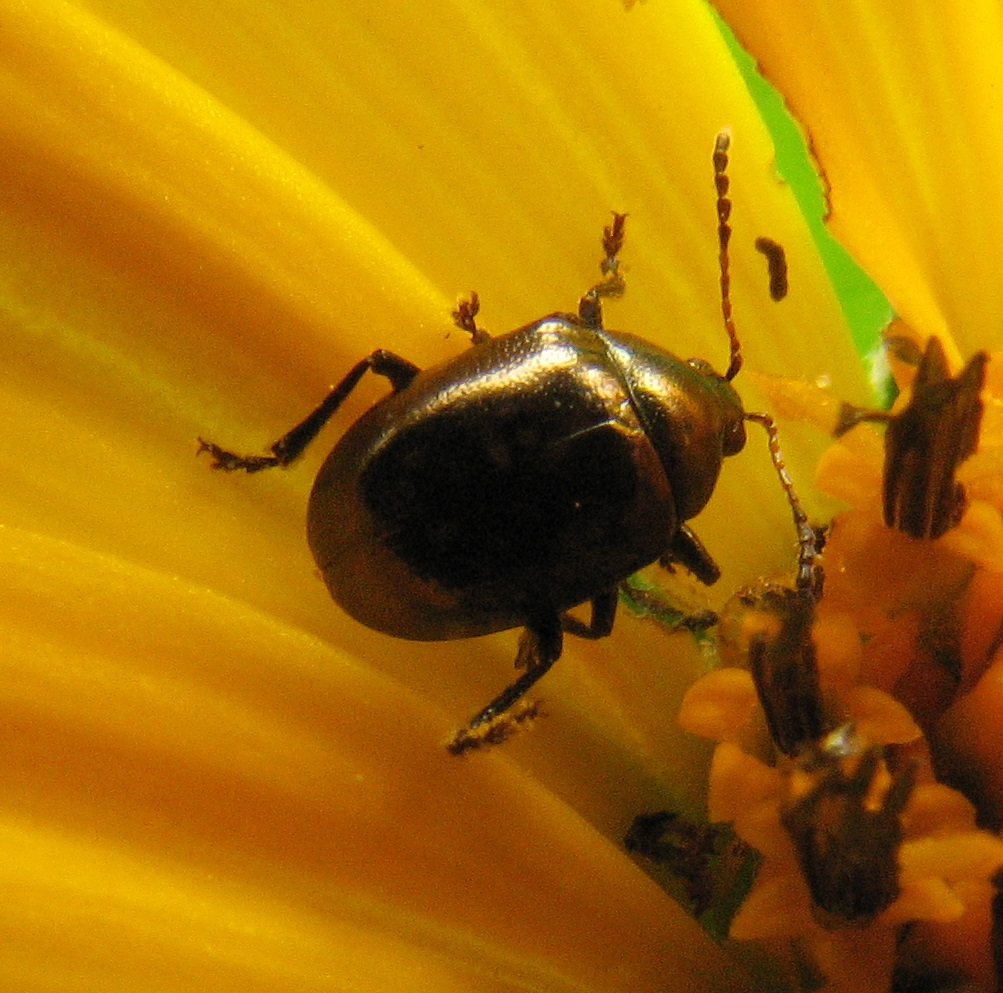
Brachypnoea sp.

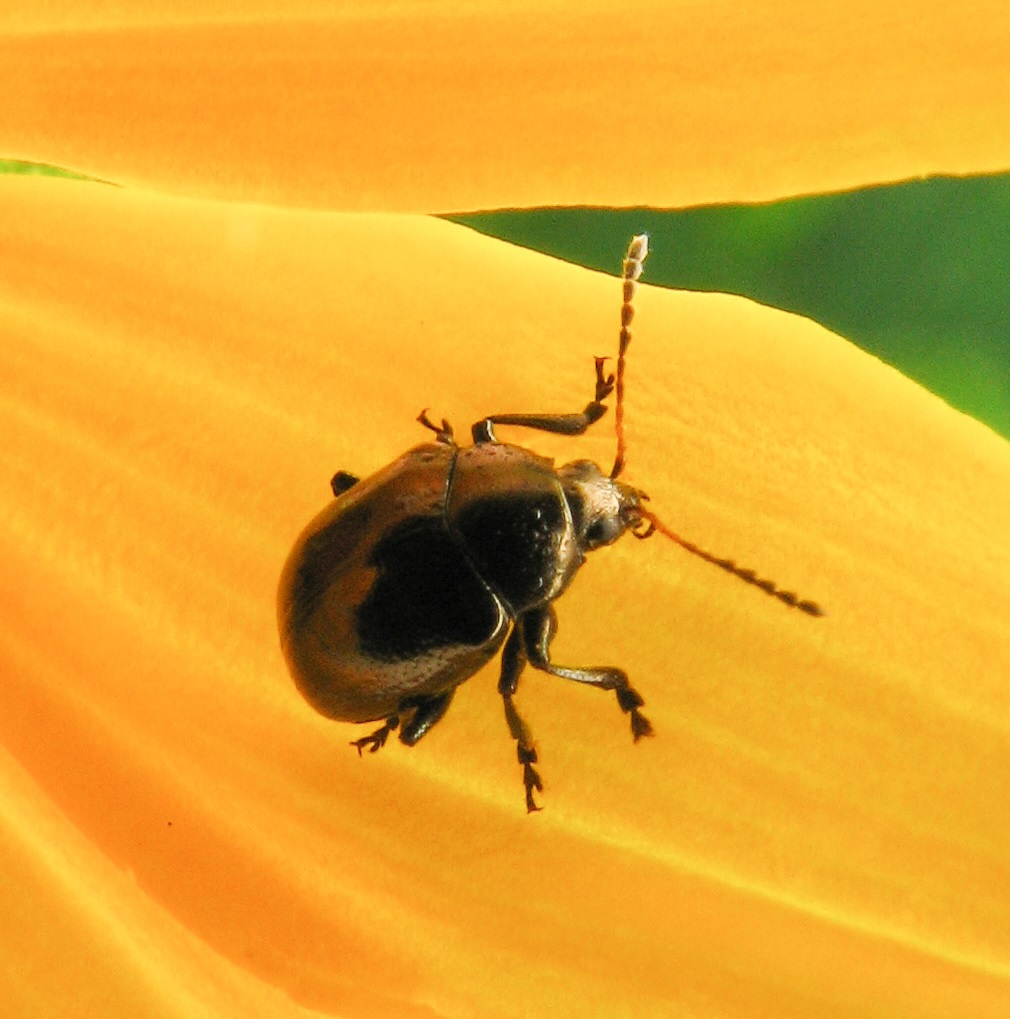
Brachypnoea puncticollis (Rose Leaf Beetle)

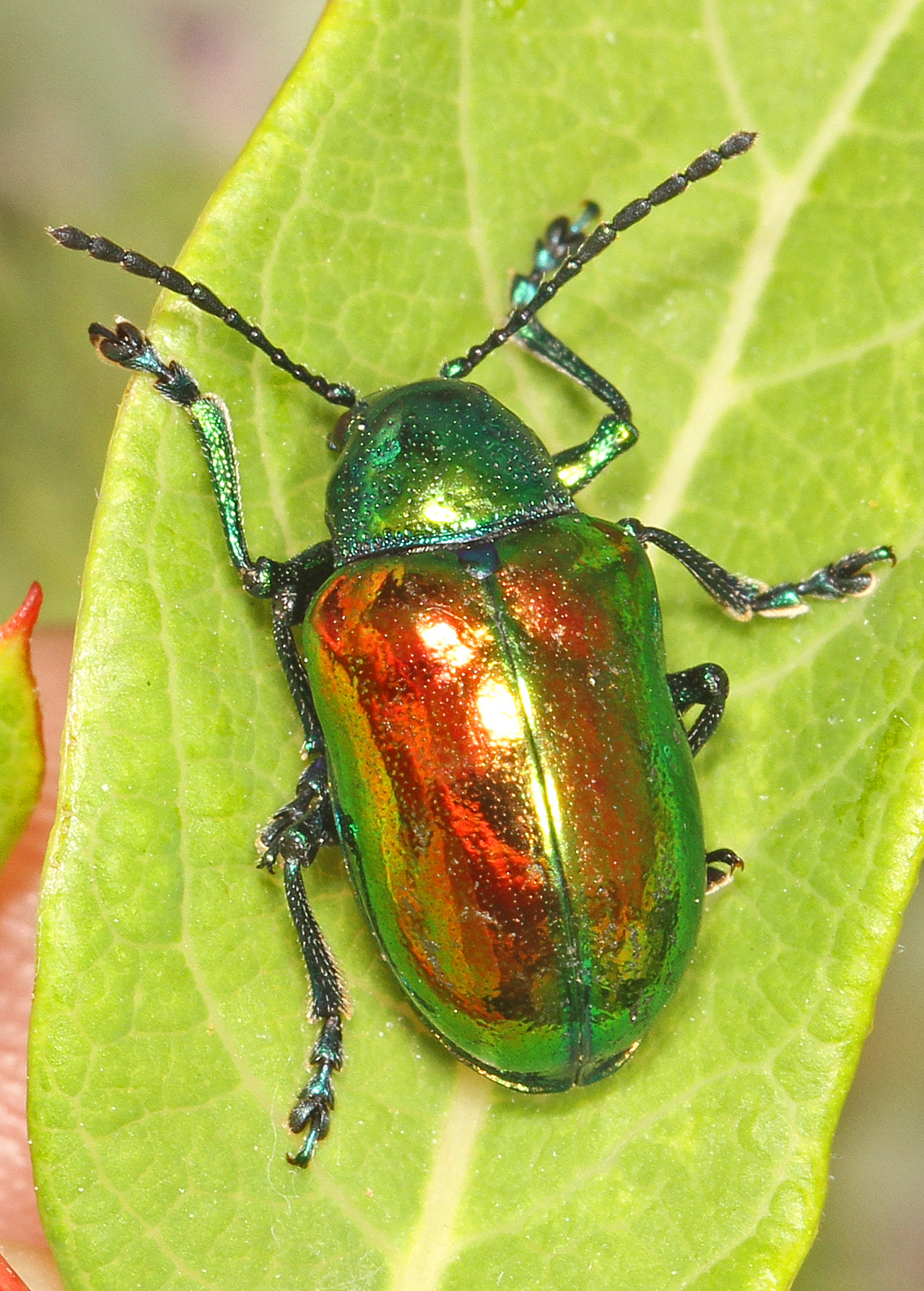
Chrysochus auratus
