= Montrouzierella =

Scientific classification
- Kingdom: Animalia
- Phylum: Arthropoda
- Clade: Pancrustacea
- Class: Insecta
- Order: Coleoptera
- Suborder: Polyphaga
- Infraorder: Cucujiformia
- Family: Chrysomelidae
- Subfamily: Eumolpinae
- Tribe: Eumolpini
- Genus: Montrouzierella; Jolivet, Verma & Mille, 2007

Type species
- Montrouzierella nana Jolivet, Verma & Mille, 2007

Genus of leaf beetles from New Caledonia

Montrouzierella is a genus of leaf beetles in the subfamily Eumolpinae. It is known from the South Province and Mont Panié of New Caledonia, and is named after Xavier Montrouzier, the pioneer entomologist of New Caledonia. The genus was established based on general proportions and body size, and may be polyphyletic or paraphyletic.

== Species ==
- Montrouzierella brinoni Jolivet, Verma & Mille, 2007
- Montrouzierella flava Jolivet, Verma & Mille, 2007
- Montrouzierella metrosiderosi Jolivet, Verma & Mille, 2011
- Montrouzierella nana Jolivet, Verma & Mille, 2007
- Montrouzierella subtuberculata Jolivet, Verma & Mille, 2010
- Montrouzierella tuberculata Jolivet, Verma & Mille, 2007

The following species have been transferred to other genera:

- Montrouzierella costata Jolivet, Verma & Mille, 2007: transferred to Kumatoeides
- Montrouzierella hispida Jolivet, Verma & Mille, 2013: transferred to Dematotrichus
