= Alethaxius =

Scientific classification
- Kingdom: Animalia
- Phylum: Arthropoda
- Clade: Pancrustacea
- Class: Insecta
- Order: Coleoptera
- Suborder: Polyphaga
- Infraorder: Cucujiformia
- Family: Chrysomelidae
- Subfamily: Eumolpinae
- Tribe: Eumolpini
- Genus: Alethaxius; Lefèvre, 1885

Type species
- Aletes angulicollis Chapuis, 1874

Synonyms
- Aletes Chapuis, 1874 (nec Carpenter, 1857)

Genus of leaf beetles

Alethaxius is a genus of leaf beetles in the subfamily Eumolpinae. It is distributed from Mexico to northern South America, and it is also found in the West Indies. The genus was originally named Aletes by Félicien Chapuis in 1874. However, this name was preoccupied by Aletes Carpenter, 1857 (in Mollusca), so the genus was renamed to Alethaxius by Édouard Lefèvre in 1885. According to Flowers (1996), it is very likely that Alethaxius is polyphyletic and represents at least three different genera.

== Species ==
- Alethaxius acunai Blake, 1947 – Cuba
- Alethaxius aeneus Bowditch, 1921 – Ecuador
- Alethaxius angulicollis (Chapuis, 1874) – Colombia
- Alethaxius annulicornis (Lefèvre, 1878) – Colombia
- Alethaxius bogotanus (Lefèvre, 1878) – Colombia
- Alethaxius bruneri Blake, 1949 – Cuba
- Alethaxius callosicollis Bechyné, 1953 – Colombia
- Alethaxius chevrolati (Lefèvre, 1891) – Dominican Republic
- Alethaxius carinipennis Bowditch, 1921 – Ecuador
- Alethaxius darlingtoni Blake, 1945 – Dominican Republic
- Alethaxius dichrous (Lefèvre, 1878) – Colombia
- Alethaxius dominicae Blake, 1968 – Dominica
- Alethaxius geniculatus Lefèvre, 1885 – Ecuador
- Alethaxius guatemalensis (Jacoby, 1881) – Guatemala
- Alethaxius hispaniolae Blake, 1945 – Dominican Republic
- Alethaxius integer Blake, 1945 – Dominican Republic
- Alethaxius intricatus (Lefèvre, 1878) – Colombia
- Alethaxius jacobyi Weise, 1913 – Colombia
- Alethaxius landolti (Lefèvre, 1878) – Colombia
- Alethaxius latericostatus (Lefèvre, 1882) – Ecuador
- Alethaxius marcuzzii Bechyné, 1958 – Venezuela
- Alethaxius meliae Blake, 1945 – Puerto Rico
- Alethaxius mexicanus (Jacoby, 1881) – Mexico
- Alethaxius nigritarsis Jacoby, 1892 – Ecuador
- Alethaxius pallidus Bowditch, 1921 – Ecuador
- Alethaxius parumpunctatus Bechyné, 1953 – Colombia
- Alethaxius polychromus Bechyné, 1955 – Colombia
- Alethaxius prolixus Lefèvre, 1885 – Colombia
- Alethaxius pubicollis Jacoby, 1890 – Mexico
- Alethaxius puertoricensis Blake, 1945 – Puerto Rico
- Alethaxius punctifer Bechyné, 1953 – Colombia
- Alethaxius ruffoi Bechyné, 1950 – Brazil (Rio de Janeiro)
- Alethaxius semicostatus Blake, 1946 – Puerto Rico
- Alethaxius semiviridis Jacoby, 1890 – Mexico
- Alethaxius striatulus Lefèvre, 1886 – Colombia
- Alethaxius tortuensis Blake, 1947 – Tortuga
- Alethaxius tuberculifer Lefèvre, 1889 – Mexico
- Alethaxius turquinensis Blake, 1945 – Cuba
- Alethaxius vagabundus (Lefèvre, 1878) – Colombia
- Alethaxius variabilis (Jacoby, 1881) – Colombia
- Alethaxius yunquensis Blake, 1946 – Puerto Rico

Synonyms:

- Alethaxius brevis Lefèvre, 1889: Moved to Dryadomolpus
- Alethaxius columbicus Jacoby, 1901: Moved to Rhabdocolaspis
