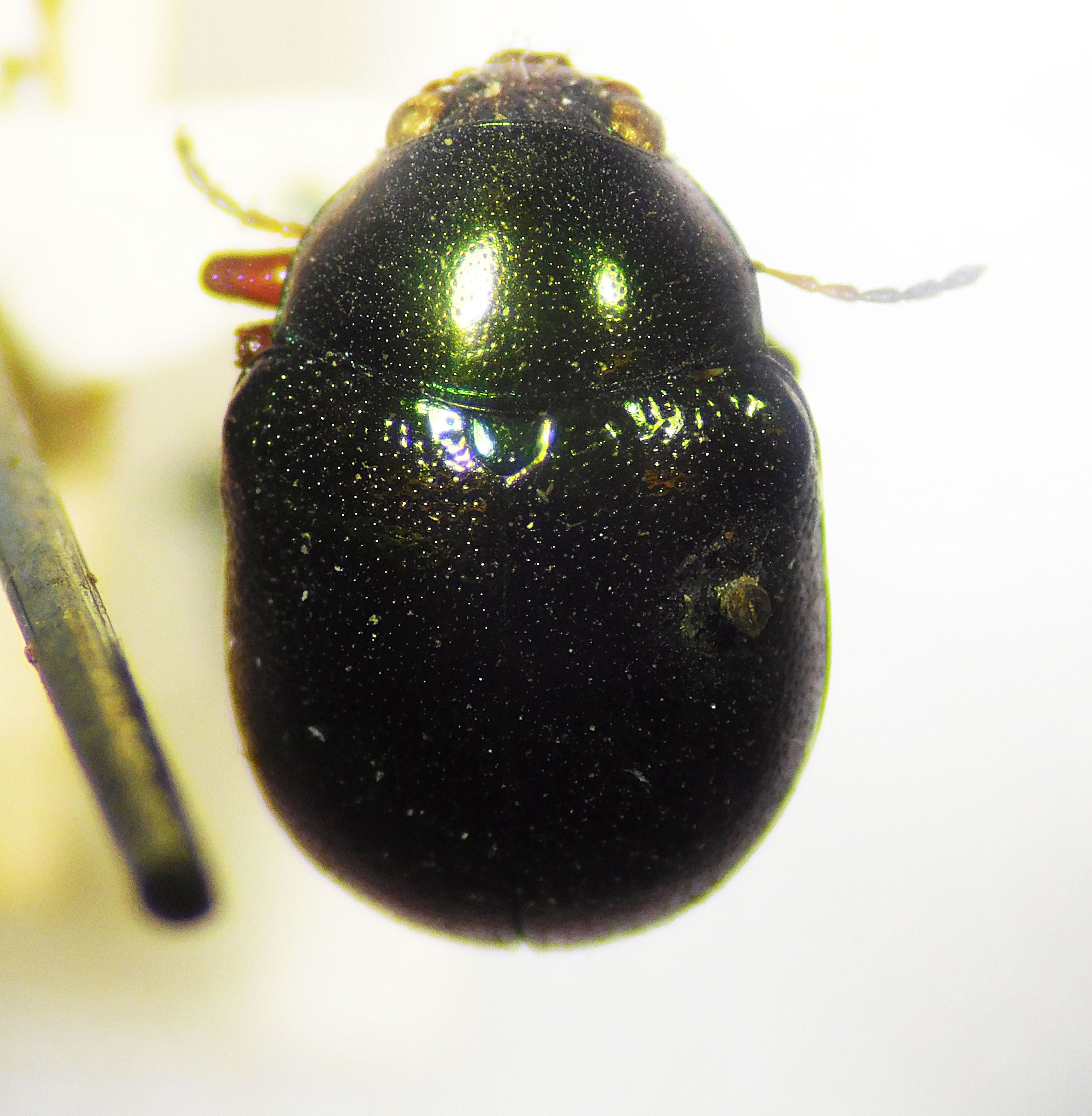
- Sterneurus balyi

Scientific classification
- Kingdom: Animalia
- Phylum: Arthropoda
- Clade: Pancrustacea
- Class: Insecta
- Order: Coleoptera
- Suborder: Polyphaga
- Infraorder: Cucujiformia
- Family: Chrysomelidae
- Subfamily: Eumolpinae
- Tribe: Eumolpini
- Genus: Sterneurus; Lefèvre, 1875

Type species
- Sterneurus fulgidus Lefèvre, 1875

= Sterneurus =

Genus of leaf beetles

Sterneurus is a genus of leaf beetles in the subfamily Eumolpinae. It is distributed in South America.

== Species ==
Species in the genus include:

- Sterneurus balyi Bechyné, 1957 – Brazil (Amazonas)
- Sterneurus berylinus Bechyné, 1951 – Brazil (São Paulo)
- Sterneurus fulgidus Lefèvre, 1875 – Brazil (São Paulo, Minas Gerais, Rio de Janeiro)
- Sterneurus lateralis Lefèvre, 1875 – Brazil (Bahia)
- Sterneurus penetrans Bechyné, 1957 – Peru
- Sterneurus viridicatus Bechyné, 1957 – Brazil (Bahia)
