= Lamprosphaerus =

Scientific classification
- Kingdom: Animalia
- Phylum: Arthropoda
- Clade: Pancrustacea
- Class: Insecta
- Order: Coleoptera
- Suborder: Polyphaga
- Infraorder: Cucujiformia
- Family: Chrysomelidae
- Subfamily: Eumolpinae
- Tribe: Eumolpini
- Genus: Lamprosphaerus; Baly, 1859

Type species
- Lamprosphaerus abdominalis Baly, 1859

Synonyms
- Chalcoplacis Baly, 1865 (nec Chevrolat in Dejean, 1836); Phaedra Chapuis, 1874 (nec Horsfield, 1829); Phaedrias Lefèvre, 1885

Genus of leaf beetles from Central and South America

Lamprosphaerus is a genus of leaf beetles in the subfamily Eumolpinae. It is found in Central America and South America.

== Species ==
- Lamprosphaerus abdominalis Baly, 1859
- Lamprosphaerus aerosus Weise, 1921
- Lamprosphaerus alternatus (Baly, 1878)
- Lamprosphaerus brevicornis (Jacoby, 1890)
- Lamprosphaerus buckleyi (Jacoby, 1881)
- Lamprosphaerus chapuisi (Jacoby, 1890)
- Lamprosphaerus coccinellinus Bechyné, 1950
- Lamprosphaerus constitutus (Bechyné, 1950)
- Lamprosphaerus dives (Lefèvre, 1877)
- Lamprosphaerus elephas (Baly, 1878)
- Lamprosphaerus femininus Bechyné, 1950
- Lamprosphaerus femoratus (Baly, 1878)
- Lamprosphaerus fulvipes (Jacoby, 1881)
- Lamprosphaerus fulvitarsis (Jacoby, 1890)
- Lamprosphaerus gigas (Jacoby, 1897)
- Lamprosphaerus gloriosus (Lefèvre, 1876)
- Lamprosphaerus granarius (Erichson, 1847)
- Lamprosphaerus hirticollis (Baly, 1878)
- Lamprosphaerus ingenuus (Baly, 1878)
- Lamprosphaerus jacobyi Bechyné, 1953
- Lamprosphaerus maximus (Lefèvre, 1875)
- Lamprosphaerus mexicanus (Jacoby, 1890)
- Lamprosphaerus nitidicollis (Baly, 1878)
- Lamprosphaerus opacicollis (Lefèvre, 1875)
- Lamprosphaerus oribocanus Bechyné & Bechyné, 1961
- Lamprosphaerus plagioderoides Bechyné, 1955
- Lamprosphaerus regina Bechyné, 1950
- Lamprosphaerus rufipes (Chapuis, 1874)
- Lamprosphaerus rufiventris (Erichson, 1847)
- Lamprosphaerus similis Bechyné, 1950
- Lamprosphaerus sumptuosus (Baly, 1865)
- Lamprosphaerus virens Bechyné, 1950
