= Agetinus =

Scientific classification
- Kingdom: Animalia
- Phylum: Arthropoda
- Clade: Pancrustacea
- Class: Insecta
- Order: Coleoptera
- Suborder: Polyphaga
- Infraorder: Cucujiformia
- Family: Chrysomelidae
- Subfamily: Eumolpinae
- Tribe: Eumolpini
- Genus: Agetinus; Lefèvre, 1885

Type species
- Agetus subcostatus Chapuis, 1874

Synonyms
- Agetus Chapuis, 1874 (nec Kröyer, 1849)

Genus of leaf beetles from Australia

Agetinus is a genus of leaf beetles in the subfamily Eumolpinae. It is known from Australia. The genus was originally named Agetus by Félicien Chapuis in 1874. However, the name Agetus was preoccupied by Agetus Kröyer, 1849 (in Crustacea), so the genus was renamed to Agetinus by Édouard Lefèvre in 1885.

== Species ==
- Agetinus abjectus Lea, 1915
- Agetinus admirabilis Lea, 1915
- Agetinus aequalis Blackburn, 1889
- Agetinus australis (Boisduval, 1835)
- Agetinus cacozelus Lea, 1915
- Agetinus cicatricosus Lea, 1915
- Agetinus compositus Lea, 1915
- Agetinus confluens Lea, 1915
- Agetinus corinthius (Boisduval, 1835)
- Agetinus croesus Lea, 1915
- Agetinus hackeri Lea, 1915
- Agetinus juvencus Lea, 1915
- Agetinus nitidivirgatus Lea, 1915
- Agetinus obliquus Lea, 1915
- Agetinus subcostata (Chapuis, 1874)
