= Massiea =

Scientific classification
- Kingdom: Animalia
- Phylum: Arthropoda
- Clade: Pancrustacea
- Class: Insecta
- Order: Coleoptera
- Suborder: Polyphaga
- Infraorder: Cucujiformia
- Family: Chrysomelidae
- Subfamily: Eumolpinae
- Tribe: Eumolpini
- Genus: Massiea; Lefèvre, 1893

Type species
- Massiea cyanipennis Lefèvre, 1893

Synonyms
- Tillopsis Berlioz, 1917; Laoseumolpus Pic, 1935; Abirellus Chûjô, 1956

Genus of leaf beetles

Massiea is a genus of leaf beetles in the subfamily Eumolpinae. It is known from East and Southeast Asia.

== Species ==
- Massiea bacboensis Medvedev, 2018 – Vietnam
- Massiea chouioi (Chen, 1940) – Southwest China (Sichuan)
- Massiea cinnamomi (Chen & Wang, 1976) – Southwest China (Yunnan)
- Massiea costata (Chen & Wang, 1976) – Southwest China (Yunnan)
- Massiea cribrata (Chen, 1940) – Southwest China (Sichuan, Chongqing)
- Massiea cyanipennis Lefèvre, 1893 – Laos
- Massiea cylindrica (Chûjô, 1938) – Taiwan
- Massiea glabrata (Tan, 1982) – Southwest China (Yunnan)
- Massiea gracilis (Chen, 1940) – Southwest China (Yunnan)
- Massiea sangzhiensis (Tan, 1992) – Central China (Hunan)
- Massiea splendida (Tan, 1992) – Central China (Hunan)
