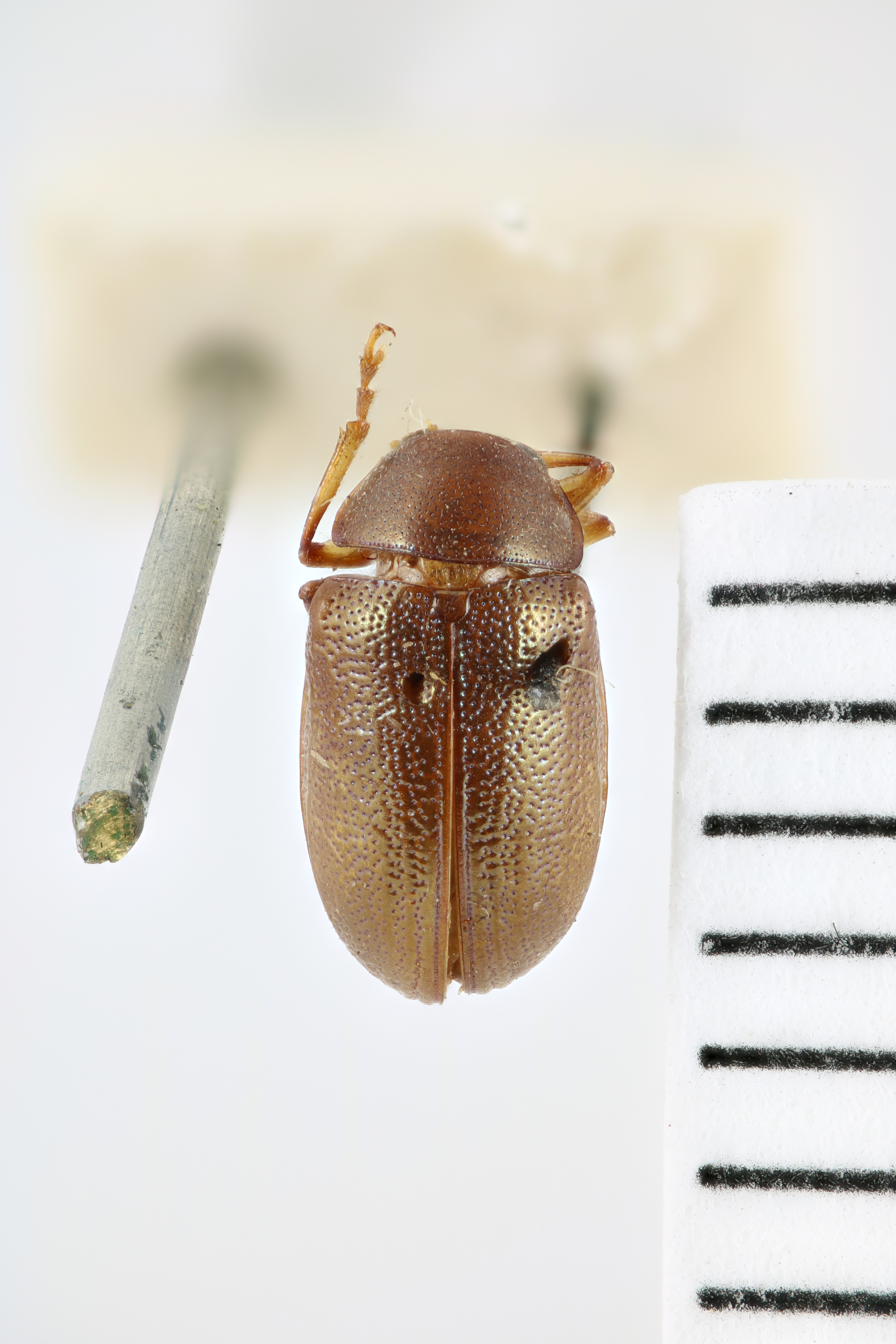
- Syntype of Coytiera aenea, housed in the Natural History Museum, London

Scientific classification
- Kingdom: Animalia
- Phylum: Arthropoda
- Clade: Pancrustacea
- Class: Insecta
- Order: Coleoptera
- Suborder: Polyphaga
- Infraorder: Cucujiformia
- Family: Chrysomelidae
- Subfamily: Eumolpinae
- Tribe: Eumolpini
- Genus: Coytiera; Lefèvre, 1875

Type species
- Coytiera marginicollis Lefèvre, 1875

= Coytiera =

Genus of leaf beetles

Coytiera is a genus of leaf beetles in the subfamily Eumolpinae. It is distributed in South America.

== Species ==
Subgenus Coytiera Lefèvre, 1875

- Coytiera aenea Jacoby, 1900 – Colombia
- Coytiera bokermanni Scherer, 1964 – Brazil
- Coytiera dimorpha (Bechyné, 1950) – Brazil
- Coytiera erythropus (Lefèvre, 1876) – Brazil
- Coytiera grandis (Bechyné, 1950) – Argentina
- Coytiera hayekaeana Bechyné, 1955 – Ecuador
- Coytiera latefasciata Jacoby, 1899 – Paraguay
- Coytiera marginicollis Lefèvre, 1875 – French Guiana, Brazil
- Coytiera nobilitata (Lefèvre, 1884) – Brazil
- Coytiera strigatipennis Lefèvre, 1885 – Brazil

Subgenus Campylochira Lefèvre, 1876 (Type species: Coytiera pectoralis (Lefèvre, 1876))

- Coytiera auropunctata (Lefèvre, 1878) – Brazil
- Coytiera bipleuralis (Bechyné, 1950) – Brazil
- Coytiera egena (Lefèvre, 1884) – Brazil
- Coytiera erratica (Lefèvre, 1891) – Argentina
- Coytiera eupulchella (Bechyné, 1950) – Brazil
- Coytiera fortepunctata Bechyné, 1950 – Brazil
- Coytiera freyi Bechyné, 1951 – Brazil
- Coytiera fryella Bechyné, 1950 – Brazil
- Coytiera fulvipes (Lefèvre, 1876)
  - Coytiera fulvipes fulvimana (Lefèvre, 1877) – Venezuela, Colombia
  - Coytiera fulvipes fulvipes (Lefèvre, 1876) – Brazil
- Coytiera gounellei (Lefèvre, 1888) – Brazil
- Coytiera guarujensis Bechyné, 1954 – Brazil
- Coytiera impertinens Bechyné, 1950 – Brazil
- Coytiera laferteana Bechyné, 1950 – Brazil
- Coytiera metallica Lefèvre, 1885 – Brazil
- Coytiera pectoralis (Lefèvre, 1876) – Brazil
- Coytiera pertusa (Lefèvre, 1884) – Brazil
- Coytiera pohli Bechyné, 1954 – Brazil
- Coytiera pygodonta Bechyné, 1950 – Brazil
- Coytiera scintillans (Bechyné, 1950) – Brazil
- Coytiera strigosa (Lefèvre, 1878) – Brazil
- Coytiera subrecta (Bechyné, 1950) – Brazil
- Coytiera theobromae (Bechyné, 1950) – Brazil
- Coytiera zikani (Bechyné, 1950) – Brazil

Synonyms:

- Coytiera costata Jacoby, 1890: moved to Euphrytus
- Coytiera fulvipes Jacoby, 1881: moved to Euphrytus
- Coytiera melancholica (Jacoby, 1881): moved to Freudeita, later moved back to Colaspis
- Coytiera rugipennis Jacoby, 1881: moved to Euphrytus
