= Ledesmodina =

Scientific classification
- Kingdom: Animalia
- Phylum: Arthropoda
- Clade: Pancrustacea
- Class: Insecta
- Order: Coleoptera
- Suborder: Polyphaga
- Infraorder: Cucujiformia
- Family: Chrysomelidae
- Subfamily: Eumolpinae
- Tribe: Eumolpini
- Genus: Ledesmodina; Bechyné, 1951

Type species
- Ledesmodina monrosi Bechyné, 1951

Genus of leaf beetles from Central and South America

Ledesmodina is a genus of leaf beetles in the subfamily Eumolpinae. It is found in Central America and South America.

== Species ==
- Ledesmodina auricollis (Lefèvre, 1877) – Venezuela
- Ledesmodina erosula (Lefèvre, 1891)
  - Ledesmodina erosula abdominalis (Jacoby, 1900) – Brazil (Amazonas)
  - Ledesmodina erosula aenea (Jacoby, 1899) – Paraguay, Argentina
  - Ledesmodina erosula erosula (Lefèvre, 1891) – Colombia, Panama
  - Ledesmodina erosula minutella Bechyné, 1955 – Bolivia
- Ledesmodina megachroma Bechyné & Bechyné, 1976 – Brazil (Mato Grosso)
- Ledesmodina monrosi Bechyné, 1951 – Argentina, Brazil (Amazonas)
