= Thysanomeros =

Scientific classification
- Kingdom: Animalia
- Phylum: Arthropoda
- Clade: Pancrustacea
- Class: Insecta
- Order: Coleoptera
- Suborder: Polyphaga
- Infraorder: Cucujiformia
- Family: Chrysomelidae
- Subfamily: Eumolpinae
- Tribe: Eumolpini
- Genus: Thysanomeros; Flowers, 2003

Type species
- Colaspis jacobyi Lefèvre, 1885

Genus of leaf beetles from Costa Rica

Thysanomeros is a genus of leaf beetles in the subfamily Eumolpinae. It is found in Costa Rica. The generic name is derived from the Greek thysano ("brush") and meros ("femur").

== Species ==
- Thysanomeros jacobyi (Lefèvre, 1885)
- Thysanomeros ulateae Flowers, 2003
