= Australotymnes =

Scientific classification
- Kingdom: Animalia
- Phylum: Arthropoda
- Clade: Pancrustacea
- Class: Insecta
- Order: Coleoptera
- Suborder: Polyphaga
- Infraorder: Cucujiformia
- Family: Chrysomelidae
- Subfamily: Eumolpinae
- Tribe: Eumolpini
- Genus: Australotymnes; Flowers, 2009
- Species: A. jipijapa

Binomial name
- Australotymnes jipijapa Flowers, 2009

Genus of beetles

Australotymnes is a genus of leaf beetles in the subfamily Eumolpinae. The genus contains only one species, Australotymnes jipijapa, found in dry forest in western Ecuador. Adults of the species were collected from vegetation during the rainy season.

The generic name is a combination of Australo, from the Latin word australis (meaning "south"), and tymnes, from the genus Tymnes (which Australotymnes strongly resembles). The species is named after Jipijapa in the Manabí Province of Ecuador, the nearest town to where the holotype of the species was found.
