= Alittus =

Scientific classification
- Kingdom: Animalia
- Phylum: Arthropoda
- Clade: Pancrustacea
- Class: Insecta
- Order: Coleoptera
- Suborder: Polyphaga
- Infraorder: Cucujiformia
- Family: Chrysomelidae
- Subfamily: Eumolpinae
- Tribe: Eumolpini
- Genus: Alittus; Chapuis, 1874

Type species
- Alittus foveolatus Chapuis, 1874

Genus of leaf beetles from Australia

Alittus is a genus of leaf beetles in the subfamily Eumolpinae. It is known from Australia.

== Species ==
- Alittus carinatus (Blackburn, 1889)
- Alittus flavolineatus Lea, 1922
- Alittus foveolatus Chapuis, 1874
- Alittus macleayi Lea, 1915
- Alittus micans (Blackburn, 1889)
- Alittus politus (Blackburn, 1889)
- Alittus rugipennis Lea, 1915
- Alittus scutellaris Lea, 1915
