= Exochognathus =

Scientific classification
- Kingdom: Animalia
- Phylum: Arthropoda
- Clade: Pancrustacea
- Class: Insecta
- Order: Coleoptera
- Suborder: Polyphaga
- Infraorder: Cucujiformia
- Family: Chrysomelidae
- Subfamily: Eumolpinae
- Tribe: Eumolpini
- Genus: Exochognathus; Blake, 1946
- Species: E. limbatus

Binomial name
- Exochognathus limbatus Blake, 1946

Genus of leaf beetles from Cuba

Exochognathus is a genus of leaf beetles in the subfamily Eumolpinae, endemic to Cuba. It contains only one species, Exochognathus limbatus. The genus and species were described by the American entomologist Doris Holmes Blake in 1946, from a single male collected from the locality of Las Animas in the Sierra Rangel mountains in Pinar del Río Province, at an altitude of 1,500 feet.

The genus name is derived from the Ancient Greek words ἔξοχος ('jutting out') and γνάθος ('jaw'), in reference to the heavy jaws that project forward at an angle from the face.
