= Chalcoplacis =

Scientific classification
- Kingdom: Animalia
- Phylum: Arthropoda
- Clade: Pancrustacea
- Class: Insecta
- Order: Coleoptera
- Suborder: Polyphaga
- Infraorder: Cucujiformia
- Family: Chrysomelidae
- Subfamily: Eumolpinae
- Tribe: Eumolpini
- Genus: Chalcoplacis; Chevrolat in Dejean, 1836

Type species
- Colaspis fulgurans Klug, 1829

Synonyms
- Cyphra Gistel, 1848; Parachalcoplacis Bechyné, 1950

Genus of leaf beetles

Chalcoplacis is a genus of leaf beetles in the subfamily Eumolpinae. It is distributed in South America.

== Species ==
- Chalcoplacis abstracta (Bechyné, 1954) – Bolivia
- Chalcoplacis amabilis (Lefèvre, 1878) – Colombia, Venezuela
- Chalcoplacis anthrax (Bechyné, 1951) – Brazil
- Chalcoplacis bicolora (Jacoby, 1900) – Brazil
- Chalcoplacis bimaculata (Jacoby, 1900) – Brazil
- Chalcoplacis cearensis (Bechyné, 1954) – Brazil
- Chalcoplacis chopardi (Bechyné, 1954) – Brazil
- Chalcoplacis confraterna (Bechyné, 1951) – Brazil
- Chalcoplacis dilatata (Bechyné, 1950) – Brazil
- Chalcoplacis fallax (Bechyné, 1950) – Brazil
- Chalcoplacis flaveola (Jacoby, 1899) – Brazil, Guyana
- Chalcoplacis fulgens (Lefèvre, 1889) – Brazil
- Chalcoplacis fulgida (Lefèvre, 1885) – Brazil
- Chalcoplacis fulgurans (Klug, 1829) – Brazil
- Chalcoplacis fulvicollis (Jacoby, 1900)
  - Chalcoplacis fulvicollis aeneobadia Bechyné, 1965 – Brazil
  - Chalcoplacis fulvicollis fulvicollis (Jacoby, 1900) – Brazil
  - Chalcoplacis fulvicollis laeta (Weise, 1921) – Brazil
- Chalcoplacis gastrophysoides (Bechyné, 1953) – Brazil
- Chalcoplacis humilis (Lefèvre, 1891) – Venezuela
- Chalcoplacis igneipennis (Jacoby, 1898) – Brazil
- Chalcoplacis jujuyensis (Bechyné, 1954) – Argentina
- Chalcoplacis medvedevi Bechyné, 1958 – Brazil
- Chalcoplacis nicteroyensis (Bechyné, 1951) – Brazil
- Chalcoplacis ochracea (Weise, 1921)
  - Chalcoplacis ochracea navigatoria Bechyné, 1958 – Brazil
  - Chalcoplacis ochracea ochracea (Weise, 1921) – Brazil
- Chalcoplacis odontorhoa Bechyné, 1965 – Brazil
- Chalcoplacis olivia (Bechyné, 1950) – Brazil
- Chalcoplacis ovatula (Bechyné, 1954) – Brazil
- Chalcoplacis pallida (Weise, 1921) – Brazil
- Chalcoplacis plicipennis (Germar, 1824) – Brazil, Guyana
- Chalcoplacis progressa (Bechyné, 1951) – Brazil
- Chalcoplacis rufotestacea (Bechyné, 1954) – Brazil
- Chalcoplacis saudensis (Bechyné, 1954) – Brazil
- Chalcoplacis semisericea (Bechyné, 1953) – Brazil
- Chalcoplacis signata (Weise, 1921) – Brazil
- Chalcoplacis speciosa (Weise, 1921) – Brazil
- Chalcoplacis subcircularis (Bechyné, 1953) – Brazil
- Chalcoplacis sulcaticeps (Bechyné, 1951) – Brazil
- Chalcoplacis suturalis (Weise, 1921) – Brazil, Suriname, French Guiana
- Chalcoplacis tenella Bechyné, 1965 – Brazil
- Chalcoplacis terminata (Jacoby, 1900) – Brazil
- Chalcoplacis tricolor (Fauvel, 1861) – Guyana, Brazil
- Chalcoplacis varians (Bechyné, 1950) – Brazil
- Chalcoplacis virescens (Erichson, 1848)
  - Chalcoplacis virescens despecta (Lefèvre, 1884) – Peru
  - Chalcoplacis virescens impressiceps Bechyné, 1958 – Bolivia
  - Chalcoplacis virescens semifulva (Jacoby, 1900) – Brazil
  - Chalcoplacis virescens virescens (Erichson, 1848) – Guyana

Synonyms:

- Chalcoplacis amazonica (Jacoby, 1899): moved to Anachalcoplacis
- Chalcoplacis bryanti (Bechyné, 1950): synonym of Anachalcoplacis fulva fulva (Fabricius, 1801)
- Chalcoplacis clermonti (Bechyné, 1954): moved to Anachalcoplacis
- Chalcoplacis concinna (Weise, 1921): moved to Anachalcoplacis
- Chalcoplacis costulifera (Bechyné, 1954): moved to Plaumannita
- Chalcoplacis fulva (Fabricius, 1801): moved to Anachalcoplacis
- Chalcoplacis inermis (Bowditch, 1921): moved back to Hermesia
- Chalcoplacis ludicra (Bechyné, 1954): moved to Plaumannita
- Chalcoplacis pohli (Bechyné, 1951): synonym of Chalcoplacis fulgens (Lefèvre, 1889)
- Chalcoplacis striola Bechyné & Bechyné, 1961: moved to Marajoarinha
- Chalcoplacis subunicolor (Bechyné, 1953): synonym of Anachalcoplacis fulva fulva (Fabricius, 1801)
- Chalcoplacis subunicolor macrosoma Bechyné, 1958: synonym of Anachalcoplacis fulva macrosoma (Bechyné, 1958)
- Chalcoplacis subunicolor melanitarsis Bechyné, 1958: synonym of Anachalcoplacis fulva melanitarsis (Bechyné, 1958)
