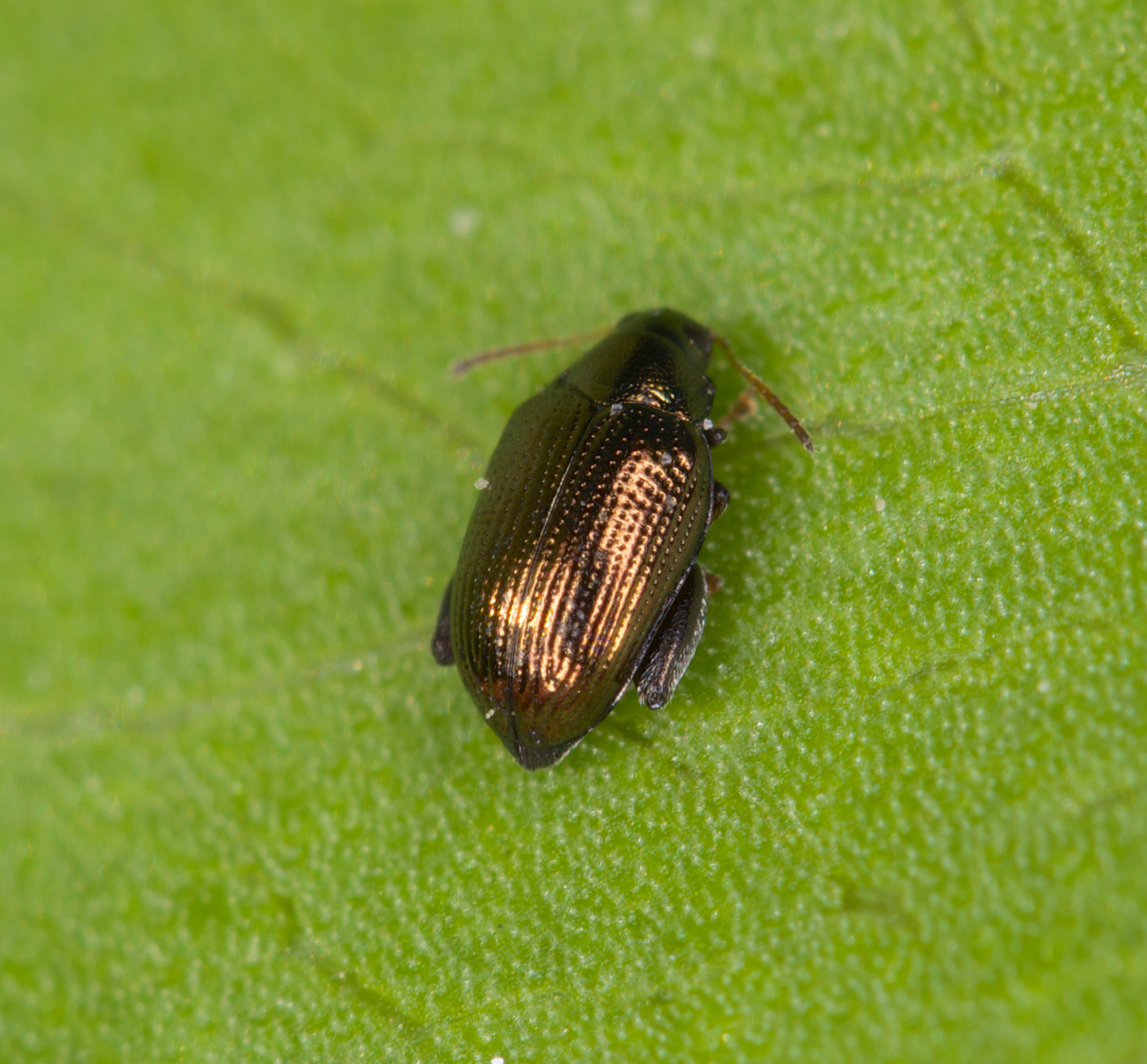

Scientific classification
- Kingdom: Animalia
- Phylum: Arthropoda
- Clade: Pancrustacea
- Class: Insecta
- Order: Coleoptera
- Suborder: Polyphaga
- Infraorder: Cucujiformia
- Family: Chrysomelidae
- Subfamily: Eumolpinae
- Tribe: Eumolpini
- Genus: Geloptera; Baly, 1861

Type species
- Geloptera tuberculata Baly, 1861

= Geloptera =

Genus of leaf beetles from Australia

Geloptera is a genus of leaf beetles in the subfamily Eumolpinae. It is known from Australia.

== Species ==
- Geloptera albertisii Jacoby, 1884
- Geloptera angulicollis Lea, 1915
- Geloptera apicilata Lea, 1922
- Geloptera apiciventris Lea, 1922
- Geloptera armiventris Lea, 1915
- Geloptera basiventris Lea, 1915
- Geloptera bidentimedia Lea, 1915
- Geloptera coatesi Lea, 1915
- Geloptera composita Lea, 1915
- Geloptera concinna Lea, 1915
- Geloptera duboulayi Clark, 1865
- Geloptera eluta Lea, 1915
- Geloptera femoralis (Jacoby, 1884)
- Geloptera hardcastlei Lea, 1915
- Geloptera igneonitens Baly, 1878
- Geloptera illidgei Lea, 1915
- Geloptera inaequalis Lea, 1915
- Geloptera intercoxalis Lea, 1915
- Geloptera jugularis (Erichson, 1842)
- Geloptera latericollis Lea, 1915
- Geloptera lateridens Lea, 1915
- Geloptera mediofusca Lea, 1915
- Geloptera microcalla Lea, 1915
- Geloptera minima Lea, 1915
- Geloptera miracula Lea, 1915
- Geloptera nodosa Clark, 1865
- Geloptera orientalis Lea, 1915
- Geloptera pallipes Lea, 1915
- Geloptera parvonitens Lea, 1925
- Geloptera porosa Lea, 1915
- Geloptera punctatissima Lea, 1915
- Geloptera rhaebocnema Lea, 1915
- Geloptera scitula Lea, 1915
- Geloptera semistriata Lea, 1915
- Geloptera setifera Lea, 1915
- Geloptera soror Lea, 1922
- Geloptera striatipennis Lea, 1915
- Geloptera tetraspilota Lea, 1915
- Geloptera tibialis Lea, 1915
- Geloptera tuberculata Baly, 1861
- Geloptera tuberculiventris Lea, 1915
- Geloptera uncinata Lea, 1915
- Geloptera viridimarginata Lea, 1922
