= Hylax =

Scientific classification
- Kingdom: Animalia
- Phylum: Arthropoda
- Clade: Pancrustacea
- Class: Insecta
- Order: Coleoptera
- Suborder: Polyphaga
- Infraorder: Cucujiformia
- Family: Chrysomelidae
- Subfamily: Eumolpinae
- Tribe: Eumolpini
- Genus: Hylax; Lefèvre, 1884

Type species
- Amasis calcaratus Chapuis, 1874

Synonyms
- Amasis Chapuis, 1874 (preoccupied)

Genus of leaf beetles from Central and South America

Hylax is a genus of leaf beetles in the subfamily Eumolpinae. It is distributed in Central America and South America.

The species Hylax bahiensis was recorded attacking clonal eucalyptus plantations and forest restoration areas between 2010 and 2013 in the states of Espírito Santo, Bahia and Minas Gerais in Brazil.

== Species ==
- Hylax aeneus (Lefèvre, 1878) – Colombia
- Hylax apollodorus Bechyné, 1955 – Paraguay
- Hylax analectus Bechyné, 1951 – Bolivia
- Hylax bahiensis Bechyné, 1950 – Brazil
- Hylax bolivianus (Jacoby, 1882) – Bolivia
- Hylax calcaratus (Chapuis, 1874)
  - Hylax calcaratus chalcaratus (Chapuis, 1874) – Brazil
  - Hylax calcaratus vianai (Bechyné, 1949) – Brazil, Paraguay, Argentina
- Hylax chalybaeus (Lefèvre, 1878) – Colombia, Mexico, Panama
- Hylax chiriquiensis (Jacoby, 1900) – Panama
- Hylax chrysodinoides Bechyné, 1951 – Paraguay, Argentina
- Hylax continuus (Bechyné, 1949) – Peru
- Hylax coroicensis Bechyné, 1950
  - Hylax coroicensis coroicensis Bechyné, 1950 – Bolivia
  - Hylax coroicensis subcorpulentus Bechyné, 1958 – Peru
- Hylax costaricensis Bechyné, 1951 – Costa Rica
- Hylax cupreus (Olivier, 1791) – French Guiana
- Hylax cyanipes (Lefèvre, 1884) – French Guiana
- Hylax dilatipes (Bowditch, 1921) – Paraguay
- Hylax dimidiatus (Jacoby, 1900) – Peru, Bolivia, Ecuador
- Hylax elongatus (Lefèvre, 1884) – Ecuador
- Hylax ferox (Baly, 1865) – Guyana
- Hylax flavipes (Lefèvre, 1885) – Peru
- Hylax guerini Bechyné, 1953 – Brazil
- Hylax hilaris (Lefèvre, 1884) – Guyana, Brazil, Bolivia
- Hylax humeralis (Baly, 1860) – Brazil
- Hylax hoegei (Jacoby, 1890) – Mexico
- Hylax klugi (Lefèvre, 1884) – French Guiana, Brazil
- Hylax lateralis (Germar, 1824) – Guyana, Brazil
- Hylax marcapatensis Bechyné, 1955 – Peru
- Hylax mexicanus (Jacoby, 1881) – Mexico
- Hylax mutabilis (Lefèvre, 1878) – Colombia
- Hylax nigroviolaceus (Jacoby, 1900) – Brazil
- Hylax pereirai Bechyné, 1958 – Brazil
- Hylax peruanus (Lefèvre, 1895) – Peru
- Hylax plagiatus (Lefèvre, 1878) – Colombia
- Hylax pseudoviolaceus Bechyné, 1953 – Guatemala
- Hylax puncticollis (Jacoby, 1890) – Mexico
- Hylax quadriplagiatus (Jacoby, 1881) – Mexico
- Hylax romani (Weise, 1921) – Brazil
- Hylax rufimanus (Lefèvre, 1878) – Colombia
- Hylax rufotestaceus (Lefèvre, 1878) – Colombia
- Hylax rugulosus (Lefèvre, 1882) – Ecuador
- Hylax rutilans (Lefèvre, 1885) – Colombia
- Hylax spinipes (Latreille, 1832) – South America
- Hylax strigatus (Lefèvre, 1884) – French Guiana, Brazil
- Hylax strigicollis (Jacoby, 1890) – Brazil, Paraguay, Argentina
- Hylax tarsalis (Lefèvre, 1885) – Venezuela, Brazil (?)
- Hylax tenebrosus (Jacoby, 1890) – Panama
- Hylax viridis (Bowditch, 1921) – Costa Rica, Guatemala
- Hylax wygodzinskyi Bechyné, 1950 – Argentina
- Hylax zikani (Bechyné, 1949) – Brazil

The following species were moved to Hermesia:

- Hylax auratus (Olivier, 1808)
- Hylax auratus violaceus (Jacoby, 1882): synonym of Hermesia inermis Bowditch, 1921
- Hylax cyaneus (Bowditch, 1921)

Other synonyms:

- Hylax lateralis (Lefèvre, 1878): synonym of Chalcoplacis plicipennis (Germar, 1824)
