= Colaspinella =

Scientific classification
- Kingdom: Animalia
- Phylum: Arthropoda
- Clade: Pancrustacea
- Class: Insecta
- Order: Coleoptera
- Suborder: Polyphaga
- Infraorder: Cucujiformia
- Family: Chrysomelidae
- Subfamily: Eumolpinae
- Tribe: Eumolpini
- Genus: Colaspinella; Weise, 1893
- Species: C. grandis

Binomial name
- Colaspinella grandis (Frivaldszky, 1880)

Synonyms
- Genus: Weigelia Medvedev, 2005; Species: Colaspidea grandis Frivaldszky, 1880; Weigelia fritzlari Medvedev, 2005

Genus of leaf beetles from Turkey

Colaspinella is a genus of leaf beetles in the subfamily Eumolpinae. It contains only one species, Colaspinella grandis. It is endemic to Turkey.
