= Paleomolpus =

Paleomolpus Temporal range: Late Eocene

Scientific classification
- Kingdom: Animalia
- Phylum: Arthropoda
- Clade: Pancrustacea
- Class: Insecta
- Order: Coleoptera
- Suborder: Polyphaga
- Infraorder: Cucujiformia
- Family: Chrysomelidae
- Subfamily: Eumolpinae
- Tribe: Eumolpini
- Genus: †Paleomolpus; Nadein, 2015
- Species: †P. hirtus

Binomial name
- †Paleomolpus hirtus Nadein, 2015

Extinct genus of leaf beetles

Paleomolpus is an extinct genus of leaf beetles in the subfamily Eumolpinae. It contains only one species, Paleomolpus hirtus. It is known from late Eocene amber from Denmark. The generic name is derived from the Ancient Greek palaios ("old, ancient") and -molpus (from Eumolpus). The specific name, Latin for hairy, refers to the pubescent dorsum of the species.
