= Monrosiella =

Scientific classification
- Kingdom: Animalia
- Phylum: Arthropoda
- Clade: Pancrustacea
- Class: Insecta
- Order: Coleoptera
- Suborder: Polyphaga
- Infraorder: Cucujiformia
- Family: Chrysomelidae
- Subfamily: Eumolpinae
- Tribe: Eumolpini
- Genus: Monrosiella; Bechyné, 1945

Type species
- Argoa mucronata Jacoby, 1900

Genus of leaf beetles

Monrosiella is a genus of leaf beetles in the subfamily Eumolpinae. It is known from South America.

The genus is named in honor of Argentinian entomologist Francisco Monrós.

== Species ==
- Monrosiella freyi Würmli, 1975
- Monrosiella mucronata (Jacoby, 1900)
