= Colaspedusa =

Scientific classification
- Kingdom: Animalia
- Phylum: Arthropoda
- Clade: Pancrustacea
- Class: Insecta
- Order: Coleoptera
- Suborder: Polyphaga
- Infraorder: Cucujiformia
- Family: Chrysomelidae
- Subfamily: Eumolpinae
- Tribe: Eumolpini
- Genus: Colaspedusa; Medvedev, 1998

Type species
- Colaspedusa bicoloripes Medvedev, 1998

Genus of leaf beetles from Southeast Asia

Colaspedusa is a genus of leaf beetles in the subfamily Eumolpinae, found in Southeast Asia.

== Species ==
- Colaspedusa bicoloripes Medvedev, 1998 – Peninsular Malaysia, Penang Island
- Colaspedusa houaphanica Moseyko & Romantsov, 2022 – Northern Laos
- Colaspedusa verrucosa Medvedev & Zoia, 2001 – Southern Thailand
