= Acolaspoides =

Acolaspoides Temporal range: Ypresian

Scientific classification
- Kingdom: Animalia
- Phylum: Arthropoda
- Clade: Pancrustacea
- Class: Insecta
- Order: Coleoptera
- Suborder: Polyphaga
- Infraorder: Cucujiformia
- Family: Chrysomelidae
- Subfamily: Eumolpinae
- Tribe: Eumolpini
- Genus: †Acolaspoides; Moseyko, Kirejtshuk & Nel, 2010
- Species: †A. longipes

Binomial name
- †Acolaspoides longipes Moseyko, Kirejtshuk & Nel, 2010

Genus of beetles

Acolaspoides is an extinct genus of leaf beetles in the subfamily Eumolpinae. It contains only one species, Acolaspoides longipes, and is known only from lowermost Eocene amber collected from Le Quesnoy, Oise Department, France.

The species is known only from one fossil, the holotype, specimen number "PA 2364". It is an almost complete beetle of unknown sex included in a small piece of amber. The specimen is currently deposited at the Muséum national d'histoire naturelle in Paris, France. Acolaspoides was first studied by Alexey G. Moseyko and Alexander G. Kirejtshuk of the Zoological Institute of the Russian Academy of Sciences and Andre Nel of the Muséum national d'histoire naturelle. Their type description of the genus was published in the journal Annales de la Société Entomologique de France in 2010.

The generic name, Acolaspoides, is derived from the negative prefix "a" and the generic name Colaspoides. The specific name, longipes, is a combination of the Latin words longus ("long") and pes ("foot").
