= Glyptosceloides =

Scientific classification
- Kingdom: Animalia
- Phylum: Arthropoda
- Clade: Pancrustacea
- Class: Insecta
- Order: Coleoptera
- Suborder: Polyphaga
- Infraorder: Cucujiformia
- Family: Chrysomelidae
- Subfamily: Eumolpinae
- Tribe: Eumolpini
- Genus: Glyptosceloides; Askevold & Flowers, 1994
- Species: G. dentatus

Binomial name
- Glyptosceloides dentatus Askevold & Flowers, 1994

Genus of leaf beetles from Chile

Glyptosceloides is a genus of leaf beetles in the subfamily Eumolpinae, found in the Coquimbo Region of Chile. It contains only one species, Glyptosceloides dentatus. The generic name comes from the genus Glyptoscelis, referring to how Glyptosceloides dentatus resembles Glyptoscelis pulvinosus. The specific name refers to the broad tooth present on the profemora (the femora of the front legs). The males have enlarged mandibles and a larger head.
