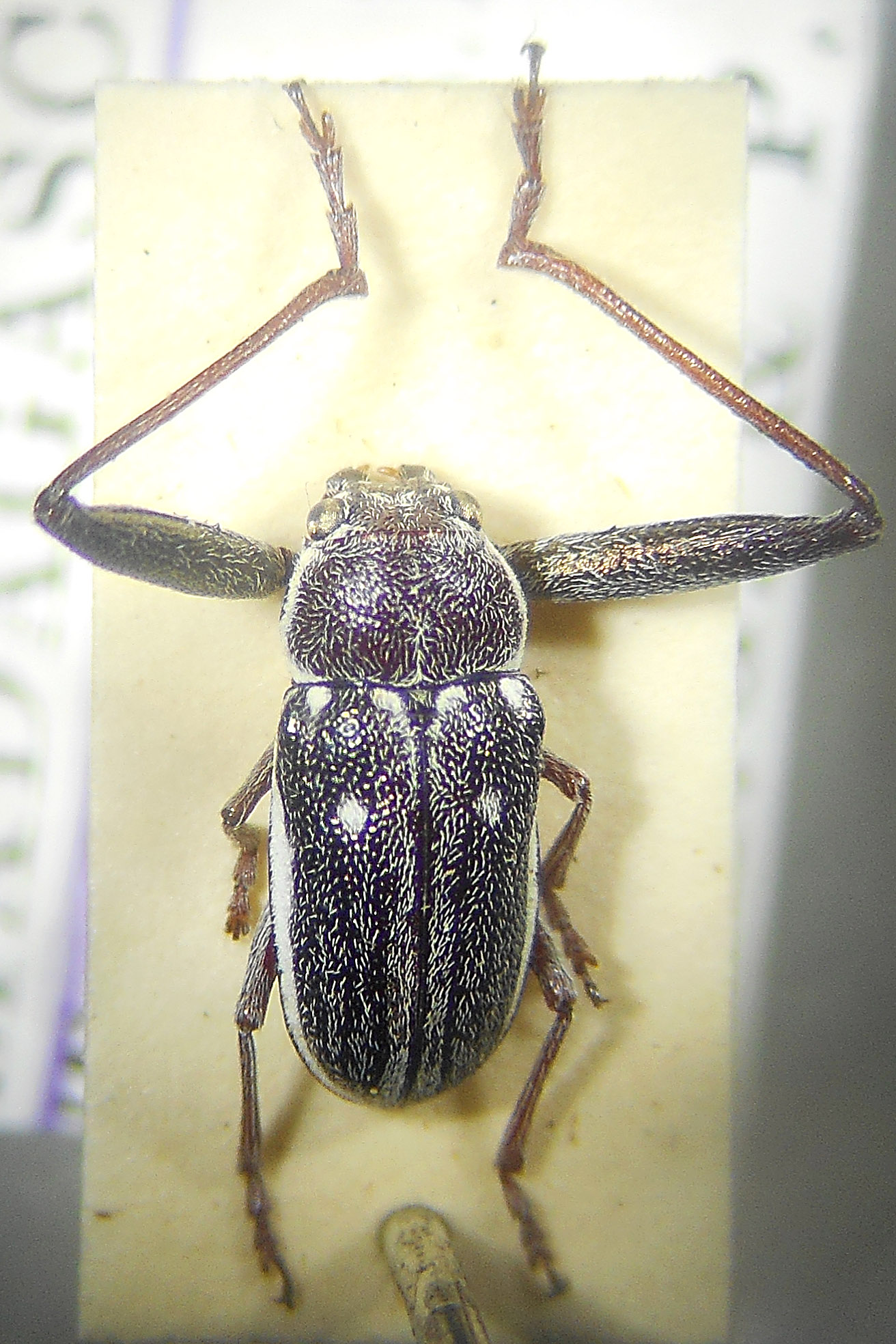
- Arsoa aranea

Scientific classification
- Kingdom: Animalia
- Phylum: Arthropoda
- Clade: Pancrustacea
- Class: Insecta
- Order: Coleoptera
- Suborder: Polyphaga
- Infraorder: Cucujiformia
- Family: Chrysomelidae
- Subfamily: Eumolpinae
- Tribe: Eumolpini
- Genus: Arsoa; Fairmaire, 1901

= Arsoa =

Genus of leaf beetles from Madagascar

Arsoa is a genus of leaf beetles in the subfamily Eumolpinae. It was first established by the French entomologist Léon Fairmaire in 1901, for two species described from Androy Plateau, in southern Madagascar. Adult males in the genus have very long forelegs.

The genus was originally placed by Fairmaire in the family Clythridae (now known as the tribe Clytrini), near Miopristis. However, Martin Jacoby later determined that it actually belonged to Eumolpinae, and placed it in the "Edusinae" (now known as the section "Edusites" of the tribe Eumolpini), near Abirus.

== Description ==
Adult males have very long forelegs that are slender and straight; the femurs are thicker, and are almost as long as the tibias. The head is the same width as the thorax, and truncated in front. The antennae protrude a little from the middle of the body, are very slender, except the first segment, the third a little longer than the next, the last barely thicker. The thorax is slightly narrower than the elytra, very narrowed in the front with the posterior border bisinuated; these are almost cylindrical, or oval. The prosternum is truncated in front and at the base, very broad, the mesosternum a little less. The intercoxal projection is rather broad and obtuse. The four hind legs are rather short and slender, the femurs a little thickened. The body is densely punctuated, more or less a greenish tan colour with dots and bands of whitish pubescence.

The females are similar to the males, but have shorter forelegs and antennae.

== Species ==
The genus Arsoa includes two species:

- Arsoa aranea Fairmaire, 1901
- Arsoa longimana Fairmaire, 1901
