= Megalocolaspoides =

Scientific classification
- Kingdom: Animalia
- Phylum: Arthropoda
- Clade: Pancrustacea
- Class: Insecta
- Order: Coleoptera
- Suborder: Polyphaga
- Infraorder: Cucujiformia
- Family: Chrysomelidae
- Subfamily: Eumolpinae
- Tribe: Eumolpini
- Genus: Megalocolaspoides; Medvedev, 2005

Type species
- Megalocolaspoides fulvescens Medvedev, 2005

Genus of leaf beetles from Southeast Asia

Megalocolaspoides is a genus of leaf beetles in the subfamily Eumolpinae. It is found in Southeast Asia.

== Species ==
- Megalocolaspoides borneoensis Medvedev, 2009 – Borneo
- Megalocolaspoides fulvescens Medvedev, 2005 – Vietnam
