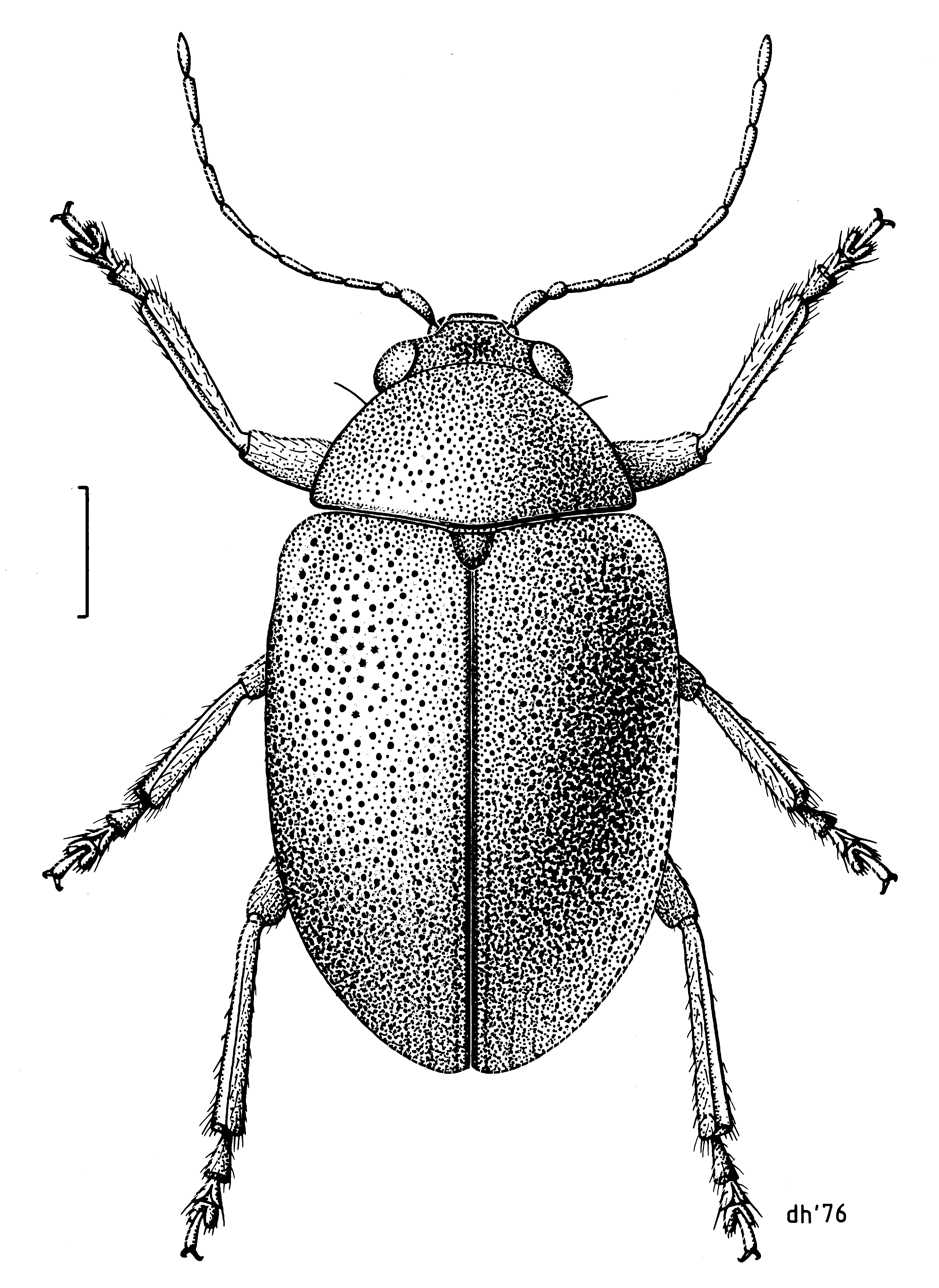
- Eucolaspis brunnea

Scientific classification
- Kingdom: Animalia
- Phylum: Arthropoda
- Clade: Pancrustacea
- Class: Insecta
- Order: Coleoptera
- Suborder: Polyphaga
- Infraorder: Cucujiformia
- Family: Chrysomelidae
- Subfamily: Eumolpinae
- Tribe: Eumolpini
- Genus: Eucolaspis; Sharp, 1886

Type species
- Colaspis puncticollis (= Colaspis pallidipennis White, 1846) Broun, 1880

= Eucolaspis =

Genus of leaf beetles from New Zealand and Fiji

Eucolaspis is a genus of leaf beetles in the subfamily Eumolpinae. It is native to New Zealand, where it is a serious pest of apple trees and other fruit crops. The genus has also been reported from Fiji.

== Taxonomy ==
The taxonomy of the genus is generally considered to be unresolved, as it is ambiguous how many species the genus contains.

Fifteen species were described from New Zealand by Fabricius (1781), White (1846) and Broun (1880, 1893, 1909). In 1957, Shaw revised the genus, reducing the number of species in New Zealand to five (including two newly described species of his own). However, later entomologists ignored Shaw's synonymy. In the same year, two species of the genus were described from Fiji by Bryant and Gressitt.

In 2015, using morphological and genetic evidence, several researchers proposed instead just three lineages (or putative species) of the genus in the mainland of New Zealand, using the names "Eucolaspis puncticollis", "Eucolaspis picticornis" and "Eucolaspis jucunda". However, in 2019, Spanish entomologist Jesús Gómez-Zurita analysed the diversity and distribution of the genus, and his observations generally agreed with the conclusions of Shaw's 1957 revision, identifying at least five species of Eucolaspis in New Zealand. In addition, he described a new species, Eucolaspis kotatou, from Te Paki, near Cape Reinga.

== Species ==
New Zealand species, according to Shaw (1957) and Gómez-Zurita (2019):

- Eucolaspis antennata Shaw, 1957
- Eucolaspis brunnea (Fabricius, 1781) (synonyms: E. brevicollis (Broun, 1880); E. ochracea Broun, 1893; E. colorata Broun, 1893; E. vittiger Broun, 1893; E. picticornis Broun, 1893)
- Eucolaspis hudsoni Shaw, 1957
- Eucolaspis jucunda (Broun, 1880) (synonyms: E. subaenea (Broun, 1880); E. mera (Broun, 1880); E. atrocerulea (Broun, 1880))
- Eucolaspis kotatou Gómez-Zurita, 2019
- Eucolaspis pallidipennis (White, 1846) (synonyms: E. puncticollis (Broun, 1880); E. sculpta (Broun, 1880); E. montana Broun, 1893; E. plicatus Broun, 1909)

Fiji species, according to Bryant & Gressitt (1957):

- Eucolaspis castanea Bryant, 1957
- Eucolaspis saltator Gressitt, 1957
