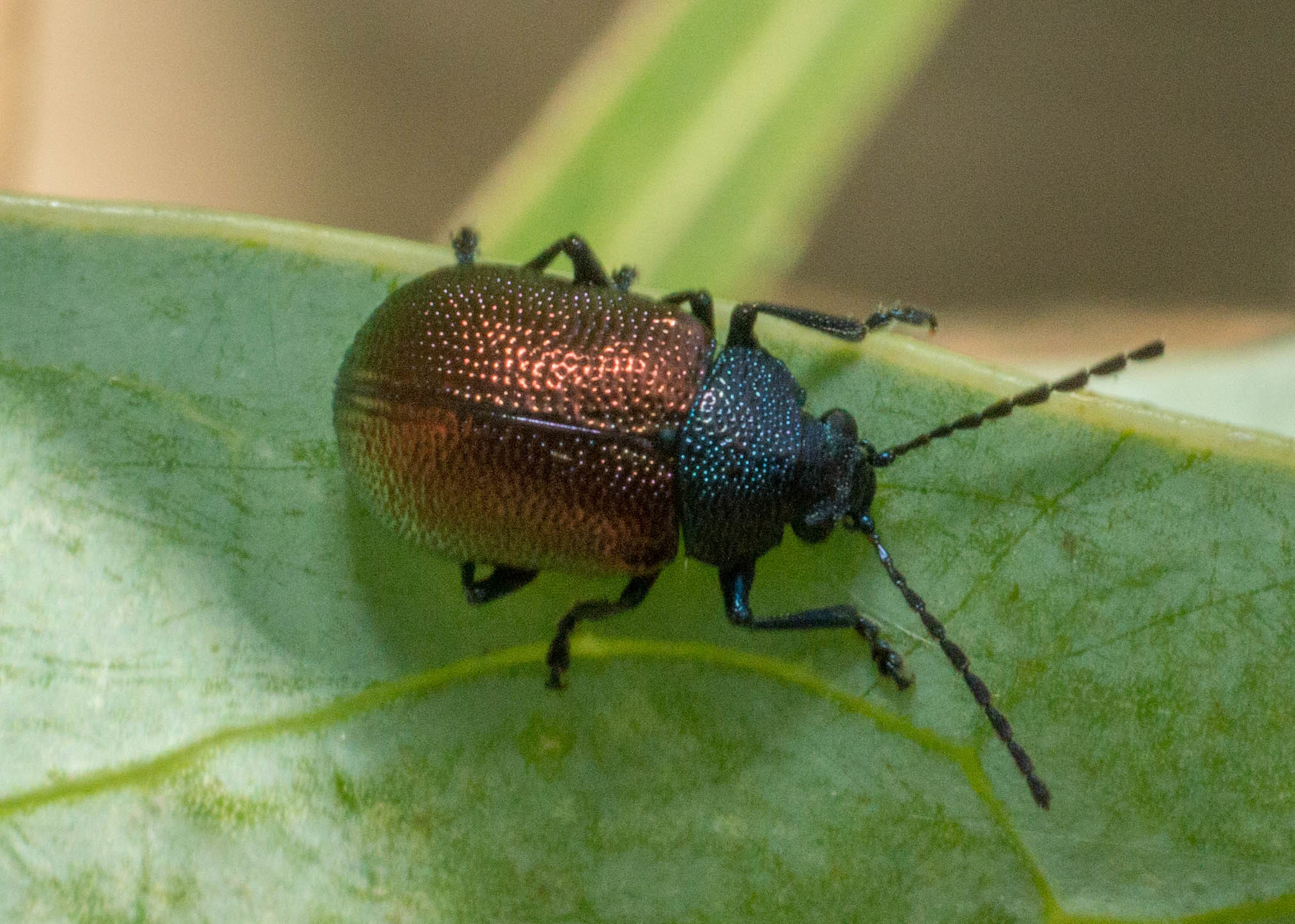
- Freudeita cupripennis

Scientific classification
- Kingdom: Animalia
- Phylum: Arthropoda
- Clade: Pancrustacea
- Class: Insecta
- Order: Coleoptera
- Suborder: Polyphaga
- Infraorder: Cucujiformia
- Family: Chrysomelidae
- Subfamily: Eumolpinae
- Tribe: Eumolpini
- Genus: Freudeita; Bechyné, 1950

Type species
- Colaspis parellina Erichson, 1847

= Freudeita =

Genus of leaf beetles from South America

Freudeita is a genus of leaf beetles in the subfamily Eumolpinae. It is found in South America. The genus is dedicated to the German entomologist Heinz Freude.

In May 2019, the New Zealand Environmental Protection Authority approved an application to introduce Freudeita cf. cupripennis as a biological control agent against the moth plant (Araujia hortorum), an invasive weed in New Zealand.

== Species ==
- Freudeita alternata (Lefèvre, 1891) – Brazil
- Freudeita callosa Bechyné, 1953 – Brazil
- Freudeita chalcites (Lefèvre, 1884)
- Freudeita colligens Bechyné, 1951 – Bolivia
- Freudeita cruda Bechyné, 1951 – Bolivia
- Freudeita cuprinula Bechyné, 1950
  - Freudeita cuprinula cuprinula Bechyné, 1950 – Brazil
  - Freudeita cuprinula fortis Bechyné & Bechyné, 1964 – Brazil
  - Freudeita cuprinula maldonaldoi Bechyné, 1953 – Argentina, Uruguay
- Freudeita cupripennis (Lefèvre, 1877) – Brazil, Paraguay, Argentina, Uruguay
- Freudeita duplicata (Lefèvre, 1877) – Brazil
- Freudeita interlata Bechyné & Bechyné, 1961 – Brazil
- Freudeita iracunda Bechyné, 1950 – Brazil
- Freudeita macroscopia Bechyné, 1954 – Brazil
- Freudeita parellina (Erichson, 1847) – Peru, Bolivia, Ecuador
- Freudeita peruviana (Bowditch, 1921) – Peru
- Freudeita plaumanni Bechyné, 1951 – Brazil
- Freudeita porosa (Jacoby, 1900) – Peru, Bolivia, Argentina, Paraguay, Brazil
- Freudeita proligens Bechyné, 1951 – Peru
- Freudeita subopaca Bechyné, 1950 – Brazil, Paraguay, Argentina (Misiones)
- Freudeita violacea (Lefèvre, 1877)
  - Freudeita violacea consentanea (Lefèvre, 1891) – Brazil
  - Freudeita violacea cyaneoazurea Bechyné, 1951 – Peru
  - Freudeita violacea subnitida Bechyné, 1950 – Bolivia
  - Freudeita violacea violacea (Lefèvre, 1877) – Brazil
- Freudeita viridipes (Lefèvre, 1877)
  - Freudeita viridipes cyanea (Lefèvre, 1885) – Brazil
  - Freudeita viridipes viridipes (Lefèvre, 1877) – Brazil

Species transferred to other genera:

- Freudeita balyi (Jacoby, 1881): moved back to Colaspis – Guatemala, Costa Rica, Colombia, Venezuela
- Freudeita dentifera Bechyné, 1951: moved to Colaspis – Costa Rica, Panama, Trinidad
- Freudeita melancholica (Jacoby, 1881): moved back to Colaspis – Mexico, Guatemala, El Salvador, Nicaragua, Costa Rica, Panama, Colombia, Venezuela
