= Tyrannomolpus =

Scientific classification
- Kingdom: Animalia
- Phylum: Arthropoda
- Clade: Pancrustacea
- Class: Insecta
- Order: Coleoptera
- Suborder: Polyphaga
- Infraorder: Cucujiformia
- Family: Chrysomelidae
- Subfamily: Eumolpinae
- Tribe: Eumolpini
- Genus: Tyrannomolpus; Nadein & Leschen, 2017
- Species: T. rex

Binomial name
- Tyrannomolpus rex Nadein & Leschen, 2017

Genus of leaf beetles from Three Kings Islands, New Zealand

Tyrannomolpus is a genus of leaf beetles in the subfamily Eumolpinae. It is known only from Three Kings Islands, New Zealand. It contains only one species, Tyrannomolpus rex. T. rex is the largest chrysomelid beetle species endemic to New Zealand, measuring between 9.7 and 11.9 mm, and may be an example of island gigantism. It has a dark bronzy-green color with a metallic luster. Tyrannomolpus is closest to the genus Pilacolaspis from the mainland of New Zealand.

The generic name is a combination of the dinosaur genus name Tyrannosaurus and the suffix "molpus", referring to the relative large size of the genus to other chrysomelids endemic to New Zealand. The specific name, rex, is the Latin for "king", referring to the only known location of the genus, Three Kings Islands.

A single specimen of the species was collected from Meryta sinclairii (also known as the puka), a tree endemic to the Three Kings Islands.
