= Edusella =

Scientific classification
- Kingdom: Animalia
- Phylum: Arthropoda
- Clade: Pancrustacea
- Class: Insecta
- Order: Coleoptera
- Suborder: Polyphaga
- Infraorder: Cucujiformia
- Family: Chrysomelidae
- Subfamily: Eumolpinae
- Tribe: Eumolpini
- Genus: Edusella; Chapuis, 1874

Type species
- Edusa suturalis Chapuis, 1874

Synonyms
- Edusa Chevrolat in Dejean, 1836; Edusa Chapuis, 1874 (nec Gistel, 1848 nec Albers, 1860); Edusina Chapuis, 1874; Edusia Lefèvre, 1885

Genus of leaf beetles from Australia

Edusella is a genus of leaf beetles in the subfamily Eumolpinae. It mainly occurs in Australia, with a single species occurring in New Caledonia.

== Taxonomy ==
The genus Edusa was originally named by Louis Alexandre Auguste Chevrolat in 1836, in Dejean's Catalogue of Coleoptera. However, the name Edusa is usually attributed to Félicien Chapuis, who described the genus in 1874 and divided it into three subgenera: Edusa, Edusella, and Edusina. These divisions of the genus are not used by later authors. Edusa Chapuis, 1874 was then found to be preoccupied by multiple older animal genera of the same name (by Gistel, 1848 in Tunicata and Albers, 1860 in Gastropoda), so it was renamed to Edusia by Édouard Lefèvre in 1885. However, the name Edusa continued to be used for these beetles by some authors regardless. Later, the name Edusella, one of the subgenera created by Chapuis, was chosen as the name of the genus instead of either Edusa or Edusia.

According to Bousquet and Bouchard in 2013, the original name Edusa by Chevrolat was actually available, and therefore has priority over Edusella. An application to the ICZN is necessary to conserve usage of the name Edusella Chapuis, 1874.

== Species ==
Species include:

- Edusella abdominalis (Lea, 1915)
- Edusella aenea (Blackburn, 1891)
- Edusella angustula (Blackburn, 1900)
- Edusella araeoceroides (Lea, 1915)
- Edusella atrichia (Lea, 1915)
- Edusella aureorufa (Lea, 1915)
- Edusella aureoviridis (Clark, 1865)
- Edusella blackburni (Lea, 1915)
- Edusella capillata (Lea, 1922)
- Edusella chalcea (Lea, 1915)
- Edusella chlorion (Lea, 1915)
- Edusella chlorophana (Lea, 1915)
- Edusella chrysura (Germar, 1848)
- Edusella clypealis (Lea, 1915)
- Edusella decemlineata (Lea, 1921)
- Edusella discicollis (Lea, 1915)
- Edusella dispar (Lea, 1915)
- Edusella distincta (Blackburn, 1891)
- Edusella diversicollis (Blackburn, 1891)
- Edusella flaveola (Montrouzier, 1861)
- Edusella flavicornis (Lea, 1915)
- Edusella flavipes (Lea, 1915)
- Edusella fraterna (Blackburn, 1891)
- Edusella froggatti (Blackburn, 1891)
- Edusella fusca (Lea, 1915)
- Edusella germari (Lefèvre, 1891)
- Edusella glabra (Blackburn, 1891)
- Edusella glauca (Blackburn, 1891)
- Edusella griffithi (Lea, 1915)
- Edusella heterodoxa (Lea, 1915)
- Edusella hirta (Blackburn, 1891)
- Edusella hispidula (Clark, 1865)
- Edusella impressiceps (Lea, 1915)
- Edusella inermis (Blackburn, 1891)
- Edusella lineata (Blackburn, 1891)
- Edusella melanoptera (Lea, 1915)
- Edusella melanosoma (Lea, 1915)
- Edusella metallica (Lea, 1915)
- Edusella meyricki (Blackburn, 1891)
- Edusella minor (Blackburn, 1891)
- Edusella mira (Lea, 1915)
- Edusella montana (Lea, 1915)
- Edusella monticola (Lea, 1915)
- Edusella multicolor (Lea, 1922)
- Edusella mutica (Germar, 1848)
- Edusella nigroaenea (Clark, 1865)
- Edusella niveosquamosa (Lea, 1915)
- Edusella obscura (Lea, 1922)
- Edusella pallidiventris (Lea, 1915)
- Edusella palpalis (Lea, 1915)
- Edusella pavens (Blackburn, 1891)
- Edusella perplexa (Blackburn, 1891)
- Edusella pilifera (Blackburn, 1891)
- Edusella plicata (Lea, 1915)
- Edusella podagrosa (Lea, 1915)
- Edusella posthumeralis (Lea, 1915)
- Edusella puberula (Boheman, 1858)
- Edusella pulchra (Elston, 1919)
- Edusella punctipennis (Lea, 1922)
- Edusella rufilabris (Lea, 1915)
- Edusella securigera (Lea, 1915)
- Edusella septentrionalis (Weise, 1923)
- Edusella sericea (Lea, 1915)
- Edusella setipennis (Lea, 1915)
- Edusella suaveola (Germar, 1848)
- Edusella submaculata (Lea, 1915)
- Edusella suturalis (Chapuis, 1874)
- Edusella tridens (Lea, 1915)
- Edusella turneri (Lea, 1915)
- Edusella ursa (Lea, 1915)
- Edusella varians (Blackburn, 1891)
- Edusella varipes (Boisduval, 1835)
- Edusella virgatipes (Lea, 1915)
- Edusella viridicollis (Lefèvre, 1875)
- Edusella viridifrons (Lea, 1915)
- Edusella viridilatera (Lea, 1915)
- Edusella viridimetallica (Lea, 1915)
- Edusella viridipennis (Boheman, 1858)
- Edusella ziczac (Lea, 1915)
- Edusella zietzi (Lea, 1915)
