= Samuelsonia =

Scientific classification
- Kingdom: Animalia
- Phylum: Arthropoda
- Clade: Pancrustacea
- Class: Insecta
- Order: Coleoptera
- Suborder: Polyphaga
- Infraorder: Cucujiformia
- Family: Chrysomelidae
- Subfamily: Eumolpinae
- Tribe: Eumolpini
- Genus: Samuelsonia; Jolivet, Verma & Mille, 2007

Type species
- Samuelsonia melas Jolivet, Verma & Mille, 2007

Genus of leaf beetles from New Caledonia

Samuelsonia is a genus of leaf beetles in the subfamily Eumolpinae. It is known from the South Province and Mont Panié of New Caledonia, and is named after Dr. G. Allan Samuelson of the Bishop Museum. The genus was established based on general proportions and body size, and may be polyphyletic or paraphyletic.

== Species ==
- Samuelsonia bicolor Jolivet, Verma & Mille, 2007
- Samuelsonia dunali (Montrouzier, 1861)
- Samuelsonia fauveli Jolivet, Verma & Mille, 2007
- Samuelsonia fusca Jolivet, Verma & Mille, 2007
- Samuelsonia gomeyi Jolivet, Verma & Mille, 2013
- Samuelsonia histrio (Perroud & Montrouzier, 1864)
- Samuelsonia lemerrei Jolivet, Verma & Mille, 2013
- Samuelsonia mayonae Jolivet, Verma & Mille, 2010
- Samuelsonia melas Jolivet, Verma & Mille, 2007
- Samuelsonia minima Jolivet, Verma & Mille, 2013
- Samuelsonia nitida Jolivet, Verma & Mille, 2013
- Samuelsonia panieensis Jolivet, Verma & Mille, 2011
- Samuelsonia pardalis Jolivet, Verma & Mille, 2007
- Samuelsonia pilosa Jolivet, Verma & Mille, 2007
- Samuelsonia pygmaea Jolivet, Verma & Mille, 2010
- Samuelsonia rubiacearum (Perroud & Montrouzier, 1864)
- Samuelsonia rugosa Jolivet, Verma & Mille, 2013
- Samuelsonia turgida Jolivet, Verma & Mille, 2007
- Samuelsonia viridiscens Jolivet, Verma & Mille, 2013
