= Iphimoides =

Scientific classification
- Kingdom: Animalia
- Phylum: Arthropoda
- Clade: Pancrustacea
- Class: Insecta
- Order: Coleoptera
- Suborder: Polyphaga
- Infraorder: Cucujiformia
- Family: Chrysomelidae
- Subfamily: Eumolpinae
- Tribe: Eumolpini
- Genus: Iphimoides; Jacoby, 1883

Type species
- Iphimoides celebensis Jacoby, 1883

Genus of leaf beetles from Southeast Asia

Iphimoides is a genus of leaf beetles in the subfamily Eumolpinae. It is distributed in southeastern Asia and southern China.

== Species ==
Subgenus Iphimoides Jacoby, 1883

- Iphimoides binhanus Pic, 1928 – North Vietnam
- Iphimoides celebensis Jacoby, 1883 – Sulawesi
- Iphimoides fabianae Zoia, 2004 – Peninsular Malaysia
- Iphimoides fulvus Medvedev, 2004 – Laos
- Iphimoides pallidulus (Jacoby, 1889) – Burma, Vietnam, southern China

Subgenus Clisitherella Chen, 1940

- Iphimoides suturalis Pic, 1928 – China, Vietnam

Synonyms:

- Iphimoides cheni Medvedev, 2000: synonym of Iphimoides suturalis Pic, 1928
- Iphimoides fukienensis (Tan, 1983): synonym of Iphimoides suturalis Pic, 1928
- Iphimoides suturalis (Chen, 1940): synonym of Iphimoides suturalis Pic, 1928
