= Dumbea (beetle) =

Scientific classification
- Kingdom: Animalia
- Phylum: Arthropoda
- Clade: Pancrustacea
- Class: Insecta
- Order: Coleoptera
- Suborder: Polyphaga
- Infraorder: Cucujiformia
- Family: Chrysomelidae
- Subfamily: Eumolpinae
- Tribe: Eumolpini
- Genus: Dumbea; Jolivet, Verma & Mille, 2007

Type species
- Dumbea paulaudi Jolivet, Verma & Mille, 2007

Genus of leaf beetles from New Caledonia

Dumbea is a genus of leaf beetles in the subfamily Eumolpinae. It is known from the South Province and Mont Panié of New Caledonia, and is named after Dumbéa, a town nearby Nouméa. This name was originally used by the French entomologist Charles Adolphe Albert Fauvel to house several species of Eumolpinae from New Caledonia, but Fauvel's Dumbea was unpublished and is a nomen nudum. The genus was established based on general proportions and body size, and may be polyphyletic or paraphyletic.

== Species ==
- Dumbea gigas Jolivet, Verma & Mille, 2007
- Dumbea montana Jolivet, Verma & Mille, 2011
- Dumbea paulaudi Jolivet, Verma & Mille, 2007

Dumbea striata Jolivet, Verma & Mille, 2007 was transferred to the genus Cazeresia in 2025.
