= Abiromorphus =

Scientific classification
- Kingdom: Animalia
- Phylum: Arthropoda
- Clade: Pancrustacea
- Class: Insecta
- Order: Coleoptera
- Suborder: Polyphaga
- Infraorder: Cucujiformia
- Family: Chrysomelidae
- Subfamily: Eumolpinae
- Tribe: Eumolpini
- Genus: Abiromorphus; Pic, 1924

Type species
- Abiromorphus anceyi Pic, 1924

Genus of leaf beetles from Asia

Abiromorphus is a genus of leaf beetles in the subfamily Eumolpinae, including two species found in eastern Asia. It was first described by the French entomologist Maurice Pic in 1924 for a single species from China. It is similar to Abirus, and is distinguished by simple tarsal claws and thick femurs.

== Species ==
- Abiromorphus anceyi Pic, 1924 – China (Jiangsu, Jilin, Zhejiang), North Korea, South Korea, Russia (Far East)
- Abiromorphus vietnamicus Medvedev, 2015 – Northern Vietnam (Cao Bằng Province)

== Host plants ==
A. anceyi has been reported on plants of the genera Prunus, Salix, Populus and Ziziphus.
