= Olorus (beetle) =

Scientific classification
- Kingdom: Animalia
- Phylum: Arthropoda
- Clade: Pancrustacea
- Class: Insecta
- Order: Coleoptera
- Suborder: Polyphaga
- Infraorder: Cucujiformia
- Family: Chrysomelidae
- Subfamily: Eumolpinae
- Tribe: Eumolpini
- Genus: Olorus; Chapuis, 1874

Type species
- Olorus femoralis Chapuis, 1874

Synonyms
- Nephus Jacoby, 1889 (nec Mulsant, 1846); Nephiusus Jacoby, 1892; Autolampra Jacoby, 1908

Genus of leaf beetles from Asia

Olorus is a genus of leaf beetles in the subfamily Eumolpinae. It is found in Asia.

== Species ==
- Olorus dentipes Tan, 1984
- Olorus femoralis Chapuis, 1874

Synonyms:

- Olorus speciosus Berlioz, 1917: synonym of Olorus femoralis Chapuis, 1874
- Olorus femoratus (Jacoby, 1889): synonym of Olorus femoralis Chapuis, 1874
