= Hermesia (beetle) =

Scientific classification
- Kingdom: Animalia
- Phylum: Arthropoda
- Clade: Pancrustacea
- Class: Insecta
- Order: Coleoptera
- Suborder: Polyphaga
- Infraorder: Cucujiformia
- Family: Chrysomelidae
- Subfamily: Eumolpinae
- Tribe: Eumolpini
- Genus: Hermesia; Lefèvre, 1877

Type species
- Colaspis aurata Olivier, 1808

Genus of leaf beetles

Hermesia is a genus of leaf beetles in the subfamily Eumolpinae. It is found in Central America and South America.

The genus was previously considered a synonym of Hylax, but in 1995 it was restored as a separate genus.

== Species ==
As of 1995, Hermesia contains three species (country records from Jan Bechyné's 1953 catalog):

- Hermesia aurata (Olivier, 1808) (Synonym: Chalcophana nitidissimus Erichson, 1847) – Guyana, Colombia, Ecuador, Peru, Bolivia, Brazil
- Hermesia cyanea Bowditch, 1921 – Brazil
- Hermesia inermis Bowditch, 1921 (Synonym: Rhabdopterus violaceus Jacoby, 1882) – Colombia, Panama, Costa Rica
