= Kumatoeides =

Scientific classification
- Kingdom: Animalia
- Phylum: Arthropoda
- Clade: Pancrustacea
- Class: Insecta
- Order: Coleoptera
- Suborder: Polyphaga
- Infraorder: Cucujiformia
- Family: Chrysomelidae
- Subfamily: Eumolpinae
- Tribe: Eumolpini
- Genus: Kumatoeides; Gómez-Zurita, 2018

Type species
- Kumatoeides aulacia Gómez-Zurita, 2018

Genus of leaf beetles from New Caledonia

Kumatoeides is a genus of leaf beetles in the subfamily Eumolpinae. The genus is endemic to New Caledonia. The genus was first erected in 2018 by Spanish entomologist Jesús Gómez-Zurita. The generic name is the Latin transliteration of the Greek adjective κυματοειδής, meaning "corrugated", referring to the regular striae on the elytra of the beetles.

== Species ==
- Kumatoeides anomala Gómez-Zurita, 2018
- Kumatoeides aulacia Gómez-Zurita, 2018
- Kumatoeides costata (Jolivet, Verma & Mille, 2007)
- Kumatoeides leptalei Gómez-Zurita, 2018
- Kumatoeides megale Gómez-Zurita, 2018
- Kumatoeides metallica Gómez-Zurita, 2018
- Kumatoeides millei Gómez-Zurita, 2018
- Kumatoeides tarsalis Gómez-Zurita, 2018
- Kumatoeides wanati Gómez-Zurita, 2018
