= Ischyrolampra =

Scientific classification
- Kingdom: Animalia
- Phylum: Arthropoda
- Clade: Pancrustacea
- Class: Insecta
- Order: Coleoptera
- Suborder: Polyphaga
- Infraorder: Cucujiformia
- Family: Chrysomelidae
- Subfamily: Eumolpinae
- Tribe: Eumolpini
- Genus: Ischyrolampra; Lefèvre, 1885

Type species
- Eulampra batesi Baly, 1878

Synonyms
- Eulampra Baly, 1878 (nec Chaudoir, 1848)

Genus of leaf beetles from South America

Ischyrolampra is a genus of leaf beetles in the subfamily Eumolpinae. It is found in South America.

== Species ==
- Ischyrolampra batesi (Baly, 1878) – Brazil (Amazonas), Peru
- Ischyrolampra clavicornis (Bechyné, 1951) – Bolivia, Argentina, Paraguay
- Ischyrolampra rosalei Bechyné & Bechyné, 1967 – Venezuela
