= Anachalcoplacis =

Scientific classification
- Kingdom: Animalia
- Phylum: Arthropoda
- Clade: Pancrustacea
- Class: Insecta
- Order: Coleoptera
- Suborder: Polyphaga
- Infraorder: Cucujiformia
- Family: Chrysomelidae
- Subfamily: Eumolpinae
- Tribe: Eumolpini
- Genus: Anachalcoplacis; B. Bechyné, 1983

Type species
- Lamprosphaerus amazonicus Jacoby, 1899

Genus of beetles

Anachalcoplacis is a genus of leaf beetles in the subfamily Eumolpinae. It is known from South America.

== Species ==
- Anachalcoplacis amazonica (Jacoby, 1899) – Brazil
- Anachalcoplacis andicola (Bechyné, 1950) – Peru, Bolivia
- Anachalcoplacis clermonti (Bechyné, 1954)
  - Anachalcoplacis clermonti clermonti (Bechyné, 1954) – Brazil, Argentina
  - Anachalcoplacis clermonti minutula (Bechyné, 1965) – Brazil
- Anachalcoplacis concinna (Weise, 1921) – Brazil
- Anachalcoplacis fulva (Fabricius, 1801)
  - Anachalcoplacis fulva fulva (Fabricius, 1801) – Venezuela, Trinidad, Suriname, French Guiana, Brazil, Peru
  - Anachalcoplacis fulva grandis B. Bechyné, 1983 – Venezuela
  - Anachalcoplacis fulva macrosoma (Bechyné, 1958) – Brazil
  - Anachalcoplacis fulva melanitarsis (Bechyné, 1958) – Bolivia, Peru, Brazil
- Anachalcoplacis tenella B. Bechyné, 1983 – Venezuela
