= Édouard Lefèvre =

French botanist and entomologist (1839–1894)

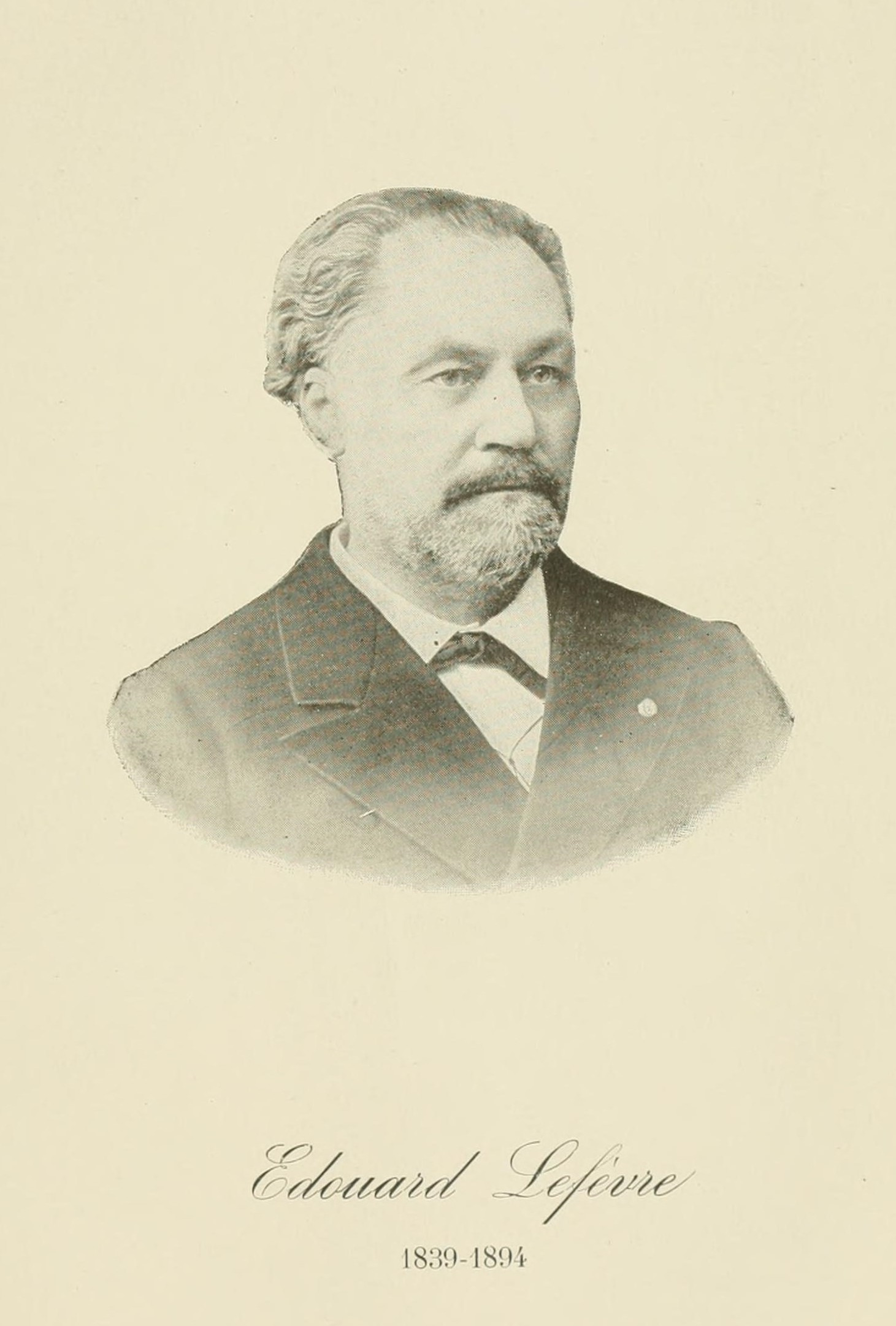
- Born: Édouard Aimable Edmond Lefèvre; 23 January 1839; Chartres
- Died: 17 June 1894; Paris
- Occupations: Entomologist, botanist, civil servant

Édouard Aimable Edmond Lefèvre (23 January 1839 – 17 June 1894) was a French botanist and later entomologist who specialised in Coleoptera. He became a member of the Entomological Society of France in 1869, and twice served as president of the society in 1884 and 1893.

He was a civil servant.

The standard author abbreviation E. Lefèvre is used to indicate this person as the author when citing a botanical name.
