= List of Malthinus species =

This is a list of 144 species in Malthinus, a genus of soldier beetles in the family Cantharidae.

== Malthinus species ==
- Malthinus aetolicus Wittmer, 1974^{g}
- Malthinus alexanderi Fender, 1966^{i g}
- Malthinus armipes Kiesenwetter, 1871^{g}
- Malthinus aspoecki Wittmer, 1974^{g}
- Malthinus atripennis LeConte, 1881^{i g}
- Malthinus axillaris Kiesenwetter, 1852^{g}
- Malthinus balteatus Suffrian, 1851^{g}
- Malthinus bandamensis Palm, 1975^{g}
- Malthinus bicolor (LeConte, 1884)^{i}
- Malthinus biglianii Fiori, 1915^{g}
- Malthinus biguttatus (Linnaeus, 1758)^{g}
- Malthinus bilineatus Kiesenwetter, 1852^{g}
- Malthinus brancuccii Wittmer, 1978^{g}
- Malthinus bulgaricus Svihla, 1990^{g}
- Malthinus chisosensis Fender, 1963^{i g}
- Malthinus cincticollis Kiesenwetter, 1865^{g}
- Malthinus conspicuus ^{g}
- Malthinus cordobensis Wittmer, 1971^{g}
- Malthinus corsicanus Constantin, 1975^{g}
- Malthinus creticus Wittmer, 1971^{g}
- Malthinus croceicollis Wollaston, 1862^{g}
- Malthinus cuspidatus Fender, 1963^{i g}
- Malthinus dalmatinus Pic, 1902^{g}
- Malthinus danieli (Kuśka & Kania, 2010)^{g}
- Malthinus danielssoni Wittmer, 1995^{g}
- Malthinus deceptor Baudi, 1893^{g}
- Malthinus depauperatus Wollaston, 1862^{g}
- Malthinus devillei Abeille de Perrin, 1898^{g}
- Malthinus difficilis LeConte, 1851^{i g b}
- Malthinus diffusus Kiesenwetter, 1865^{g}
- Malthinus dimorphus Wittmer, 1935^{g}
- Malthinus dromioides Bourgeois, 1885^{g}
- Malthinus dryocoetes Rottenberg, 1870^{g}
- Malthinus elbursensis Wittmer, 1978^{g}
- Malthinus espadanensis Wittmer, 1981^{g}
- Malthinus euboeicus Wittmer, 1974^{g}
- Malthinus expansus Wittmer, 1986^{g}
- Malthinus facialis Thomson, 1864^{g}
- Malthinus fasciatus (Olivier, 1790)^{g}
- Malthinus fenchihuensis Wittmer, 1979^{g}
- Malthinus fjellandi Fender, 1963^{i g}
- Malthinus flaveolus (Herbst, 1786)^{g}
- Malthinus foliiformis Wittmer, 1975^{g}
- Malthinus forcepiformis Wittmer, 1978^{g}
- Malthinus frontalis (Marsham, 1802)^{g}
- Malthinus fuerteventurensis Palm, 1975^{g}
- Malthinus ganglbaueri Wittmer, 1974^{g}
- Malthinus garganicus Fiori, 1915^{g}
- Malthinus geigei Wittmer, 1971^{g}
- Malthinus geniculatus Kiesenwetter, 1859^{g}
- Malthinus glabellus Kiesenwetter, 1852^{g}
- Malthinus graecus Wittmer, 1986^{g}
- Malthinus gratiosus Pic, 1901^{g}
- Malthinus huachucae Fender, 1951^{i g}
- Malthinus ilisicus Wittmer, 1974^{g}
- Malthinus insignipes Pic, 1907^{g}
- Malthinus ionicus Pic, 1901^{g}
- Malthinus israelsoni Palm, 1975^{g}
- Malthinus kafkai Svihla, 2002^{g}
- Malthinus khuzistanicus Wittmer, 1972^{g}
- Malthinus kiesenwetteri C.Brisout de Barneville, 1863^{g}
- Malthinus knulli Fender, 1963^{i g}
- Malthinus kraatzi Pic, 1900^{g}
- Malthinus lacteifrons Marseul, 1878^{g}
- Malthinus laevicollis Kiesenwetter, 1859^{g}
- Malthinus laticollis Pic, 1900^{g}
- Malthinus lindbergi Palm, 1975^{g}
- Malthinus lituratus Motschulsky, 1853^{g}
- Malthinus longicornis Kiesenwetter, 1865^{g}
- Malthinus madoniensis Svihla, 2002^{g}
- Malthinus malkini Wittmer, 1986^{g}
- Malthinus mandli Wittmer, 1966^{g}
- Malthinus marginicollis Ganglbauer, 1906^{g}
- †Malthinus masoni Pankowski & Fanti, 2022^{g}
- Malthinus maspalomensis Palm, 1975^{g}
- Malthinus minimus Palm, 1975^{g}
- Malthinus moravicus Svihla, 1997^{g}
- Malthinus mucoreus Kiesenwetter, 1879^{g}
- Malthinus multinotatus Pic, 1929^{g}
- Malthinus mutabilis Wollaston, 1862^{g}
- Malthinus neapolitanus Pic, 1905^{g}
- Malthinus neglectus Palm, 1975^{g}
- Malthinus nigerrimus Constantin, 1975^{g}
- Malthinus nigrescens Palm, 1975^{g}
- Malthinus notsui Wittmer, 1984^{g}
- Malthinus obscuripes Kiesenwetter, 1866^{g}
- Malthinus occipitalis LeConte, 1851^{i g b} (yellow-tipped soldier beetle)
- Malthinus ohbai Wittmer, 1984^{g}
- Malthinus olympiacus Wittmer, 1974^{g}
- Malthinus orbiculatus N.Takahashi^{g}
- Malthinus ornatus Rosenhauer, 1856^{g}
- Malthinus palingensis Wittmer, 1993^{g}
- Malthinus pallidipes Fairmaire, 1884^{g}
- Malthinus panachaicus Wittmer, 1974^{g}
- Malthinus parallelus Wittmer, 1974^{g}
- Malthinus parnassicus Wittmer, 1974^{g}
- Malthinus persicus Pic, 1901^{g}
- Malthinus pseudobiguttatus Constantin, 1975^{g}
- Malthinus pseudopersicus Wittmer, 1972^{g}
- Malthinus pseudoreflexus Svihla, 1994^{g}
- Malthinus pseudoscriptus Wittmer, 1971^{g}
- Malthinus punctatus (Geoffroy, 1785)^{g}
- Malthinus quadrimaculatus Fender, 1951^{i g}
- Malthinus rauschi Wittmer, 1978^{g}
- Malthinus reductelineatus Pic, 1922^{g}
- Malthinus reflexus Wittmer, 1974^{g}
- Malthinus rhaphidiceps Kiesenwetter, 1852^{g}
- Malthinus robustus Motschulsky, 1853^{g}
- Malthinus rothi Fender, 1972^{i g}
- Malthinus rubricollis Baudi di Selve, 1859^{g}
- Malthinus rufifrons (Motschulsky, 1859)^{g}
- Malthinus sancticatalinus Fender, 1972^{i g}
- Malthinus sanpedroensis Wittmer, 1971^{g}
- Malthinus scapularis Marseul, 1877^{g}
- Malthinus schoeni Svihla, 2002^{g}
- Malthinus scriptipennis Pic, 1900^{g}
- Malthinus scriptoides Wittmer, 1971^{g}
- Malthinus scriptus Kiesenwetter, 1852^{g}
- Malthinus scutellaris Rosenhauer, 1856^{g}
- Malthinus seriepunctatus Kiesenwetter, 1851^{g}
- Malthinus serrulatus N.Takahashi^{g}
- Malthinus shimomurai Wittmer, 1984^{g}
- Malthinus sicanus Kiesenwetter, 1871^{g}
- Malthinus simplicipes Pic, 1899^{g}
- Malthinus sinensis Pic, 1910^{g}
- Malthinus sordidus Kiesenwetter, 1871^{g}
- Malthinus sowerestanus Fender, 1972^{i g}
- Malthinus ssulingensis Wittmer, 1993^{g}
- Malthinus stigmatus Kiesenwetter, 1866^{g}
- Malthinus subcostatus Schaeffer, 1908^{i g}
- Malthinus taiwanoniger Wittmer, 1979^{g}
- Malthinus taiwanus Wittmer, 1984^{g}
- Malthinus temperei Constantin, 1975^{g}
- Malthinus texanus Wittmer, 1981^{i g b}
- Malthinus tricolor Fender, 1951^{i g}
- Malthinus trinotaticeps Pic, 1951^{g}
- Malthinus turcicus Pic, 1899^{g}
- Malthinus validiceps Pic, 1928^{g}
- Malthinus vartiani Wittmer, 1966^{g}
- Malthinus versatilis Delkeskamp, 1939^{g}
- Malthinus verticalis Pic, 1930^{g}
- Malthinus vitellinus Kiesenwetter, 1865^{g}
- Malthinus vixlimbatus Wittmer, 1984^{g}
- Malthinus wewalkai Wittmer, 1980^{g}
- Malthinus yangmingensis Wittmer, 1984^{g}

Data sources: i = ITIS, c = Catalogue of Life, g = GBIF, b = Bugguide.net
