= Metaparia =

Scientific classification
- Kingdom: Animalia
- Phylum: Arthropoda
- Clade: Pancrustacea
- Class: Insecta
- Order: Coleoptera
- Suborder: Polyphaga
- Infraorder: Cucujiformia
- Family: Chrysomelidae
- Subfamily: Eumolpinae
- Tribe: Eumolpini
- Genus: Metaparia; Crotch, 1873

Type species
- Metaparia clytroides Crotch, 1873

Synonyms
- Spintherophyta Lefèvre, 1875 (nec Dejean, 1836); Phytospinthera Monrós & Bechyné, 1956

Genus of leaf beetles

Metaparia is a genus of leaf beetles in the subfamily Eumolpinae. There are nine described species in Metaparia, distributed from the United States to Central America.

== Species ==
These nine species belong to the genus Metaparia:

- Metaparia cephalotes (Lefèvre, 1877) – Mexico
- Metaparia clytroides Crotch, 1873^{i c g b} – United States
- Metaparia guatemalensis (Jacoby, 1881) – Costa Rica, Guatemala, Mexico
- Metaparia hybrida (Jacoby, 1881) – Guatemala, Mexico
- Metaparia lesueuri (Lefèvre, 1875) – Guatemala, Honduras, Mexico
- Metaparia mandibuloflexa Sublett, Schultz, & Cook, 2021 – Mexico, United States
- Metaparia opacicollis (Horn, 1892)^{i c g b} – United States
- Metaparia prosopis Sublett, Schultz, & Cook, 2021 – Mexico, United States
- Metaparia viridimicans (Horn, 1892)^{i c g b} – Mexico, United States

The following species have been moved to other genera:

- Metaparia distincta (Jacoby, 1881): moved to Brachypnoea
- Metaparia fulvicornis (Jacoby, 1890): moved to Spintherophyta, renamed to Spintherophyta jacobyi Sublett & Cook, 2021
- Metaparia laevicollis (Jacoby, 1881): moved to Dispardentium
- Metaparia thoracica (Jacoby, 1881): moved to Spintherophyta
- Metaparia violacea (Jacoby, 1890): moved to Spintherophyta

Data sources: i = ITIS, c = Catalogue of Life, g = GBIF, b = Bugguide.net
