= Metachroma orientale =

Scientific classification
- Kingdom: Animalia
- Phylum: Arthropoda
- Clade: Pancrustacea
- Class: Insecta
- Order: Coleoptera
- Suborder: Polyphaga
- Infraorder: Cucujiformia
- Family: Chrysomelidae
- Genus: Metachroma
- Species: M. orientale

Binomial name
- Metachroma orientale Blake, 1970

Synonyms
- Metachroma pallidum Crotch, 1873 (nec Say, 1824)

Species of beetle

Metachroma orientale is a species of leaf beetle. It is found in coastal states in the United States, ranging from Texas to Florida to Massachusetts. Its length is between 3.5 and 4.7 mm.
