= Metachroma suturale =

Scientific classification
- Kingdom: Animalia
- Phylum: Arthropoda
- Clade: Pancrustacea
- Class: Insecta
- Order: Coleoptera
- Suborder: Polyphaga
- Infraorder: Cucujiformia
- Family: Chrysomelidae
- Genus: Metachroma
- Species: M. suturale

Binomial name
- Metachroma suturale LeConte, 1858

Synonyms
- Metachroma aterrimum Horn, 1892; Metachroma dubiosum Crotch, 1873 (nec Say, 1824)

Species of beetle

Metachroma suturale is a species of leaf beetle. It is found in the United States, ranging from Arizona to Texas. Its length is between 4.8 and 6.4 mm.
