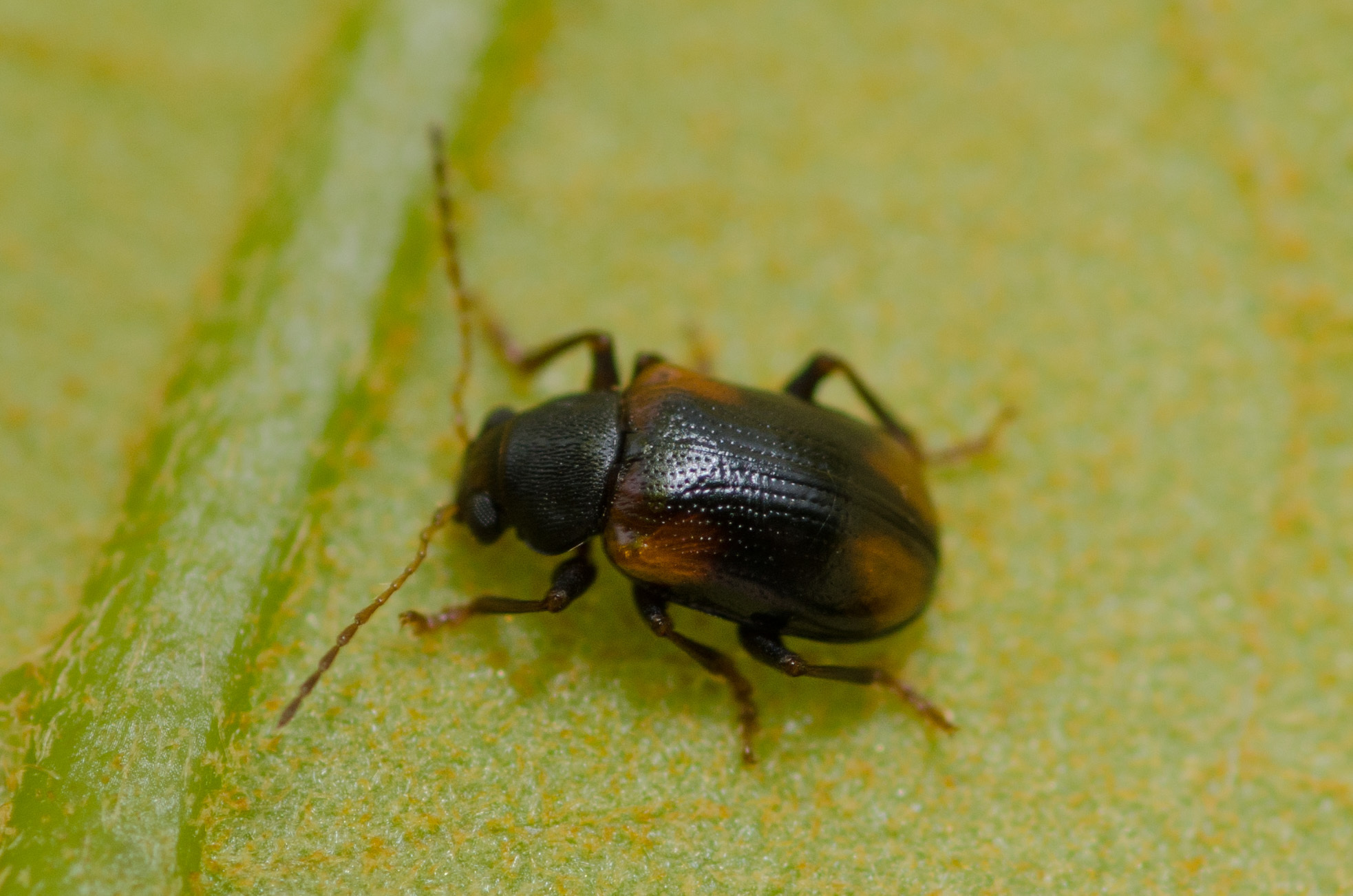
- Metachroma quercatum

Scientific classification
- Kingdom: Animalia
- Phylum: Arthropoda
- Clade: Pancrustacea
- Class: Insecta
- Order: Coleoptera
- Suborder: Polyphaga
- Infraorder: Cucujiformia
- Family: Chrysomelidae
- Subfamily: Eumolpinae
- Tribe: Typophorini
- Genus: Metachroma; Chevrolat in Dejean, 1836

Type species
- Colaspis quercata Fabricius, 1801

Synonyms
- Atrachela Gistel, 1848

= Metachroma =

Metachroma Temporal range: Eocene–Present

Genus of leaf beetles

Metachroma is a genus of leaf beetles in the subfamily Eumolpinae. It is distributed from Ontario, Canada to Mendoza, Argentina, including the Antilles (where a large number of species occur). It has also been suggested that the genus extends to the Pacific Islands, though this is not confirmed. There are about 140 described species in Metachroma, 40 of which are found north of Mexico. An extinct species is also known from the Eocene of the United States.

The name of the genus comes from the Ancient Greek μετα ("different") and χρῶμα ("color"), referring to the variations in color pattern found within many of the species.

== Species ==
- Metachroma acunai Blake, 1946
- Metachroma acutulum Blake, 1962
- Metachroma adustum Suffrian, 1866
- Metachroma amplicollis Blake, 1947
- Metachroma anaemicum Fall, 1927
- Metachroma angusticolle Blake, 1974
- Metachroma angustulum Crotch, 1873
- Metachroma annulare Blake, 1970
- Metachroma antennale Weise, 1885
- Metachroma argentinense Blake, 1970
- Metachroma ashtonae Blake, 1966
- Metachroma barahonense Blake, 1946
- Metachroma bimarginatum Blake, 1970
- Metachroma bipunctatum Jacoby, 1891
- Metachroma bredeni Blake, 1960
- Metachroma brevistriatum Blake, 1946
- Metachroma bridwelli Blake, 1970
- Metachroma californicum Crotch, 1873
- Metachroma carolinense Blake, 1970
- Metachroma cartagenense Blake, 1970
- Metachroma castaneum Blake, 1965
- Metachroma chapini Blake, 1944
- Metachroma cinctipes Blake, 1946
- Metachroma clarkei Blake, 1970
- Metachroma clarum Blake, 1970
- Metachroma convexum Jacoby, 1882
- Metachroma coronadense Fall, 1927
- Metachroma cornutum Blake, 1960
- Metachroma costaricanum Bechyné, 1958
- Metachroma darlingtoni Blake, 1946
- Metachroma dentatum Blake, 1965
- Metachroma dicoelotrachelus Blake, 1970
- Metachroma egleri Bechyné & Bechyné, 1961
- Metachroma ensiforma Blake, 1947
- Metachroma farri Blake, 1962
- Metachroma felis Blake, 1948
- Metachroma fenestratum Blake, 1947
- Metachroma flavolimbatum Blake, 1948
- Metachroma floridanum Crotch, 1873
- †Metachroma florissantensis Wickham, 1912
- Metachroma fuscifrons Blake, 1970
- Metachroma gagnei Blake, 1968
- Metachroma gracile Blake, 1937
- Metachroma grande Blake, 1960
- Metachroma guatemalense Jacoby, 1882
- Metachroma gundlachi Fernández García, 1998
- Metachroma hardwarense Blake, 1970
- Metachroma haydeni Blake, 1965
- Metachroma hirsutum Blake, 1970
- Metachroma hottense Blake, 1948
- Metachroma howdenae Blake, 1970
- Metachroma ignotum Blake, 1970
- Metachroma imitans Blake, 1947
- Metachroma immaculatum Blake, 1970
- Metachroma inconstans Blake, 1970
- Metachroma insulare Fall, 1927
- Metachroma interruptum (Say, 1824)
- Metachroma jacobyi Bechyné, 1955
- Metachroma labrale Blair, 1933
- Metachroma laevicolle Crotch, 1873
- Metachroma laevius Blake, 1946
- Metachroma laterale Crotch, 1873
- Metachroma leiotrachelus Blake, 1970
- Metachroma leonardi Blake, 1970
- Metachroma leucurum Blake, 1970
- Metachroma longicolle Jacoby, 1891
- Metachroma longicornis Blake, 1966
- Metachroma longipenne Blake, 1970
- Metachroma longipunctatum Blake, 1966
- Metachroma longitarsus Blake, 1946
- Metachroma longulum Horn, 1892
- Metachroma lucidum Blake, 1970
- Metachroma luridum (Olivier, 1808) (dark-sided metachroma)
- Metachroma macrum Blake, 1962
- Metachroma maculipenne Schwarz, 1878
- Metachroma magnipunctatum Blake, 1970
- Metachroma maniocae Blake, 1966
- Metachroma marginale Crotch, 1873
- Metachroma melanochrotum Blake, 1970
- Metachroma mendozae Blake, 1970
- Metachroma metrium Blake, 1947
- Metachroma mexicanum Jacoby, 1882
- Metachroma minutum Jacoby, 1882
- Metachroma moaense Blake, 1962
- Metachroma montanense Blake, 1970
- Metachroma multipunctatum Blake, 1960
- Metachroma mutabile Blake, 1970
- Metachroma nanum Blake, 1960
- Metachroma nassauense Blake, 1962
- Metachroma nigricollis Blake, 1970
- Metachroma nigromaculatum Blake, 1962
- Metachroma nigrosignatum Blake, 1970
- Metachroma nigroviride Blake, 1948
- Metachroma oakleyi Blake, 1970
- Metachroma obesum Blake, 1946
- Metachroma obscuricollis Blake, 1970
- Metachroma occidentale Blake, 1970
- Metachroma odontotum Blake, 1970
- Metachroma orientale Blake, 1970
- Metachroma ornatum Jacoby, 1891
- Metachroma oteroi Blake, 1944
- Metachroma pallidum (Say, 1824)
- Metachroma panamense Blake, 1970
- Metachroma paulum Blake, 1962
- Metachroma pellucidum Crotch, 1873
- Metachroma peninsulare Crotch, 1873
- Metachroma piceum Blake, 1948
- Metachroma presidiense Blake, 1970
- Metachroma prognathus Blake, 1970
- Metachroma quadrimaculatum Jacoby, 1891
- Metachroma quercatum (Fabricius, 1801)
- Metachroma quintanae Blake, 1970
- Metachroma regulare Jacoby, 1882
- Metachroma rhizophorae Blake, 1974
- Metachroma rosae Bryant, 1923
- Metachroma rugicollis Blake, 1970
- Metachroma rugosum Blake, 1962
- Metachroma sandersoni Blake, 1970
- Metachroma schwarzi Blake, 1948
- Metachroma septentrionale Blake, 1970
- Metachroma simile Blake, 1970
- Metachroma suturale LeConte, 1858
- Metachroma testaceum Blatchley, 1920
- Metachroma texanum Schaeffer, 1919
- Metachroma tricharthrum Blake, 1946
- Metachroma ustum LeConte, 1858
- Metachroma utahense Blake, 1970
- Metachroma variabile Jacoby, 1882
- Metachroma varium Blake, 1970
- Metachroma venezuelense Bechyné, 1953
- Metachroma viticola Linell, 1898
- Metachroma vittipennis Blake, 1970
- Metachroma vulgare Blake, 1970
- Metachroma wolcotti Bryant, 1926
- Metachroma xanthacrum Blake, 1947
- Metachroma zayasi Blake, 1960

The following five species from Cuba described by Suffrian in 1866, some of which were renamed by Clavareau in 1914, were considered doubtful by Doris Holmes Blake in her 1970 review of the genus. However, since she was not able to examine the original specimens for them, they remained unknown to her.

- Metachroma cubaecola Clavareau, 1914 (= Metachroma puncticolle Suffrian, 1866)
- Metachroma laeviasculum Suffrian, 1866
- Metachroma lituratum Suffrian, 1866
- Metachroma sordidum Suffrian, 1866
- Metachroma suffriani Clavareau, 1914 (= Metachroma suturale Suffrian, 1866)
