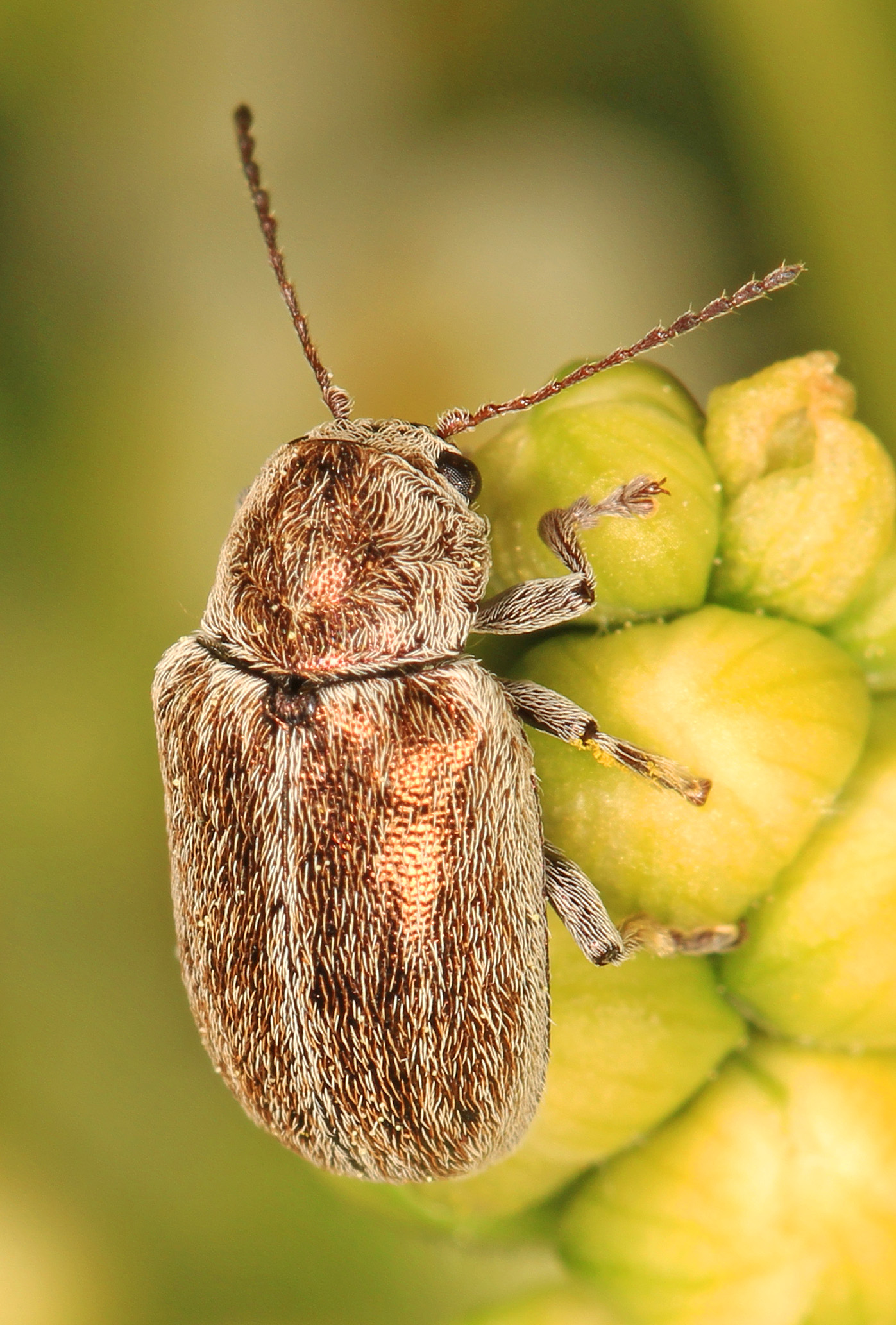

Scientific classification
- Kingdom: Animalia
- Phylum: Arthropoda
- Clade: Pancrustacea
- Class: Insecta
- Order: Coleoptera
- Suborder: Polyphaga
- Infraorder: Cucujiformia
- Family: Chrysomelidae
- Subfamily: Eumolpinae
- Tribe: Eumolpini
- Genus: Glyptoscelis; Chevrolat in Dejean, 1836

Type species
- Eumolpus hirtus (= Cryptocephalus pubescens Fabricius, 1777) Olivier, 1808

= Glyptoscelis =

Genus of leaf beetles

Glyptoscelis is a genus of leaf beetles in the subfamily Eumolpinae. There are 38 species of Glyptoscelis described from North, Central and South America. There are also three species of Glyptoscelis known from the West Indies, though they are wrongly placed in the genus. In addition, a single species was described from Hunan, China in 2021.

According to BugGuide and ITIS, the genus is now placed in the tribe Eumolpini instead of Adoxini.

== Species ==
These species belong to the genus Glyptoscelis:

- Glyptoscelis aeneipennis Baly, 1865
- Glyptoscelis albicans Baly, 1865^{i c g b}
- Glyptoscelis albida LeConte, 1859^{i c g b}
- Glyptoscelis alternata Crotch, 1873^{i c g b}
- Glyptoscelis aridis Van Dyke, 1938^{i c g}
- Glyptoscelis artemisiae Blake, 1967^{i c g}
- Glyptoscelis barbata (Say, 1826)^{i c g}
- Glyptoscelis cahitae Blake, 1967
- Glyptoscelis chontalensis Jacoby, 1882
- Glyptoscelis coloradoensis Blake, 1967^{i c g}
- Glyptoscelis cryptica (Say, 1824)^{i c g b}
- Glyptoscelis cylindrica Blake, 1967^{i c g}
- Glyptoscelis diabola Krauss, 1937^{i c g}
- Glyptoscelis dohrni Jacoby, 1900
- Glyptoscelis fascicularis Baly, 1865
- Glyptoscelis gayi Lefèvre, 1891
- Glyptoscelis gigas Jacoby, 1897
- Glyptoscelis guatemalensis Blake, 1967
- Glyptoscelis idahoensis Blake, 1967^{i c g}
- Glyptoscelis illustris Crotch, 1873^{i c g b}
- Glyptoscelis juniperi Blake, 1967^{i c g b}
- Glyptoscelis longior LeConte, 1878^{i c g}
- Glyptoscelis mexicana Jacoby, 1882
- Glyptoscelis monrosi Blake, 1952
- Glyptoscelis paraguayensis Jacoby, 1897
- Glyptoscelis parvula Blaisdell, 1921^{i c g}
- Glyptoscelis paula Blake, 1967^{i c g}
- Glyptoscelis peperi Blake, 1967^{i c g}
- Glyptoscelis pinnigera Blake, 1952
- Glyptoscelis prosopis Schaeffer, 1905^{i c g b}
- Glyptoscelis pubescens (Fabricius, 1777)^{i c g b} (hairy leaf beetle)
- Glyptoscelis pulvinosus (Blanchard, 1851)
- Glyptoscelis septentrionalis Blake, 1967^{i c g}
- Glyptoscelis sequoiae Blaisdell, 1921^{i c g}
- Glyptoscelis sinica Moseyko, 2021
- Glyptoscelis sonorensis Blake, 1967
- Glyptoscelis squamulata Crotch, 1873^{i c g b} (grape bud beetle)
- Glyptoscelis vandykei Krauss, 1937^{i c g}
- Glyptoscelis yosemitae Krauss, 1937^{i c g}

Data sources: i = ITIS, c = Catalogue of Life, g = GBIF, b = Bugguide.net

Three additional species have been described from the West Indies. According to Doris Holmes Blake, in her 1967 review of the genus, they are wrongly placed in it:

- Glyptoscelis brevicornis (Olivier, 1808)
- Glyptoscelis fusca (Drapiez, 1820)
- Glyptoscelis hobsoni (Curtis, 1840)
