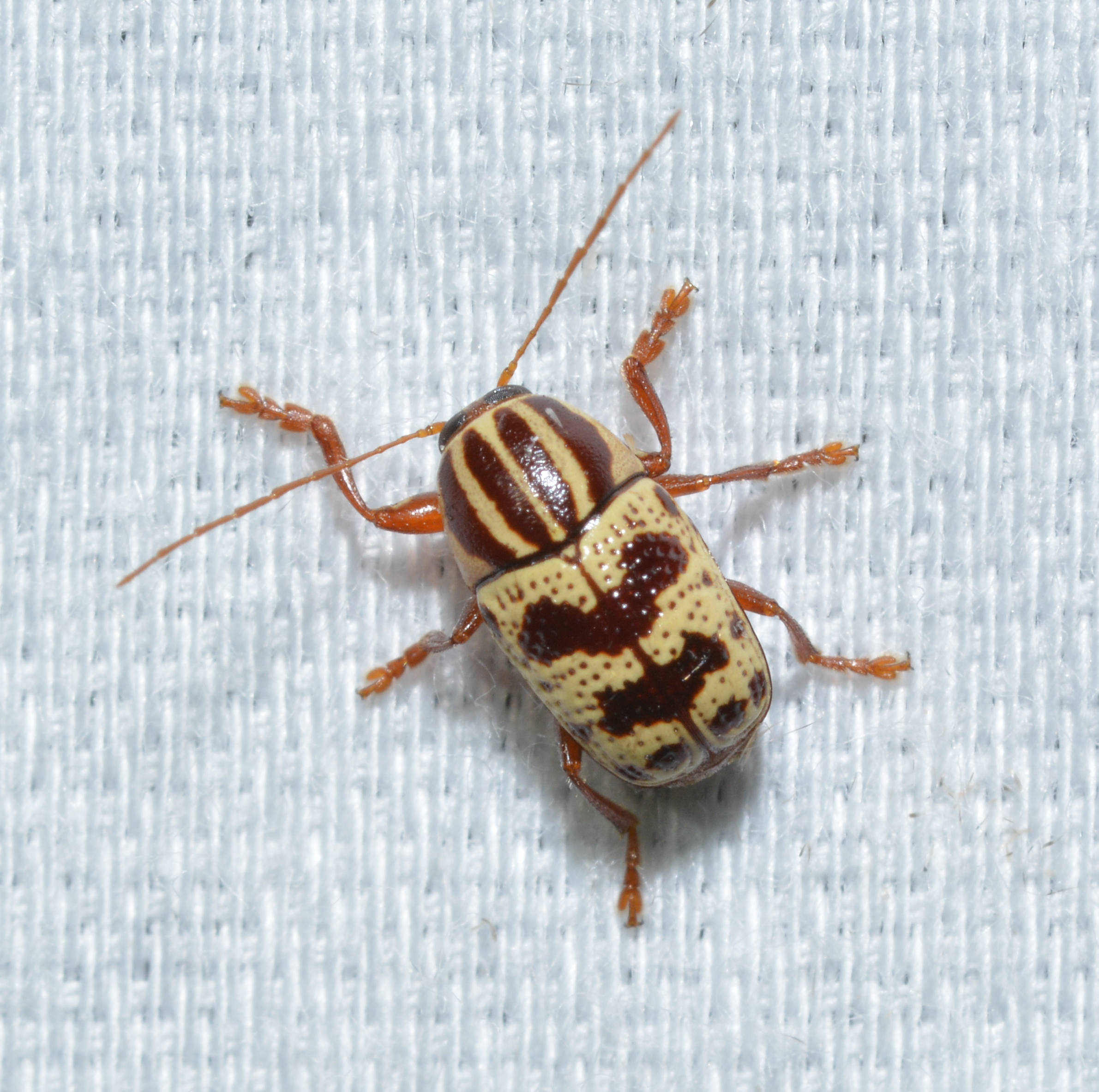

Scientific classification
- Kingdom: Animalia
- Phylum: Arthropoda
- Clade: Pancrustacea
- Class: Insecta
- Order: Coleoptera
- Suborder: Polyphaga
- Infraorder: Cucujiformia
- Family: Chrysomelidae
- Genus: Cryptocephalus
- Species: C. leucomelas

Binomial name
- Cryptocephalus leucomelas Suffrian, 1852

= Cryptocephalus leucomelas =

Species of beetle

Cryptocephalus leucomelas is a species of case-bearing leaf beetle in the family Chrysomelidae. It is found in North America (the United States and Canada). It measures 4.0–6.0 mm (0.16–0.24 in) in length.

== Subspecies ==
These three subspecies belong to the species Cryptocephalus leucomelas:

- Cryptocephalus leucomelas leucomelas Suffrian, 1852
- Cryptocephalus leucomelas trisignatus R. White, 1968
- Cryptocephalus leucomelas vitticollis J. L. LeConte, 1880
