= Alestrus =

Conservation status
- Data Deficient (IUCN 3.1)

Scientific classification
- Domain: Eukaryota
- Kingdom: Animalia
- Phylum: Arthropoda
- Class: Insecta
- Order: Coleoptera
- Suborder: Polyphaga
- Infraorder: Elateriformia
- Family: Elateridae
- Genus: Alestrus (Crotch, 1867)
- Species: A. dolosus

Binomial name
- Alestrus dolosus (Crotch, 1867)

Genus of beetles

Drouetius is a monotypic genus of click beetle. Its only described species, Alestrus dolosus is endemic to the Azores archipelago.
