= Glyptoscelis illustris =

Scientific classification
- Kingdom: Animalia
- Phylum: Arthropoda
- Clade: Pancrustacea
- Class: Insecta
- Order: Coleoptera
- Suborder: Polyphaga
- Infraorder: Cucujiformia
- Family: Chrysomelidae
- Genus: Glyptoscelis
- Species: G. illustris

Binomial name
- Glyptoscelis illustris Crotch, 1873

Species of beetle

Glyptoscelis illustris is a species of leaf beetle. Its range spans from California to Oregon in the United States.
