= Metachroma angustulum =

Scientific classification
- Kingdom: Animalia
- Phylum: Arthropoda
- Clade: Pancrustacea
- Class: Insecta
- Order: Coleoptera
- Suborder: Polyphaga
- Infraorder: Cucujiformia
- Family: Chrysomelidae
- Genus: Metachroma
- Species: M. angustulum

Binomial name
- Metachroma angustulum Crotch, 1873

Synonyms
- Metachroma parallelum Horn, 1892

Species of beetle

Metachroma angustulum is a species of leaf beetle. It is found in the United States.
