= Glyptoscelis alternata =

Scientific classification
- Kingdom: Animalia
- Phylum: Arthropoda
- Clade: Pancrustacea
- Class: Insecta
- Order: Coleoptera
- Suborder: Polyphaga
- Infraorder: Cucujiformia
- Family: Chrysomelidae
- Genus: Glyptoscelis
- Species: G. alternata

Binomial name
- Glyptoscelis alternata Crotch, 1873

Species of beetle

Glyptoscelis alternata is a species of leaf beetle. It is found in the western United States.
