= Brachypnoea lecontei =

- Brachypnoea lecontei

Scientific classification
- Kingdom: Animalia
- Phylum: Arthropoda
- Clade: Pancrustacea
- Class: Insecta
- Order: Coleoptera
- Suborder: Polyphaga
- Infraorder: Cucujiformia
- Family: Chrysomelidae
- Genus: Brachypnoea
- Species: B. lecontei

Binomial name
- Brachypnoea lecontei E. Riley, S. Clark & Seeno, 2003

Synonyms
- Colaspis humeralis J. L. LeConte, 1858 (nec Latreille, 1833)

Species of beetle

Brachypnoea lecontei is a species of leaf beetle. It occurs in the Great Plains of the United States. In Texas, it is known to feed on Texas live oak (Quercus fusiformis).

Brachypnoea lecontei was first described with the name "Colaspis humeralis" by John Lawrence LeConte in 1858. Before 2003, the species was considered a synonym of Brachypnoea puncticollis. A study of LeConte's type material at the Museum of Comparative Zoology confirmed that Colaspis humeralis LeConte, 1858 was in fact a valid species in the genus Brachypnoea. Because the name Colaspis humeralis LeConte, 1858 was also a primary junior homonym of Colaspis humeralis Latreille, 1833 (now Brachypnoea humeralis), LeConte's species was renamed to "Brachypnoea lecontei" in honor of the species' original author.
