= Promecosoma arizonae =

Scientific classification
- Kingdom: Animalia
- Phylum: Arthropoda
- Clade: Pancrustacea
- Class: Insecta
- Order: Coleoptera
- Suborder: Polyphaga
- Infraorder: Cucujiformia
- Family: Chrysomelidae
- Genus: Promecosoma
- Species: P. arizonae

Binomial name
- Promecosoma arizonae (Crotch, 1873)

Synonyms
- Colaspis arizonae Crotch, 1873; Metaxyonycha circumcincta Horn, 1892

Species of beetle

Promecosoma arizonae is a species of leaf beetle. It is found in southern Arizona and in New Mexico in the United States, as well as in Mexico.
