= Androlyperus =

Scientific classification
- Kingdom: Animalia
- Phylum: Arthropoda
- Clade: Pancrustacea
- Class: Insecta
- Order: Coleoptera
- Suborder: Polyphaga
- Infraorder: Cucujiformia
- Family: Chrysomelidae
- Subfamily: Galerucinae
- Tribe: Luperini
- Subtribe: Luperina
- Genus: Androlyperus; Crotch, 1873

Synonyms
- Malacamerus Wilcox, 1951

Genus of beetles

Androlyperus is a genus of skeletonizing leaf beetles in the family Chrysomelidae. There are about five described species in Androlyperus. They are found in North America and Mexico.

== Species ==
These five species belong to the genus Androlyperus:

- Androlyperus californicus (Schaeffer, 1906)
- Androlyperus fulvus Crotch, 1873
- Androlyperus incisus Schaeffer, 1906
- Androlyperus maculatus J. L. LeConte, 1883
- Androlyperus nigrescens (Schaeffer, 1906)
