= Spintherophyta =

Scientific classification
- Kingdom: Animalia
- Phylum: Arthropoda
- Clade: Pancrustacea
- Class: Insecta
- Order: Coleoptera
- Suborder: Polyphaga
- Infraorder: Cucujiformia
- Family: Chrysomelidae
- Subfamily: Eumolpinae
- Tribe: Eumolpini
- Genus: Spintherophyta; Dejean, 1836

Type species
- Colaspis semiaurata Klug, 1829

Synonyms
- Chrysodina Baly, 1864; Chalcoparia Crotch, 1873 (nec Cabanis, 1850)

Genus of leaf beetles

Spintherophyta is a genus of leaf beetles in the subfamily Eumolpinae. Most species in the genus are found in Central and South America, but there are also a few North American species.

== Species ==
These species belong to the genus Spintherophyta:

- Spintherophyta antennata (Lefèvre, 1887)
- Spintherophyta arizonensis Schultz, 1976^{i c g b}
- Spintherophyta atroviolacea (Jacoby, 1890)
- Spintherophyta aurichalcea (Germar, 1824)
- Spintherophyta callida (Bechyné, 1950)
- Spintherophyta championi (Jacoby, 1881)
- Spintherophyta collaris (Lefèvre, 1885)
- Spintherophyta corrusca (Lefèvre, 1877)
- Spintherophyta cribricollis (Lefèvre, 1889)
- Spintherophyta cyanipennis (Jacoby, 1890)
- Spintherophyta diversicornis (Jacoby, 1900)
- Spintherophyta erythropoda (Bechyné, 1953)
- Spintherophyta exigua Schultz, 1976^{i c g}
- Spintherophyta festiva (Lefèvre, 1877)
- Spintherophyta flavipes (Jacoby, 1881)
- Spintherophyta frontalis Lefèvre, 1877
- Spintherophyta fruhstorferi (Bechyné, 1955)
- Spintherophyta fulvicornis (Jacoby, 1890)
- Spintherophyta fuscitarsis (Lefèvre, 1877)
- Spintherophyta globosa (Olivier, 1808)^{i c g b}
- Spintherophyta granulata (Jacoby, 1890)
- Spintherophyta hoegei (Jacoby, 1881)
- Spintherophyta igneicollis (Baly, 1864)
- Spintherophyta ignita (Lefèvre, 1877)
- Spintherophyta jacobyi Sublett & Cook, 2021
- Spintherophyta jucunda (Lefèvre, 1885)
- Spintherophyta kirschi (Harold, 1874)
- Spintherophyta laevicollis (Lefèvre, 1885)
- Spintherophyta laevigata (Lefèvre, 1878)
- Spintherophyta lectiuncula (Bechyné, 1951)
  - Spintherophyta lectiuncula lectiuncula (Bechyné, 1951)
  - Spintherophyta lectiuncula polychromella Bechyné, 1958
- Spintherophyta limitropha (Bechyné, 1950)
- Spintherophyta lunai (Bechyné, 1951)
- Spintherophyta malaisei (Bechyné, 1949)
- Spintherophyta marginicollis (Jacoby, 1881)
- Spintherophyta melania (Bechyné, 1955)
- Spintherophyta minuta (Jacoby, 1881)
- Spintherophyta nana (Jacoby, 1890)
- Spintherophyta olaena (Bechyné, 1951)
- Spintherophyta opacicollis (Lefèvre, 1885)
- Spintherophyta opulenta (Lefèvre, 1877)
- Spintherophyta ornata (Jacoby, 1881)
- Spintherophyta ornaticollis (Jacoby, 1881)
- Spintherophyta paraguayensis (Jacoby, 1898)
- Spintherophyta parvula (Lefèvre, 1885)
  - Spintherophyta parvula crassa (Bechyné, 1955)
  - Spintherophyta parvula parvula (Lefèvre, 1885)
- Spintherophyta podtianguini (Bechyné, 1951)
- Spintherophyta praestans (Bechyné, 1950)
- Spintherophyta pubescens (Jacoby, 1881)
- Spintherophyta pucaya (Bechyné, 1955)
- Spintherophyta punctum Gilbert & Clark, 2020
- Spintherophyta purpurea (Harold, 1874)
- Spintherophyta purpureicollis (Jacoby, 1881)
- Spintherophyta pusilla (Jacoby, 1890)
- Spintherophyta querula (Bechyné, 1950)
- Spintherophyta reticulata (Lefèvre, 1885)
- Spintherophyta semiaurata (Klug, 1829)
- Spintherophyta servula (Lefèvre, 1887)
- Spintherophyta simplocarina (Bechyné, 1954)
- Spintherophyta subsericea (Bechyné, 1955)
- Spintherophyta sulcifrons (Harold, 1874)
- Spintherophyta surrabaya (Bechyné, 1955)
- Spintherophyta thoracica (Jacoby, 1881)
- Spintherophyta tibialis (Lefèvre, 1889)
- Spintherophyta trinidadensis (Bechyné, 1951)
- Spintherophyta versicolor (Lefèvre, 1876)
- Spintherophyta vicina (Jacoby, 1890)
- Spintherophyta violacea Jacoby, 1890
- Spintherophyta violaceipennis (Horn, 1892)^{i c g b}
- Spintherophyta viridiceps (Bechyné, 1950)
- Spintherophyta viridis (Lefèvre, 1876)

Data sources: i = ITIS, c = Catalogue of Life, g = GBIF, b = Bugguide.net

Synonyms:

- Spintherophyta alutacea (Jacoby, 1898): synonym of Spintherophyta opacicollis (Lefèvre, 1885)
- Spintherophyta cupriceps (Lefèvre, 1877): moved to Brachypnoea
- Spintherophyta fulgurans (Harold, 1874): synonym of Spintherophyta igneicollis (Baly, 1864)
- Spintherophyta incerta (Lefèvre, 1876): synonym of Spintherophyta igneicollis (Baly, 1864)
- Spintherophyta laticollis (Jacoby, 1900): synonym of Spintherophyta igneicollis (Baly, 1864)
- Spintherophyta maronica (Bechyné, 1950): synonym of Spintherophyta igneicollis (Baly, 1864)
- Spintherophyta nigrita (Baly, 1878): moved to Nycterodina
- Spintherophyta peruana (Jacoby, 1898): synonym of Spintherophyta igneicollis (Baly, 1864)
- Spintherophyta pilosa (Lefèvre, 1877): moved to Trichospinthera
- Spintherophyta punctatostriata (Lefèvre, 1875): moved to Nycterodina
- Spintherophyta subcostata (Jacoby, 1900): moved to Nycterodina
- Spintherophyta tarsalis (Lefèvre, 1885): moved to Nycterodina, synonym of Nycterodina nigrita (Baly, 1878)

Renamed species:

- Spintherophyta fulvicornis (Jacoby, 1890: 197) (secondary junior homonym of Spintherophyta fulvicornis (Jacoby, 1890: 185)), renamed to Spintherophyta jacobyi Sublett & Cook, 2021
