= Metaparia clytroides =

Scientific classification
- Kingdom: Animalia
- Phylum: Arthropoda
- Clade: Pancrustacea
- Class: Insecta
- Order: Coleoptera
- Suborder: Polyphaga
- Infraorder: Cucujiformia
- Family: Chrysomelidae
- Genus: Metaparia
- Species: M. clytroides

Binomial name
- Metaparia clytroides Crotch, 1873

Species of beetle

Metaparia clytroides is a species of leaf beetle. It is found in Colorado, Kansas, Nebraska, New Mexico and Texas.
