= Metachroma luridum =

Scientific classification
- Kingdom: Animalia
- Phylum: Arthropoda
- Clade: Pancrustacea
- Class: Insecta
- Order: Coleoptera
- Suborder: Polyphaga
- Infraorder: Cucujiformia
- Family: Chrysomelidae
- Genus: Metachroma
- Species: M. luridum

Binomial name
- Metachroma luridum (Olivier, 1808)

Synonyms
- Colaspis lurida Olivier, 1808; Metachroma vicinum Crotch, 1873

Species of beetle

Metachroma luridum, the dark-sided metachroma, is a species of leaf beetle. It is found in the eastern United States, where its range spans from Texas to Florida and New Jersey, and in Mexico. Its length is between 3.5 and 4.0 mm.
