= Metachroma floridanum =

Scientific classification
- Kingdom: Animalia
- Phylum: Arthropoda
- Clade: Pancrustacea
- Class: Insecta
- Order: Coleoptera
- Suborder: Polyphaga
- Infraorder: Cucujiformia
- Family: Chrysomelidae
- Genus: Metachroma
- Species: M. floridanum

Binomial name
- Metachroma floridanum Crotch, 1873

Species of beetle

Metachroma floridanum is a species of leaf beetle. Its distribution ranges from Florida to North Carolina in the United States.
