= Glyptoscelis squamulata =

Scientific classification
- Kingdom: Animalia
- Phylum: Arthropoda
- Clade: Pancrustacea
- Class: Insecta
- Order: Coleoptera
- Suborder: Polyphaga
- Infraorder: Cucujiformia
- Family: Chrysomelidae
- Genus: Glyptoscelis
- Species: G. squamulata

Binomial name
- Glyptoscelis squamulata Crotch, 1873

Species of beetle

Glyptoscelis squamulata, the grape bud beetle, is a leaf beetle. The species was first described by George Robert Crotch in 1873. It is found in the western United States.

In the 1920s to 1940s, G. squamulata was considered a major pest of table grapes in Coachella Valley of southern California. It is now considered to be a minor pest.
