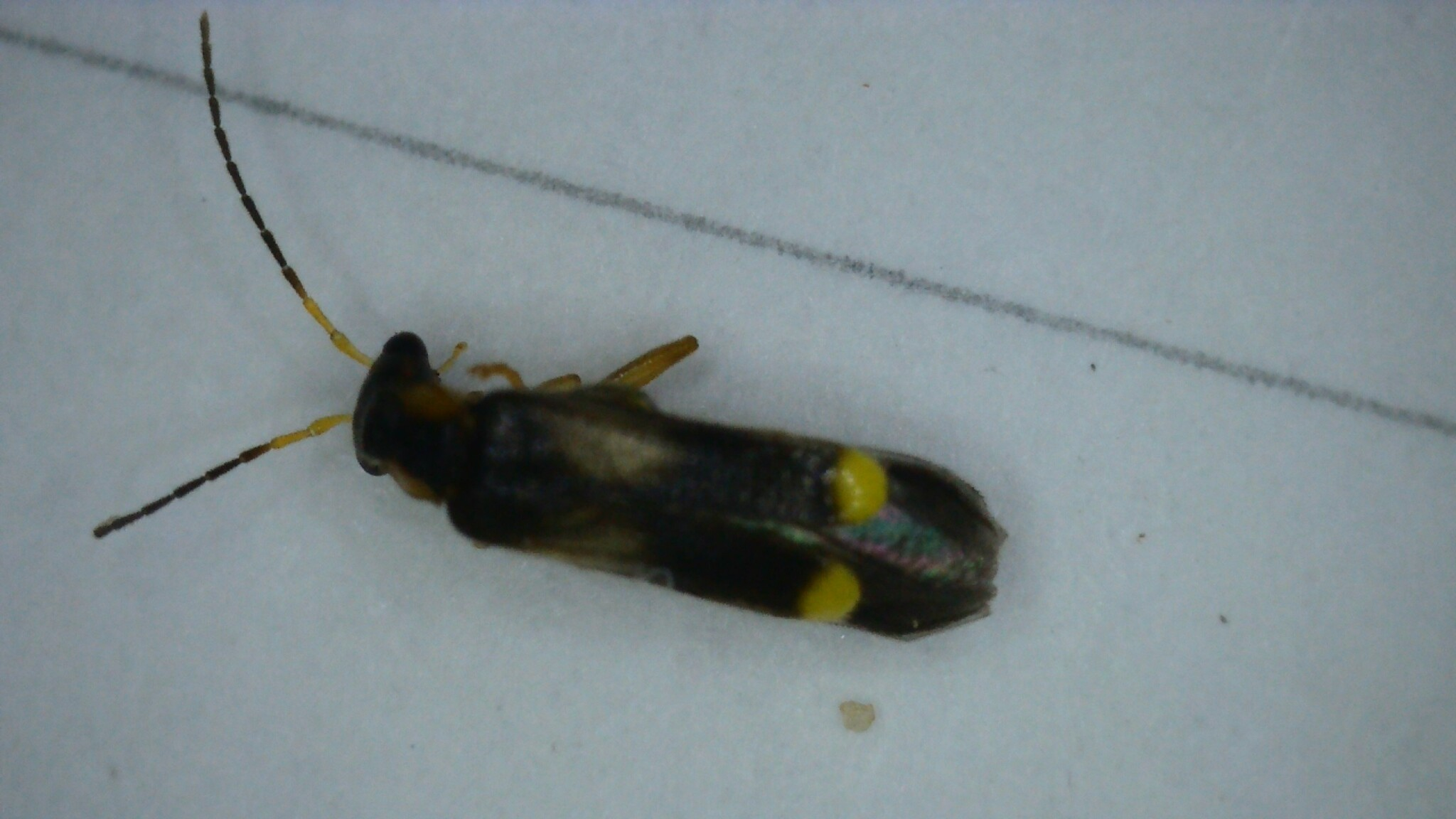

Scientific classification
- Kingdom: Animalia
- Phylum: Arthropoda
- Class: Insecta
- Order: Coleoptera
- Suborder: Polyphaga
- Infraorder: Elateriformia
- Family: Cantharidae
- Genus: Malthinus
- Species: M. balteatus

Binomial name
- Malthinus balteatus Suffrian, 1851

Synonyms
- Malthinus flaveolus (Herbst, 1786)

= Malthinus balteatus =

Species of beetle

Malthinus balteatus is a species of soldier beetle native to Europe.

This species is a saproxylic beetle, meaning that a portion of its lifespan feeds on dead, decomposing wood and fungi. Since they are populated in dense forests, they aid in nutrient recycling and are used as an indicator species. However, due to decreased management of European forests, their diversity is at risk.
