= Tymnes metasternalis =

Scientific classification
- Kingdom: Animalia
- Phylum: Arthropoda
- Clade: Pancrustacea
- Class: Insecta
- Order: Coleoptera
- Suborder: Polyphaga
- Infraorder: Cucujiformia
- Family: Chrysomelidae
- Genus: Tymnes
- Species: T. metasternalis

Binomial name
- Tymnes metasternalis (Crotch, 1873)

Synonyms
- Typophorus metasternalis Crotch, 1873

Species of beetle

Tymnes metasternalis is a species of leaf beetle. It is found in North America.
