= Promecosoma =

Scientific classification
- Kingdom: Animalia
- Phylum: Arthropoda
- Clade: Pancrustacea
- Class: Insecta
- Order: Coleoptera
- Suborder: Polyphaga
- Infraorder: Cucujiformia
- Family: Chrysomelidae
- Subfamily: Eumolpinae
- Tribe: Eumolpini
- Genus: Promecosoma; Lefèvre, 1877

Type species
- Promecosoma abdominale Lefèvre, 1877

Synonyms
- Promecosoma Chevrolat in Dejean, 1836 (nomen nudum)

Genus of leaf beetles

Promecosoma is a genus of leaf beetles in the subfamily Eumolpinae. There are 26 described species in Promecosoma. Most species are found in Mexico, though two species are also known from southern Arizona.

== Species ==
These species belong to the genus Promecosoma:

- Promecosoma abdominale Lefèvre, 1877
- Promecosoma acuminatum Weise, 1922
- Promecosoma arizonae (Crotch, 1873)^{i c b}
- Promecosoma chrysis Lefèvre, 1877
- Promecosoma cinctipenne Lefèvre, 1877
- Promecosoma dentatum Weise, 1922
- Promecosoma dilatatum Lefèvre, 1877
- Promecosoma dispar Lefèvre, 1877
- Promecosoma dugesi Lefèvre, 1877
- Promecosoma ecuadoriense Bechyné, 1953
- Promecosoma elegantulum Lefèvre, 1877
- Promecosoma emarginatum Weise, 1922
- Promecosoma fervidum Lefèvre, 1877
- Promecosoma flohri Jacoby, 1890
- Promecosoma inflatum Lefèvre, 1877^{i c g b}
- Promecosoma itatiaiense Bechyné, 1953
- Promecosoma jucundum Lefèvre, 1877
- Promecosoma lepidum Lefèvre, 1877
- Promecosoma lugens Lefèvre, 1877
- Promecosoma nobilitatum Lefèvre, 1877
- Promecosoma sallei Lefèvre, 1877
- Promecosoma sanguinolatum Lefèvre, 1877
- Promecosoma scutellare Lefèvre, 1877
- Promecosoma suturale Jacoby, 1890
- Promecosoma venezuelanum Bechyné, 1955
- Promecosoma viride Jacoby, 1881

Data sources: i = ITIS, c = Catalogue of Life, g = GBIF, b = Bugguide.net
