= Androlyperus fulvus =

Scientific classification
- Kingdom: Animalia
- Phylum: Arthropoda
- Clade: Pancrustacea
- Class: Insecta
- Order: Coleoptera
- Suborder: Polyphaga
- Infraorder: Cucujiformia
- Family: Chrysomelidae
- Genus: Androlyperus
- Species: A. fulvus

Binomial name
- Androlyperus fulvus Crotch, 1873

Species of beetle

Androlyperus fulvus is a species of skeletonizing leaf beetle in the family Chrysomelidae. It is found in the Western United States (California, Arizona).

Androlyperus fulvus measure 4.5–7.9 mm (0.18–0.31 in).
