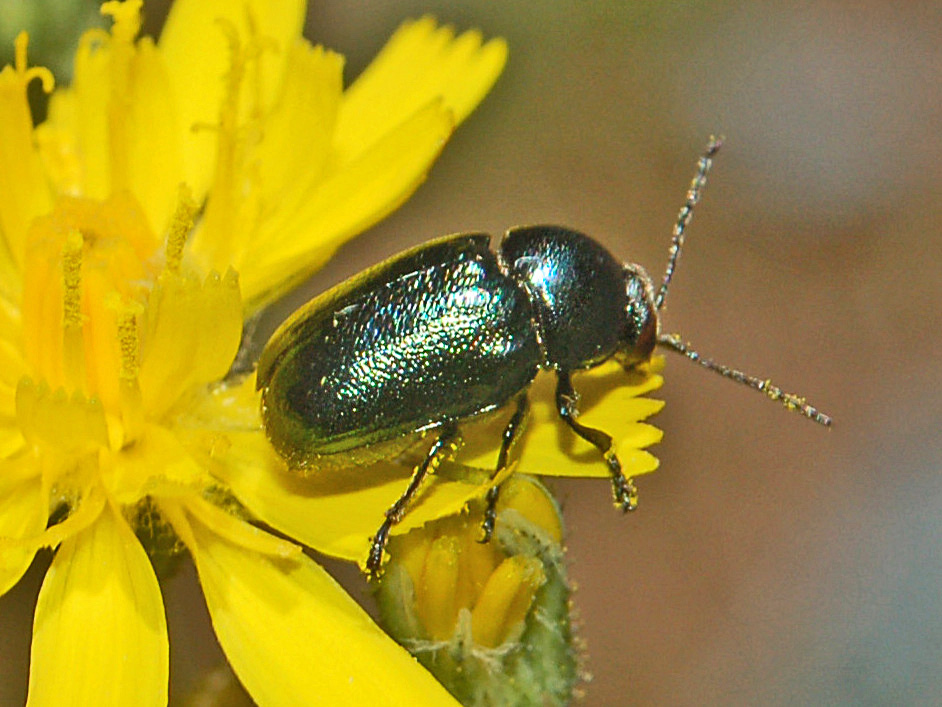
- Cryptocephalus cf. virens

Scientific classification
- Kingdom: Animalia
- Phylum: Arthropoda
- Clade: Pancrustacea
- Class: Insecta
- Order: Coleoptera
- Suborder: Polyphaga
- Infraorder: Cucujiformia
- Family: Chrysomelidae
- Genus: Cryptocephalus
- Species: C. virens

Binomial name
- Cryptocephalus virens Suffrian, 1847

= Cryptocephalus virens =

Species of beetle

Cryptocephalus virens is a cylindrical leaf beetle belonging to the family Chrysomelidae, subfamily Cryptocephalinae. The species was first described by Christian Wilhelm Ludwig Eduard Suffrian in 1847.

== Description ==
The females are usually slightly larger than the males. The colour of the head, pronotum and elytra is metallic green in the females, while in males the elytra are usually metallic blue. Adult beetles live from May to June, feeding mainly on nectar of Asteraceae species.

== Distribution ==
These beetles can be found in southern and central Europe from the Italian Alps and Bavaria to southern Poland, Russia, Turkey, the east Palearctic realm and the Near East. They prefer hilly and mountainous regions.
