= Metachroma pellucidum =

Scientific classification
- Kingdom: Animalia
- Phylum: Arthropoda
- Clade: Pancrustacea
- Class: Insecta
- Order: Coleoptera
- Suborder: Polyphaga
- Infraorder: Cucujiformia
- Family: Chrysomelidae
- Genus: Metachroma
- Species: M. pellucidum

Binomial name
- Metachroma pellucidum Crotch, 1873

Species of insect of the genus Metachroma

Metachroma pellucidum is a species of leaf beetle. It is mostly found in coastal states of the United States, ranging from Texas to Florida to New York, but is also found inland to Indiana. Its length is between 3.4 and 3.8 mm.
