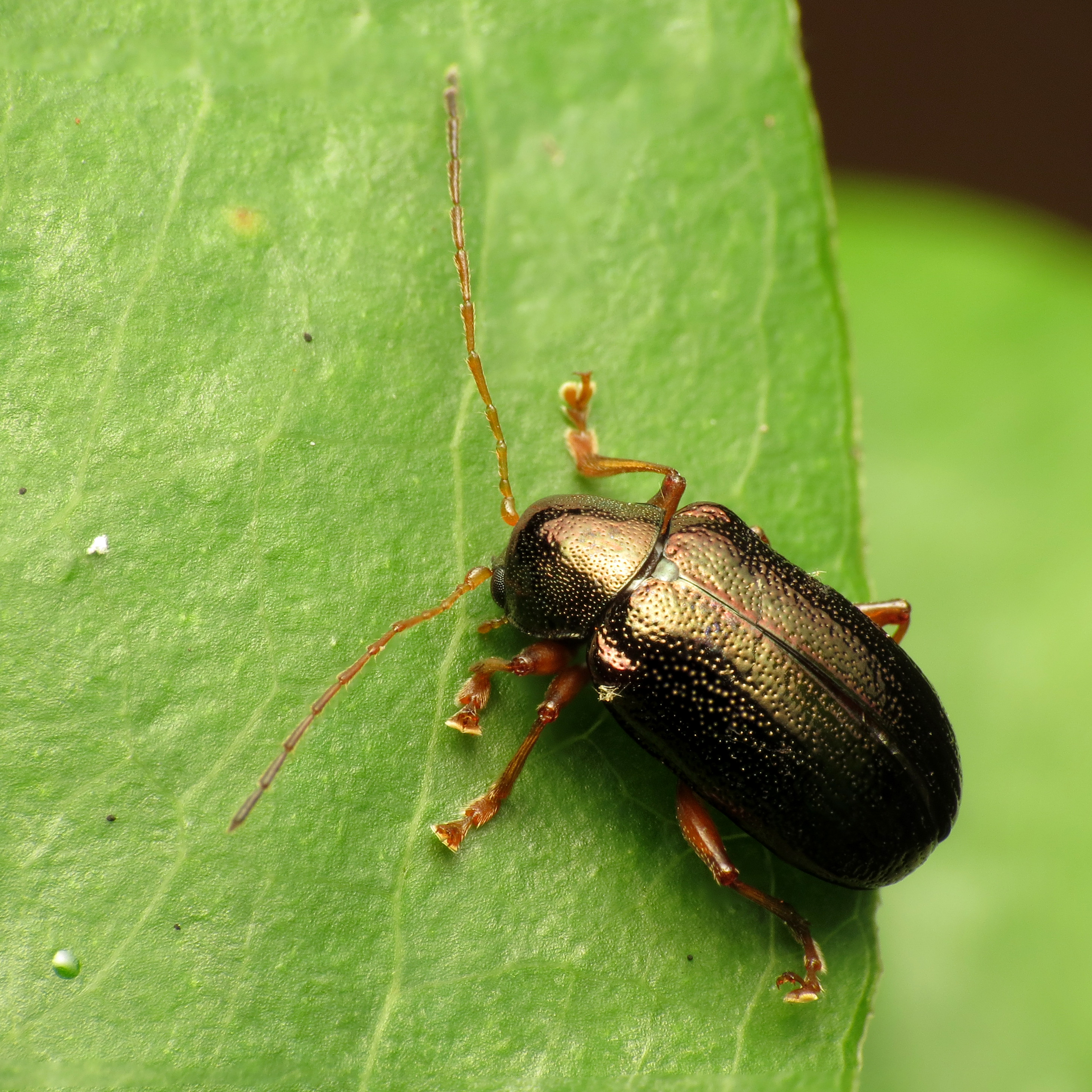

Scientific classification
- Kingdom: Animalia
- Phylum: Arthropoda
- Clade: Pancrustacea
- Class: Insecta
- Order: Coleoptera
- Suborder: Polyphaga
- Infraorder: Cucujiformia
- Family: Chrysomelidae
- Subfamily: Eumolpinae
- Tribe: Eumolpini
- Genus: Tymnes; Chapuis, 1874

Type species
- Tymnes verticalis (= Chrysomela tricolor Fabricius, 1792) Chapuis, 1874

= Tymnes =

Genus of leaf beetles

Tymnes is a genus of leaf beetles in the subfamily Eumolpinae. It is known from North America and Central America. There are at least nine described species in Tymnes.

== Gallery ==
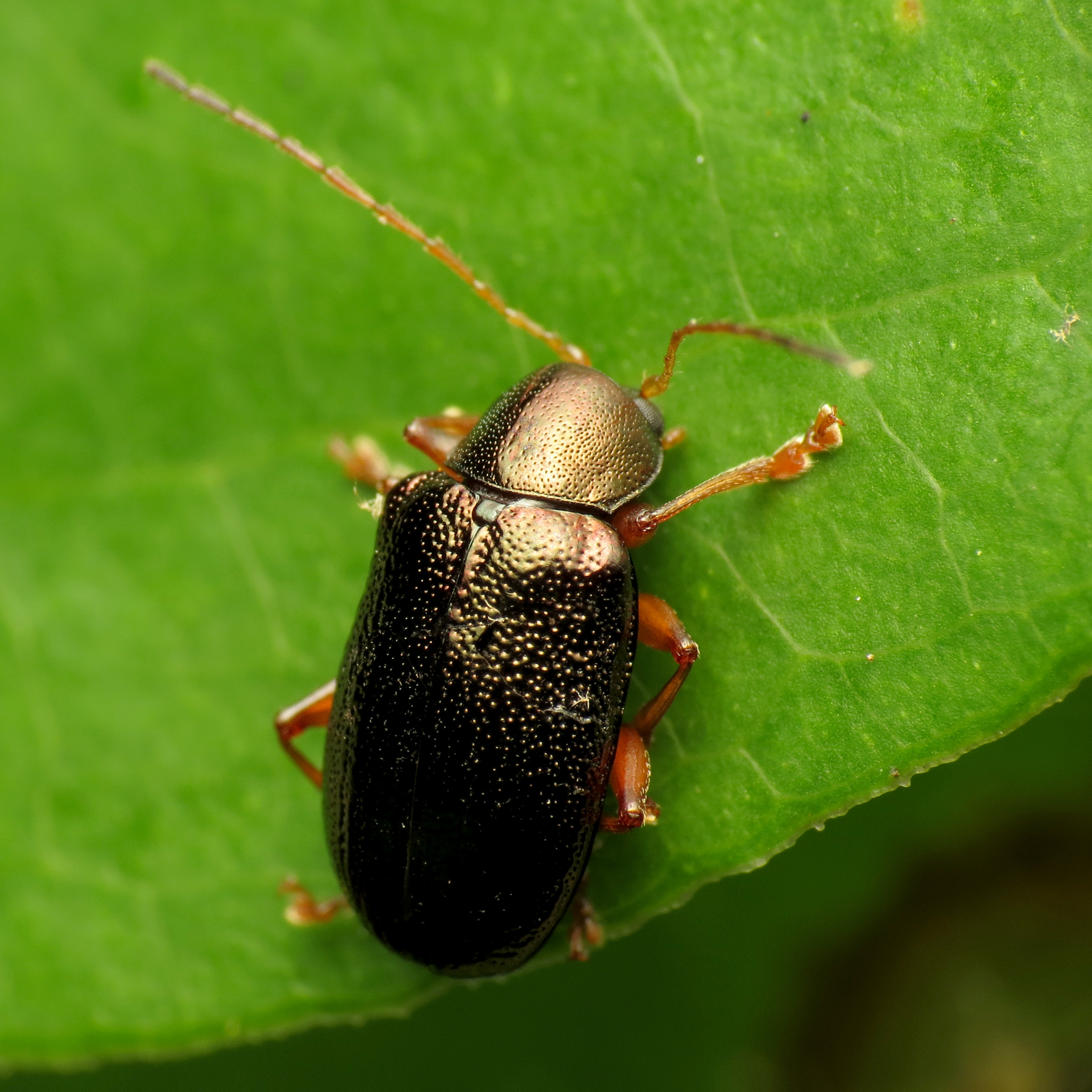

== Species ==
These species belong to the genus Tymnes:

- Tymnes chrysis (Olivier, 1808)^{i c g b} – United States
- Tymnes guatemalensis Bechyné, 1955 – Guatemala
- Tymnes metasternalis (Crotch, 1873)^{i c g b} – United States
- Tymnes omoplatus Lefèvre, 1885 – Mexico
- Tymnes oregonensis (Crotch, 1873)^{i c b} – United States
- Tymnes thaleia (Blake, 1977)^{i c g} – United States
- Tymnes tibialis Bechyné, 1955 – Mexico
- Tymnes tricolor (Fabricius, 1792)^{i c g b} – United States, Mexico
- Tymnes violaceus Horn, 1892^{i c g} – United States

Data sources: i = ITIS, c = Catalogue of Life, g = GBIF, b = Bugguide.net
