= Malthinus occipitalis =

Scientific classification
- Domain: Eukaryota
- Kingdom: Animalia
- Phylum: Arthropoda
- Class: Insecta
- Order: Coleoptera
- Suborder: Polyphaga
- Infraorder: Elateriformia
- Family: Cantharidae
- Genus: Malthinus
- Species: M. occipitalis

Binomial name
- Malthinus occipitalis LeConte, 1851

Species of beetle

Malthinus occipitalis, the yellow-tipped soldier beetle, is a species of soldier beetle in the family Cantharidae. It is found in North America.

== Subspecies ==
These three subspecies belong to the species Malthinus occipitalis:

- Malthinus occipitalis atripennis LeConte, 1851
- Malthinus occipitalis occipitalis LeConte, 1881
- Malthinus occipitalis woodruffi Wittmer, 1981
