= Metachroma viticola =

Scientific classification
- Kingdom: Animalia
- Phylum: Arthropoda
- Clade: Pancrustacea
- Class: Insecta
- Order: Coleoptera
- Suborder: Polyphaga
- Infraorder: Cucujiformia
- Family: Chrysomelidae
- Genus: Metachroma
- Species: M. viticola

Binomial name
- Metachroma viticola Linell, 1898

Species of beetle

Metachroma viticola is a species of leaf beetle. It is found along the Gulf Coast of the United States, particularly in Texas and Louisiana, and has also been reported from Mexico. Its length is between 4.0 and 5.8 mm (0.16 and 0.23 in). The species name, Latin for "grape vine dwelling", was chosen because the species was reported as injurious to grapes.
