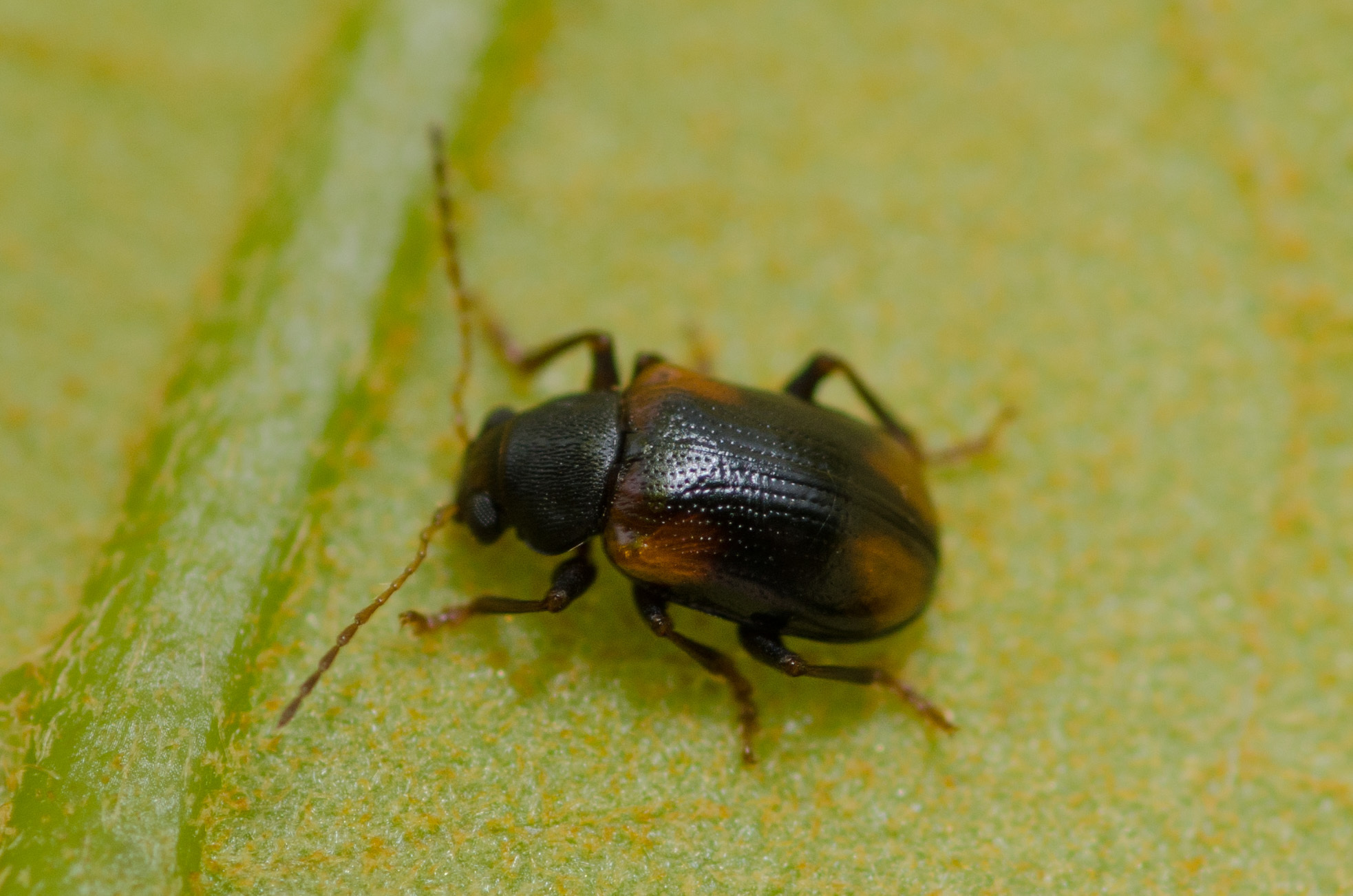

Scientific classification
- Kingdom: Animalia
- Phylum: Arthropoda
- Clade: Pancrustacea
- Class: Insecta
- Order: Coleoptera
- Suborder: Polyphaga
- Infraorder: Cucujiformia
- Family: Chrysomelidae
- Genus: Metachroma
- Species: M. quercatum

Binomial name
- Metachroma quercatum (Fabricius, 1801)

Synonyms
- Colaspis quercata Fabricius, 1801; Metachroma puncticolle LeConte, 1858; Metachroma strigicolle Blatchley, 1924

= Metachroma quercatum =

Species of beetle

Metachroma quercatum is a species of leaf beetle. It is found in the eastern United States, where its range spans from Texas to Florida and New York to Kansas. Its length is between 3.2 and 4.2 mm. The species is named after the scientific name of the oak (Quercus), one of the species' host plants.
