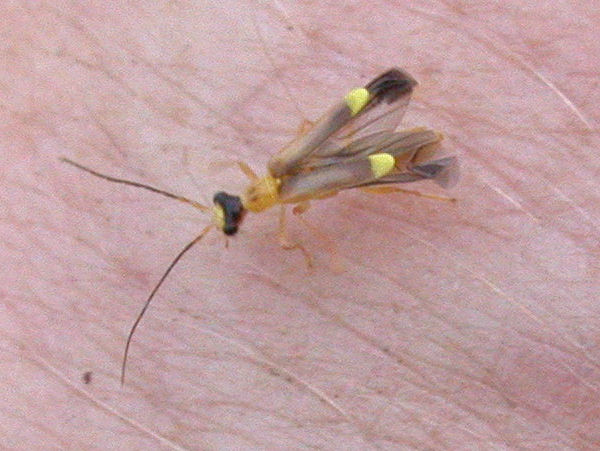

Scientific classification
- Kingdom: Animalia
- Phylum: Arthropoda
- Class: Insecta
- Order: Coleoptera
- Suborder: Polyphaga
- Infraorder: Elateriformia
- Family: Cantharidae
- Genus: Malthinus
- Species: M. flaveolus

Binomial name
- Malthinus flaveolus (Herbst, 1786)

= Malthinus flaveolus =

Species of beetle

Malthinus flaveolus is a species of soldier beetle native to Europe.
