= Metaparia viridimicans =

Scientific classification
- Kingdom: Animalia
- Phylum: Arthropoda
- Clade: Pancrustacea
- Class: Insecta
- Order: Coleoptera
- Suborder: Polyphaga
- Infraorder: Cucujiformia
- Family: Chrysomelidae
- Genus: Metaparia
- Species: M. viridimicans

Binomial name
- Metaparia viridimicans (Horn, 1892)

Synonyms
- Colaspoides macrocephalus Schaeffer, 1906; Colaspoides viridimicans Horn, 1892

Species of beetle

Metaparia viridimicans is a species of leaf beetle. It is found in the United States (New Mexico, Texas) and Mexico (Michoacán, Morelos, Tamaulipas).
