= Spintherophyta globosa =

Scientific classification
- Kingdom: Animalia
- Phylum: Arthropoda
- Clade: Pancrustacea
- Class: Insecta
- Order: Coleoptera
- Suborder: Polyphaga
- Infraorder: Cucujiformia
- Family: Chrysomelidae
- Genus: Spintherophyta
- Species: S. globosa

Binomial name
- Spintherophyta globosa (Olivier, 1808)

Synonyms
- Colaspis globosa Olivier, 1808; Colaspis ovata Say, 1824

Species of beetle

Spintherophyta globosa is a species of leaf beetle found in North America. It is widespread east of the Rocky Mountains, its range spanning from the East Coast west to Colorado and western Texas, and it may also occur in Arizona and Mexico. Its body is globose and colored black to dark brown, while the legs, antennae and mouth-parts are red-orange in color. The species is reported to be polyphagous.
