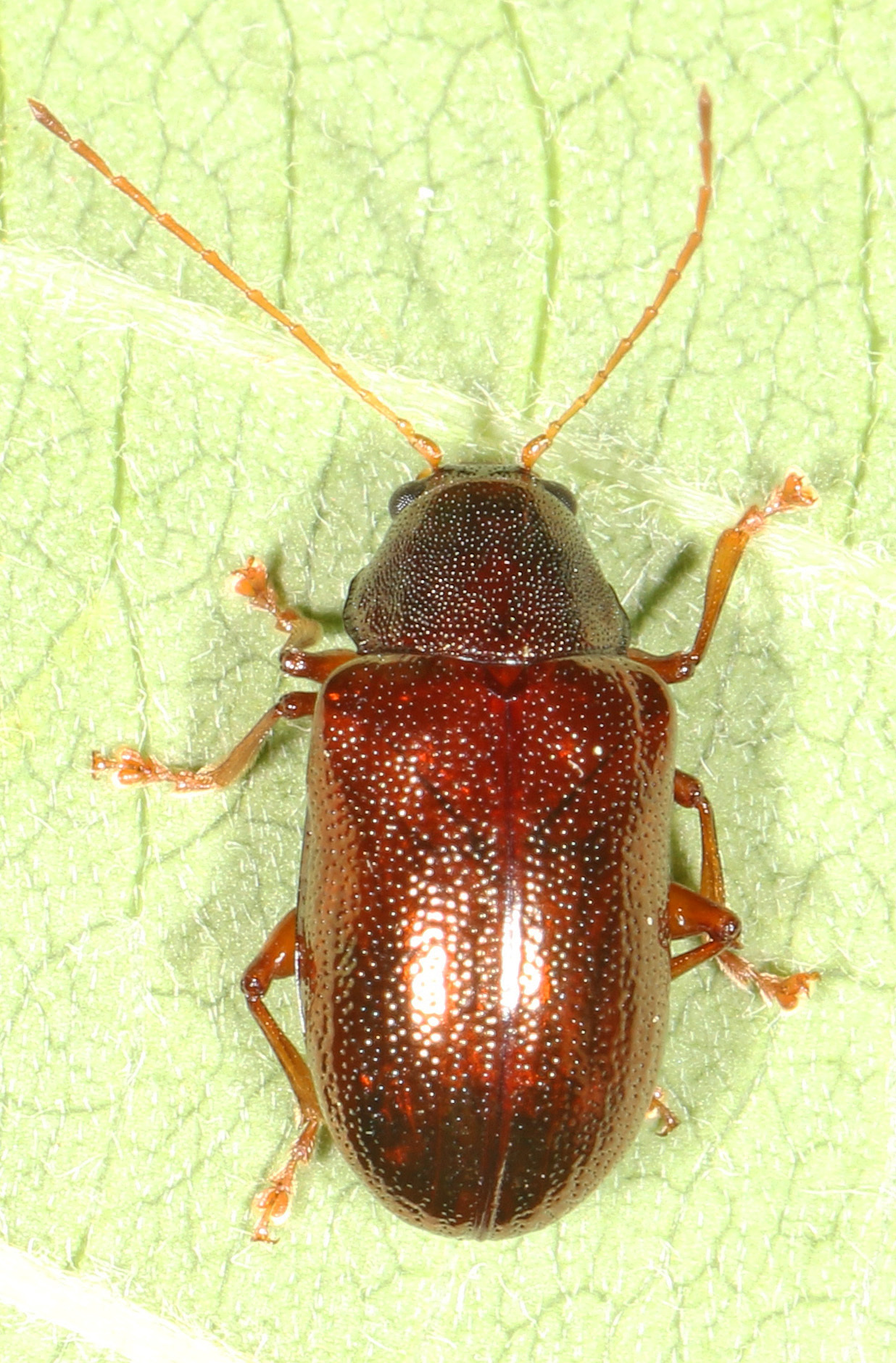

Scientific classification
- Kingdom: Animalia
- Phylum: Arthropoda
- Clade: Pancrustacea
- Class: Insecta
- Order: Coleoptera
- Suborder: Polyphaga
- Infraorder: Cucujiformia
- Family: Chrysomelidae
- Genus: Tymnes
- Species: T. tricolor

Binomial name
- Tymnes tricolor (Fabricius, 1792)

Synonyms
- Colaspis cartwrighti Blake, 1977; Chrysomela tricolor Fabricius, 1792; Tymnes verticalis Chapuis, 1874

= Tymnes tricolor =

Species of beetle

Tymnes tricolor is a species of leaf beetle. It is found in North America.
