= Glyptoscelis pubescens =

Scientific classification
- Kingdom: Animalia
- Phylum: Arthropoda
- Clade: Pancrustacea
- Class: Insecta
- Order: Coleoptera
- Suborder: Polyphaga
- Infraorder: Cucujiformia
- Family: Chrysomelidae
- Genus: Glyptoscelis
- Species: G. pubescens

Binomial name
- Glyptoscelis pubescens (Fabricius, 1777)

Synonyms
- Cryptocephalus hirsutus Gmelin, 1791; Cryptocephalus pubescens Fabricius, 1777; Eumolpus hirtus Olivier, 1808; Eumolpus pini Say, 1826

Species of beetle

Glyptoscelis pubescens, known generally as the hairy leaf beetle or pine chrysomelid, is a species of leaf beetle. It is found in eastern North America. It is a potential pest of pine trees.

Parasites of G. pubescens include the parasitoid wasps Eupelmus sp. (in Eupelmidae) and Microctonus glyptosceli (in Braconidae, subfamily Euphorinae).
