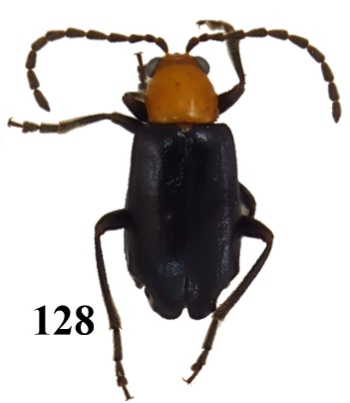

Scientific classification
- Kingdom: Animalia
- Phylum: Arthropoda
- Clade: Pancrustacea
- Class: Insecta
- Order: Coleoptera
- Suborder: Polyphaga
- Infraorder: Cucujiformia
- Family: Chrysomelidae
- Tribe: Luperini
- Subtribe: Luperina
- Genus: Androlyperus
- Species: A. incisus

Binomial name
- Androlyperus incisus Schaeffer, 1906

= Androlyperus incisus =

Species of beetle

Androlyperus incisus is a species of skeletonizing leaf beetle in the family Chrysomelidae. It is found in western North America (California and Arizona in the United States, Baja California in Mexico).

Androlyperus incisus measures 3.2–5.0 mm (0.13–0.20 in).
