= Brachypnoea texana =

Scientific classification
- Kingdom: Animalia
- Phylum: Arthropoda
- Clade: Pancrustacea
- Class: Insecta
- Order: Coleoptera
- Suborder: Polyphaga
- Infraorder: Cucujiformia
- Family: Chrysomelidae
- Genus: Brachypnoea
- Species: B. texana

Binomial name
- Brachypnoea texana (Schaeffer, 1919)

Synonyms
- Nodonota texana Schaeffer, 1919

Species of beetle

Brachypnoea texana is a species of leaf beetle. It is endemic to the Edwards Plateau in Texas. It was first described by the American entomologist Charles Frederic August Schaeffer in 1919.
