= Brachypnoea clypealis =

Scientific classification
- Kingdom: Animalia
- Phylum: Arthropoda
- Clade: Pancrustacea
- Class: Insecta
- Order: Coleoptera
- Suborder: Polyphaga
- Infraorder: Cucujiformia
- Family: Chrysomelidae
- Genus: Brachypnoea
- Species: B. clypealis

Binomial name
- Brachypnoea clypealis (Horn, 1892)

Synonyms
- Nodonota clypealis Horn, 1892

Species of beetle

Brachypnoea clypealis is a species of leaf beetle. It is found in the Eastern United States.
