= Brachypnoea convexa =

Scientific classification
- Kingdom: Animalia
- Phylum: Arthropoda
- Clade: Pancrustacea
- Class: Insecta
- Order: Coleoptera
- Suborder: Polyphaga
- Infraorder: Cucujiformia
- Family: Chrysomelidae
- Genus: Brachypnoea
- Species: B. convexa

Binomial name
- Brachypnoea convexa (Say, 1824)

Synonyms
- Colaspis convexa Say, 1824

Species of beetle

Brachypnoea convexa is a species of leaf beetle. It is found in the Eastern United States.
