= Spintherophyta festiva =

Scientific classification
- Kingdom: Animalia
- Phylum: Arthropoda
- Clade: Pancrustacea
- Class: Insecta
- Order: Coleoptera
- Suborder: Polyphaga
- Infraorder: Cucujiformia
- Family: Chrysomelidae
- Genus: Spintherophyta
- Species: S. festiva

Binomial name
- Spintherophyta festiva (Lefèvre, 1877)

Synonyms
- Chrysodina festiva Lefèvre, 1877

Species of beetle

Spintherophyta festiva is a species of leaf beetle native to Mexico.
