= Androlyperus maculatus =

Scientific classification
- Kingdom: Animalia
- Phylum: Arthropoda
- Clade: Pancrustacea
- Class: Insecta
- Order: Coleoptera
- Suborder: Polyphaga
- Infraorder: Cucujiformia
- Family: Chrysomelidae
- Genus: Androlyperus
- Species: A. maculatus

Binomial name
- Androlyperus maculatus J. L. LeConte, 1883

Species of beetle

Androlyperus maculatus is a species of skeletonizing leaf beetle in the family Chrysomelidae. It is found in western North America (California, the United States; Baja California, Mexico).

Androlyperus maculatus measure 7.1–8.8 mm (0.28–0.35 in).
