= Metachroma angusticolle =

Scientific classification
- Kingdom: Animalia
- Phylum: Arthropoda
- Clade: Pancrustacea
- Class: Insecta
- Order: Coleoptera
- Suborder: Polyphaga
- Infraorder: Cucujiformia
- Family: Chrysomelidae
- Genus: Metachroma
- Species: M. angusticolle

Binomial name
- Metachroma angusticolle Blake, 1974

Species of beetle

Metachroma angusticolle is a species of leaf beetle. It is found in Illinois and Indiana in the United States.
