= Metachroma texanum =

Scientific classification
- Kingdom: Animalia
- Phylum: Arthropoda
- Clade: Pancrustacea
- Class: Insecta
- Order: Coleoptera
- Suborder: Polyphaga
- Infraorder: Cucujiformia
- Family: Chrysomelidae
- Genus: Metachroma
- Species: M. texanum

Binomial name
- Metachroma texanum Schaeffer, 1919

Species of beetle

Metachroma texanum is a species of leaf beetle. It is found in coastal states of the southeastern United States, ranging from Texas to Florida. Its length is between 3.5 and 4.0 mm. It was first described by the American entomologist Charles Frederic August Schaeffer in 1919.
