= Tymnes chrysis =

Scientific classification
- Kingdom: Animalia
- Phylum: Arthropoda
- Clade: Pancrustacea
- Class: Insecta
- Order: Coleoptera
- Suborder: Polyphaga
- Infraorder: Cucujiformia
- Family: Chrysomelidae
- Genus: Tymnes
- Species: T. chrysis

Binomial name
- Tymnes chrysis (Olivier, 1808)

Synonyms
- Colaspis chrysis Olivier, 1808

Species of beetle

Tymnes chrysis is a species of leaf beetle. It is found in North America. The species has been recorded from plants of the genus Robinia (commonly known as "locusts") or similar genera in the family Fabaceae.
