= Metachroma interruptum =

Scientific classification
- Kingdom: Animalia
- Phylum: Arthropoda
- Clade: Pancrustacea
- Class: Insecta
- Order: Coleoptera
- Suborder: Polyphaga
- Infraorder: Cucujiformia
- Family: Chrysomelidae
- Genus: Metachroma
- Species: M. interruptum

Binomial name
- Metachroma interruptum (Say, 1824)

Synonyms
- Colaspis interrupta Say, 1824

Species of beetle

Metachroma interruptum is a species of leaf beetle. It is found in the United States, where its range spans from Texas to Florida and Indiana to Utah. Its length is between 4.4 and 6.0 mm.
