= Brachypnoea margaretae =

Scientific classification
- Kingdom: Animalia
- Phylum: Arthropoda
- Clade: Pancrustacea
- Class: Insecta
- Order: Coleoptera
- Suborder: Polyphaga
- Infraorder: Cucujiformia
- Family: Chrysomelidae
- Genus: Brachypnoea
- Species: B. margaretae

Binomial name
- Brachypnoea margaretae (Schultz, 1980)

Synonyms
- Nodonota margaretae Schultz, 1980

Species of beetle

Brachypnoea margaretae is a species of leaf beetle. It is distributed across the northeastern United States and southeastern Canada, from Massachusetts to North Dakota and Ontario to Manitoba.

The species was first described by William T. Schultz, who named it after his wife, Margaret.
