= William Duppa Crotch =

Naturalist and entomologist (1832–1903)

- Born: 4 August 1832; Taunton
- Died: 25 August 1903 (aged 71); Richmond, Surrey
- Occupations: Naturalist; Entomologist

William Duppa Crotch FLS (1832–1903) was a British naturalist, specialising in Norwegian wildlife and in entomology, particularly Lepidoptera, Hemiptera and Coleoptera.

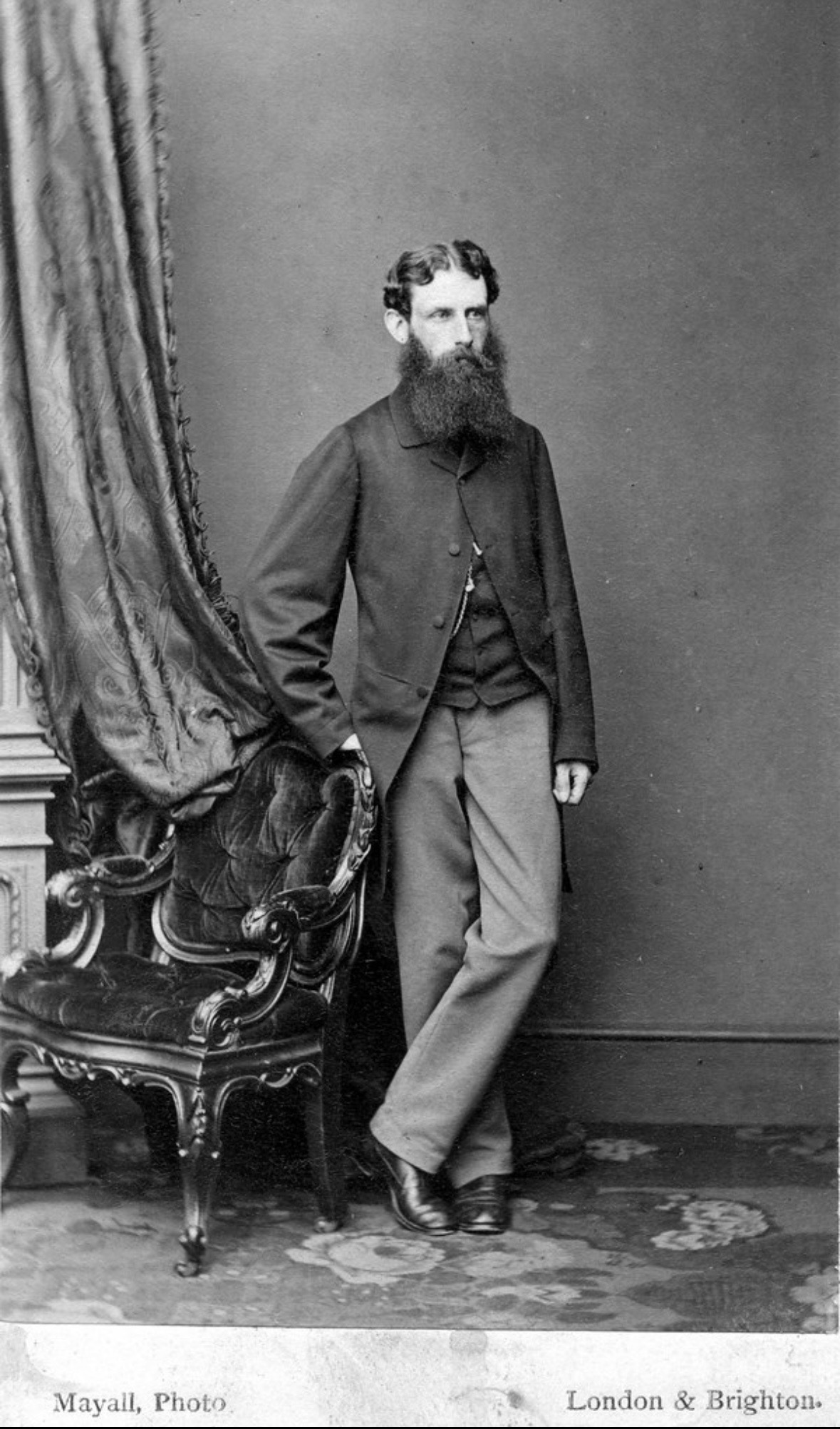
William Duppa Crotch

== Personal life ==
Crotch was born at Taunton, Somerset on 31 July 1832 and baptised on 23 August 1832. Crotch's parents were Reverend William Robert Crotch (1799–1877) and Elizabeth (née Duppa, 1800–1848) of Bridgnorth, who had married on 21 July 1831. Crotch's father William Robert Crotch worked as a schoolmaster and hospital chaplain and he collected botanical specimens, which may have encouraged his children's interest in natural history. Crotch's paternal grandfather was the musician William Crotch (1775–1847).

Crotch had a younger brother named George Robert Crotch (1842-1874) who was a respected Coleopterist. He died young of pulmonary disease, possibly exacerbated by working in Philadelphia during a harsh winter.

Crotch's mother Elizabeth died in 1848 and his father Reverend Crotch went on to marry twice more.

William Duppa Crotch married Mari Blackwell, widow of his friend Eardley Blackwell, on 5 October 1868. Mari was originally from Norway, and was the daughter of Thor Svee of Vaage (now spelled Vågå). Crotch became stepfather to Mari's two daughters Elizabeth and Kari. Crotch divided his time between living in Norway and England.

== Career ==
Crotch graduated B.A. from Oxford on 30 May 1855, and progressed to an M.A. in 1866. Crotch attempted to study for the medical profession, but did not qualify.

In 1859, Crotch studied Shetland ponies and their diets and circa January 1860, Crotch visited Berlin to study Hemiptera.

Between about 1861 to 1865, Crotch visited the Canary Islands twice with his brother George and collected more than 40,000 natural history specimens, mainly Coleoptera, for which they recorded 77 species occurring in the Canaries for the first time.

Crotch was an occasional correspondent with Charles Darwin, and in one letter to Darwin dated 10 April 1865, he indicated his support for a "theory of Atlantis" that America and Africa had once been joined by a land bridge which might account for the geographical distribution of species, compared with a competing Behring Strait land bridge theory that had been advanced by Asa Gray.

=== Lemmings ===
Crotch spent ten summers observing the habits of lemmings near his Norwegian home (its location was described by Crotch as in the Vaage Valley by a path to Heindaken), admitting he could barely escape them:

During ten consecutive summers spent in Norway I have three times lived literally in the midst of the lemmings, and have even, though involuntarily, shared my bed with them; thus I am enabled to speak positively, so far, at least, as my observation extends.

— Crotch

Once again influenced by the idea of a lost Atlantean continent, Crotch suggested the theory that Lemmings were not careless of their lives by drowning themselves while migrating, but were instead still trying to migrate across the now submerged areas that their ancestors had known as dry land.

== Death ==
Crotch died at his house "Asgard," at Richmond, Surrey on 25 August 1903.
