= Brachypnoea rotundicollis =

Scientific classification
- Kingdom: Animalia
- Phylum: Arthropoda
- Clade: Pancrustacea
- Class: Insecta
- Order: Coleoptera
- Suborder: Polyphaga
- Infraorder: Cucujiformia
- Family: Chrysomelidae
- Genus: Brachypnoea
- Species: B. rotundicollis

Binomial name
- Brachypnoea rotundicollis (Schaeffer, 1906)

Synonyms
- Nodonota rotundicollis Schaeffer, 1906

Species of beetle

Brachypnoea rotundicollis is a species of leaf beetle. It is found in southeastern Texas. It was first described by the American entomologist Charles Frederic August Schaeffer in 1906.
