= Malthinus difficilis =

Scientific classification
- Domain: Eukaryota
- Kingdom: Animalia
- Phylum: Arthropoda
- Class: Insecta
- Order: Coleoptera
- Suborder: Polyphaga
- Infraorder: Elateriformia
- Family: Cantharidae
- Genus: Malthinus
- Species: M. difficilis

Binomial name
- Malthinus difficilis LeConte, 1851

Species of beetle

Malthinus difficilis is a species of soldier beetle in the family Cantharidae. It is found in North America.
