= Metachroma ustum =

Scientific classification
- Kingdom: Animalia
- Phylum: Arthropoda
- Clade: Pancrustacea
- Class: Insecta
- Order: Coleoptera
- Suborder: Polyphaga
- Infraorder: Cucujiformia
- Family: Chrysomelidae
- Genus: Metachroma
- Species: M. ustum

Binomial name
- Metachroma ustum LeConte, 1858

Species of beetle

Metachroma ustum is a species of leaf beetle. It is found in Central America and North America. Its length is between 4.8 and 7.0 mm.
