= Malthinus texanus =

Scientific classification
- Domain: Eukaryota
- Kingdom: Animalia
- Phylum: Arthropoda
- Class: Insecta
- Order: Coleoptera
- Suborder: Polyphaga
- Infraorder: Elateriformia
- Family: Cantharidae
- Genus: Malthinus
- Species: M. texanus

Binomial name
- Malthinus texanus Wittmer, 1981

Species of beetle

Malthinus texanus is a species of soldier beetle in the family Cantharidae. It is found in North America.
