= Glyptoscelis albida =

Scientific classification
- Kingdom: Animalia
- Phylum: Arthropoda
- Clade: Pancrustacea
- Class: Insecta
- Order: Coleoptera
- Suborder: Polyphaga
- Infraorder: Cucujiformia
- Family: Chrysomelidae
- Genus: Glyptoscelis
- Species: G. albida

Binomial name
- Glyptoscelis albida LeConte, 1859

Species of beetle

Glyptoscelis albida is a species of leaf beetle. It is found in western North America.
