= Spintherophyta violaceipennis =

Scientific classification
- Kingdom: Animalia
- Phylum: Arthropoda
- Clade: Pancrustacea
- Class: Insecta
- Order: Coleoptera
- Suborder: Polyphaga
- Infraorder: Cucujiformia
- Family: Chrysomelidae
- Genus: Spintherophyta
- Species: S. violaceipennis

Binomial name
- Spintherophyta violaceipennis (Horn, 1892)

Synonyms
- Colaspoides violaceipennis Horn, 1892

Species of beetle

Spintherophyta violaceipennis is a species of leaf beetle native to North America. Its range spans from southern Arizona and California south to Mexico. The species can be identified by the color of the pronotum and elytra: the pronotum is shiny and has a dark blue color, while the elytra are dark coppery red to a deep purple. The species is reported to feed on oak, willow, juniper and pine. The specific name, violaceipennis, is derived from the Latin for "violet wings".
