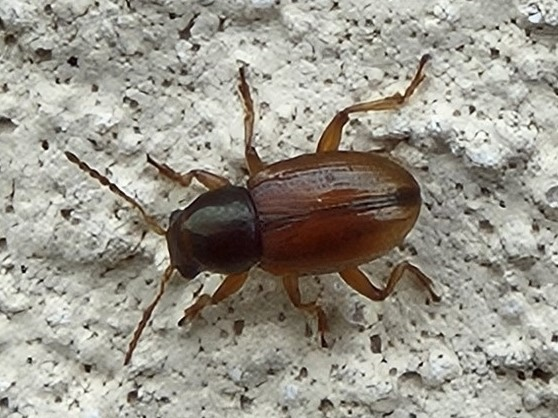

Scientific classification
- Kingdom: Animalia
- Phylum: Arthropoda
- Clade: Pancrustacea
- Class: Insecta
- Order: Coleoptera
- Suborder: Polyphaga
- Infraorder: Cucujiformia
- Family: Chrysomelidae
- Genus: Metachroma
- Species: M. longicolle

Binomial name
- Metachroma longicolle Jacoby, 1891

= Metachroma longicolle =

Species of beetle

Metachroma longicolle is a species of leaf beetle. It is found in the United States and Mexico. Its length is between 2.4 and 3.4 mm.

== Subspecies ==
There are two subspecies of M. longicolle:

- Metachroma longicolle aeneicolle Horn, 1892
- Metachroma longicolle longicolle Jacoby, 1891
