= Brachypnoea tristis =

Scientific classification
- Kingdom: Animalia
- Phylum: Arthropoda
- Clade: Pancrustacea
- Class: Insecta
- Order: Coleoptera
- Suborder: Polyphaga
- Infraorder: Cucujiformia
- Family: Chrysomelidae
- Genus: Brachypnoea
- Species: B. tristis

Binomial name
- Brachypnoea tristis (Olivier, 1808)

Synonyms
- Colaspis ovata Say, 1824; Colaspis pilula Germar, 1824; Colaspis tristis Olivier, 1808

Species of beetle

Brachypnoea tristis is a species of leaf beetle. It is found in the Eastern United States.
