= Promecosoma inflatum =

Scientific classification
- Kingdom: Animalia
- Phylum: Arthropoda
- Clade: Pancrustacea
- Class: Insecta
- Order: Coleoptera
- Suborder: Polyphaga
- Infraorder: Cucujiformia
- Family: Chrysomelidae
- Genus: Promecosoma
- Species: P. inflatum

Binomial name
- Promecosoma inflatum Lefèvre, 1877

Species of beetle

Promecosoma inflatum is a species of leaf beetle. It is found in Mexico, as well as in Arizona in the United States.
