= Glyptoscelis prosopis =

Scientific classification
- Kingdom: Animalia
- Phylum: Arthropoda
- Clade: Pancrustacea
- Class: Insecta
- Order: Coleoptera
- Suborder: Polyphaga
- Infraorder: Cucujiformia
- Family: Chrysomelidae
- Genus: Glyptoscelis
- Species: G. prosopis

Binomial name
- Glyptoscelis prosopis Schaeffer, 1905

Species of beetle

Glyptoscelis prosopis is a species of leaf beetle. Its range spans from southern Texas to Mexico and Central America. It was first described by the American entomologist Charles Frederic August Schaeffer in 1905.
