= Metaparia opacicollis =

Scientific classification
- Kingdom: Animalia
- Phylum: Arthropoda
- Clade: Pancrustacea
- Class: Insecta
- Order: Coleoptera
- Suborder: Polyphaga
- Infraorder: Cucujiformia
- Family: Chrysomelidae
- Genus: Metaparia
- Species: M. opacicollis

Binomial name
- Metaparia opacicollis (Horn, 1892)

Synonyms
- Colaspoides opacicollis Horn, 1892

Species of beetle

Metaparia opacicollis is a species of leaf beetle. It is found in New Mexico and Texas.
