= Chrysodinopsis =

Scientific classification
- Kingdom: Animalia
- Phylum: Arthropoda
- Clade: Pancrustacea
- Class: Insecta
- Order: Coleoptera
- Suborder: Polyphaga
- Infraorder: Cucujiformia
- Family: Chrysomelidae
- Subfamily: Eumolpinae
- Tribe: Eumolpini
- Genus: Chrysodinopsis; Bechyné, 1950

Type species
- Noda curtula Jacoby, 1881

Genus of leaf beetles

Chrysodinopsis is a genus of leaf beetles in the subfamily Eumolpinae. It was first described by the Czech entomologist Jan Bechyné in 1950. There are three described species in Chrysodinopsis. The genus is possibly synonymous with Brachypnoea.

== Species ==
- Chrysodinopsis basalis (Jacoby, 1890) (Synonyms: Nodonota arizonica Schaeffer, 1906; Nodonota parkeri B. White, 1941) – Mexico, southern Arizona
- Chrysodinopsis cupriceps (Lefèvre, 1877) – El Salvador, Guatemala, Honduras, Mexico, Nicaragua
- Chrysodinopsis curtula (Jacoby, 1881) – Mexico
