= Glyptoscelis cryptica =

Scientific classification
- Kingdom: Animalia
- Phylum: Arthropoda
- Clade: Pancrustacea
- Class: Insecta
- Order: Coleoptera
- Suborder: Polyphaga
- Infraorder: Cucujiformia
- Family: Chrysomelidae
- Genus: Glyptoscelis
- Species: G. cryptica

Binomial name
- Glyptoscelis cryptica (Say, 1824)

Synonyms
- Eumolpus crypticus Say, 1824

Species of beetle

Glyptoscelis cryptica is a species of leaf beetle. It is found in the central United States.
