= Glyptoscelis albicans =

Scientific classification
- Kingdom: Animalia
- Phylum: Arthropoda
- Clade: Pancrustacea
- Class: Insecta
- Order: Coleoptera
- Suborder: Polyphaga
- Infraorder: Cucujiformia
- Family: Chrysomelidae
- Genus: Glyptoscelis
- Species: G. albicans

Binomial name
- Glyptoscelis albicans Baly, 1865

Synonyms
- Glyptoscelis liebecki Blatchley, 1910

Species of beetle

Glyptoscelis albicans is a species of leaf beetle. It is found in the southeastern United States.
