= Glyptoscelis juniperi =

Scientific classification
- Kingdom: Animalia
- Phylum: Arthropoda
- Clade: Pancrustacea
- Class: Insecta
- Order: Coleoptera
- Suborder: Polyphaga
- Infraorder: Cucujiformia
- Family: Chrysomelidae
- Genus: Glyptoscelis
- Species: G. juniperi

Binomial name
- Glyptoscelis juniperi Blake, 1967

Species of beetle

Glyptoscelis juniperi is a species of leaf beetle. It is found in California in the United States.

== Subspecies ==
These two subspecies belong to the species Glyptoscelis juniperi:

- Glyptoscelis juniperi juniperi Blake, 1967^{i c g}
- Glyptoscelis juniperi zanthocoma Blake, 1967^{i c g}

Data sources: i = ITIS, c = Catalogue of Life, g = GBIF, b = Bugguide.net
