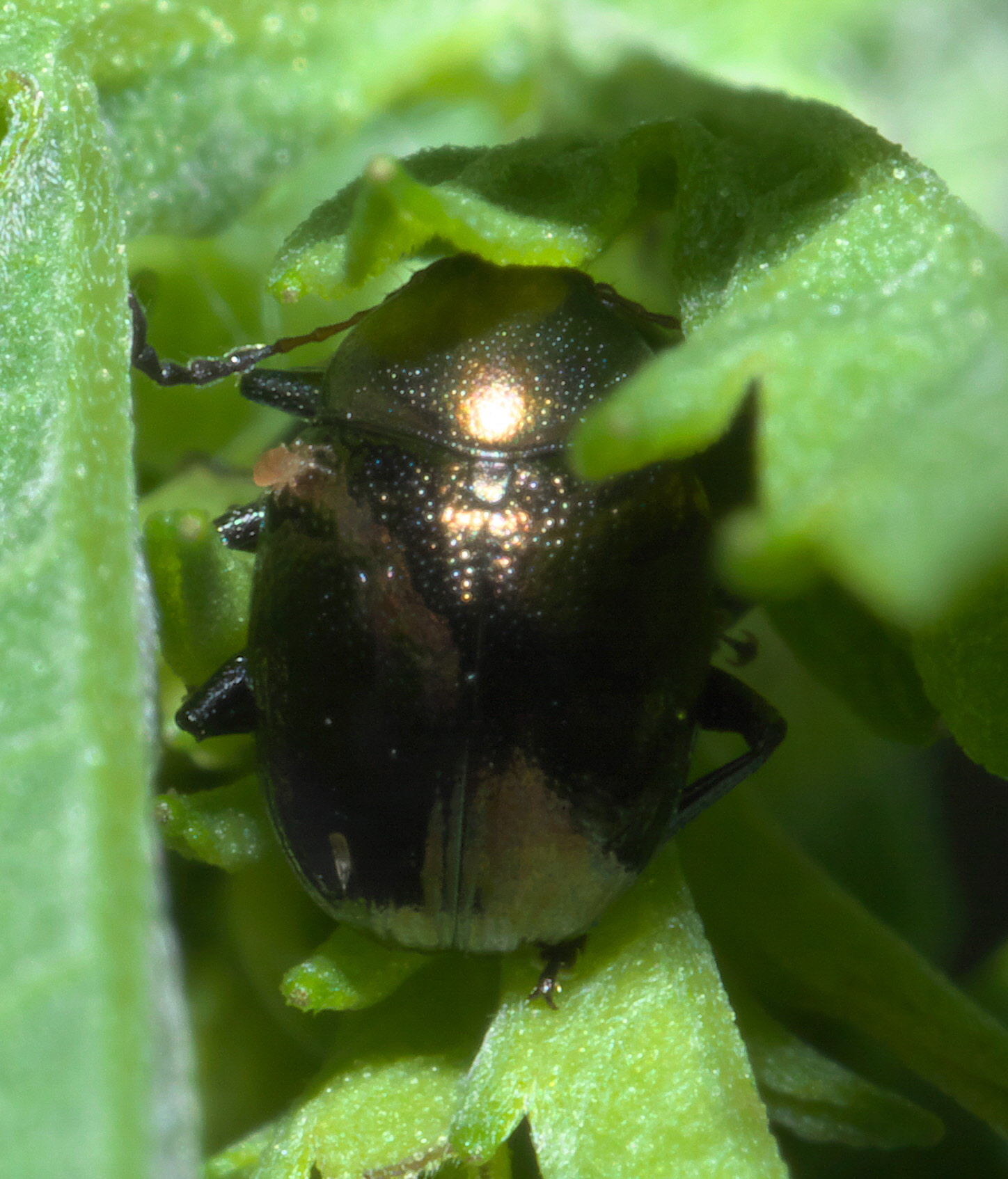
- Brachypnoea

Scientific classification
- Kingdom: Animalia
- Phylum: Arthropoda
- Clade: Pancrustacea
- Class: Insecta
- Order: Coleoptera
- Suborder: Polyphaga
- Infraorder: Cucujiformia
- Family: Chrysomelidae
- Subfamily: Eumolpinae
- Tribe: Eumolpini
- Genus: Brachypnoea; Gistel, 1848

Type species
- Colaspis tristis Olivier, 1808

Synonyms
- Noda Chevrolat in Dejean, 1836 (nec Schellenberg, 1803); Nodonota Lefèvre, 1885; Colaspomorpha Weise, 1921

= Brachypnoea =

Genus of beetles

Brachypnoea is a genus of leaf beetles in the subfamily Eumolpinae. It is mostly found in the Neotropical realm, though there are also eight known species in the Nearctic realm.

The genus was originally named Noda, named by Chevrolat in Dejean's Catalogue in 1836. However, this was preoccupied by Noda Schellenberg, 1803, a genus in Diptera. Two replacement names were made for Noda: Brachypnoea, by Gistel in 1848, and Nodonota by Édouard Lefèvre in 1885. Since Brachypnoea was published first, it has priority over Nodonota.

== Species ==
These species belong to the genus Brachypnoea:

- Brachypnoea acuminata (Lefèvre, 1885) – Colombia
- Brachypnoea acutangula (Jacoby, 1890) – Mexico
- Brachypnoea angulicollis (Lefèvre, 1876) – Peru, Bolivia, Brazil, Argentina
- Brachypnoea arbustorum Bechyné & Bechyné, 1961 – Brazil
- Brachypnoea argentinensis (Jacoby, 1904) – Argentina
- Brachypnoea atra (Harold, 1875)
  - Brachypnoea atra adequata (Bechyné, 1955) – Panama, Costa Rica, Nicaragua, Guatemala
  - Brachypnoea atra atra (Harold, 1875) – Venezuela, Colombia
  - Brachypnoea atra dislocata (Bechyné, 1953) – Venezuela
  - Brachypnoea atra mosqueya Bechyné, 1997 – Venezuela
- Brachypnoea aurulenta (Lefèvre, 1876) – Peru, Bolivia, Venezuela
- Brachypnoea balyi (Jacoby, 1878) – Guatemala, Mexico, Costa Rica
- Brachypnoea bebedera (Bechyné, 1955) – Costa Rica
- Brachypnoea bella (Jacoby, 1890) – Mexico
- Brachypnoea bicallosa (Jacoby, 1881) – Guatemala
- Brachypnoea boggianii (Jacoby, 1899)
  - Brachypnoea boggianii boggianii (Jacoby, 1899) – Paraguay, Argentina, Bolivia
  - Brachypnoea boggianii laplatensis (Bechyné, 1954) – Argentina, Uruguay
- Brachypnoea bogotana (Harold, 1874) – Colombia
- Brachypnoea boliviana (Jacoby, 1899) – Bolivia
- Brachypnoea bowditchi (Bechyné, 1949) – Argentina, Bolivia
- Brachypnoea callosa (Lefèvre, 1878) – Colombia
- Brachypnoea carpintera (Bechyné, 1955) – Costa Rica
- Brachypnoea chalcea (Lefèvre, 1878) – Colombia
- Brachypnoea chontalensis (Jacoby, 1890) – Nicaragua
- Brachypnoea clypealis (Horn, 1892) – Canada, United States
- Brachypnoea colaspisformis (Bechyné, 1949) – Argentina
- Brachypnoea colonensis (Bechyné, 1955) – Panama
- Brachypnoea columbina (Lefèvre, 1878) – Colombia
- Brachypnoea congregata (Jacoby, 1890) – Mexico
- Brachypnoea consonaria (Bechyné, 1951) – Bolivia
- Brachypnoea convexa (Say, 1824) – United States
- Brachypnoea coroicensis (Bechyné, 1951) – Bolivia, Peru
- Brachypnoea costipennis (Lefèvre, 1875) – Brazil, Mexico (?)
- Brachypnoea cretifera (Lefèvre, 1875) – Mexico, Belize, Guatemala
- Brachypnoea cribellata (Jacoby, 1881) – Mexico
- Brachypnoea cyanella (Jacoby, 1890) – Mexico
- Brachypnoea cyanescens (Weise, 1921) – Brazil
- Brachypnoea denticollis (Jacoby, 1899) – Paraguay, Argentina
- Brachypnoea dispersa (Jacoby, 1881) – Mexico
- Brachypnoea distincta (Jacoby, 1881) – Mexico
- Brachypnoea doryphthalma (Bechyné, 1954)
  - Brachypnoea doryphthalma doryphthalma (Bechyné, 1954) – Bolivia
  - Brachypnoea doryphthalma quimensis Bechyné, 1958 – Bolivia
- Brachypnoea edura (Weise, 1921) – Brazil
- Brachypnoea elongata (Jacoby, 1890) – Mexico
- Brachypnoea eulina Bechyné & Bechyné, 1961 – Brazil
- Brachypnoea exilis (Erichson, 1848)
  - Brachypnoea exilis debilis Bechyné, 1997 – Venezuela
  - Brachypnoea exilis exilis (Erichson, 1848) – Venezuela, Guyana, Suriname, French Guiana, Trinidad
  - Brachypnoea exilis grita (Bechyné, 1955) – Venezuela
  - Brachypnoea exilis propinqua (Lefèvre, 1875) – Colombia
  - Brachypnoea exilis tuberculata (Lefèvre, 1875) – Venezuela
- Brachypnoea fallaciosa (Weise, 1921) – Brazil
- Brachypnoea fastidita (Jacoby, 1899) – Peru
- Brachypnoea filicornis (Weise, 1921) – Brazil
- Brachypnoea floricola (Bechyné, 1949) – Brazil
- Brachypnoea freyi (Bechyné, 1951) – Bolivia
- Brachypnoea grenadensis (Jacoby, 1897) – Saint Vincent, Grenada
- Brachypnoea hondurensis (Jacoby, 1890) – Belize
- Brachypnoea humeralis (Latreille, 1833) – Venezuela
- Brachypnoea humilis (Erichson, 1848) – Guyana
- Brachypnoea igneicollis (Jacoby, 1881) – Mexico
- Brachypnoea imitans (Jacoby, 1890) – Mexico
- Brachypnoea insignis (Lefèvre, 1885) – Colombia
- Brachypnoea interrupta (Weise, 1921) – Brazil
- Brachypnoea irazuensis (Jacoby, 1881) – Costa Rica
- Brachypnoea junonis (Bechyné, 1952) – Brazil, Paraguay, Bolivia
- Brachypnoea laeta (Lefèvre, 1878) – Colombia
- Brachypnoea landolti (Lefèvre, 1878) – Colombia, Venezuela
- Brachypnoea lateralis (Jacoby, 1881)
  - Brachypnoea lateralis jaliscensis (Bechyné, 1953) – Mexico
  - Brachypnoea lateralis lateralis (Jacoby, 1881) – Mexico, Guatemala
- Brachypnoea lecontei E. Riley, S. Clark & Seeno, 2003 – United States
- Brachypnoea lefevrei (Jacoby, 1878)
  - Brachypnoea lefevrei boucardi (Jacoby, 1878) – Guatemala
  - Brachypnoea lefevrei lefevrei (Jacoby, 1878) – Mexico, Belize, Guatemala, Nicaragua, Costa Rica
- Brachypnoea longicornis (Bechyné, 1953) – Trinidad
- Brachypnoea lugens (Weise, 1921) – Brazil
- Brachypnoea luteipes (Lefèvre, 1878) – Colombia
- Brachypnoea margaretae (Schultz, 1980) – Canada, United States
- Brachypnoea medellina (Lefèvre, 1878) – Colombia
- Brachypnoea meligethoides (Weise, 1921) – Brazil
- Brachypnoea meridensis (Bechyné, 1953) – Venezuela
- Brachypnoea metallica (Jacoby, 1890) – Mexico
- Brachypnoea micromela (Bechyné, 1953) – Venezuela
- Brachypnoea mimas (Bechyné, 1955) – Panama
- Brachypnoea miribella (Bechyné, 1951) – Bolivia
- Brachypnoea mixiollensis (Bechyné, 1954) – Peru
- Brachypnoea modesta (Lefèvre, 1878)
  - Brachypnoea modesta animatoria (Bechyné, 1953) – Costa Rica, Guatemala
  - Brachypnoea modesta modesta (Lefèvre, 1878) – Colombia
  - Brachypnoea modesta parvula (Jacoby, 1890) – Panama
- Brachypnoea moerens (Weise, 1921) – Brazil
- Brachypnoea moesta (Weise, 1921) – Brazil
- Brachypnoea nana (Klug, 1829) – Brazil, Argentina, Paraguay
- Brachypnoea nicandra (Bechyné, 1953) – Brazil
- Brachypnoea nigra (Weise, 1921) – Brazil
- Brachypnoea obliterata (Jacoby, 1890) – Mexico
- Brachypnoea ocanana (Lefèvre, 1878) – Colombia
- Brachypnoea opaca (Jacoby, 1881) – Mexico
- Brachypnoea opacicollis (Jacoby, 1890) – Mexico
- Brachypnoea ovoidea (Bechyné, 1953) – Panama
- Brachypnoea palmarensis (Bechyné, 1951) – Bolivia
- Brachypnoea paraensis Bechyné & Bechyne, 1961 – Brazil
- Brachypnoea peregrina (Lefèvre, 1878) – Colombia
- Brachypnoea phryna (Bechyné, 1953) – Argentina
- Brachypnoea piccolina Bechyné & Bechyné, 1964 – Brazil
- Brachypnoea placida (Jacoby, 1890) – Mexico, Panama
- Brachypnoea plumbea (Jacoby, 1890) – Mexico
- Brachypnoea puncticollis (Say, 1824) (rose leaf beetle) – Canada, United States
- Brachypnoea pustulata (Harold, 1874)
  - Brachypnoea pustulata pustulata (Harold, 1874) – Colombia
  - Brachypnoea pustulata varicolor (Bechyné, 1951) – Venezuela
- Brachypnoea rotundicollis (Schaeffer, 1906) – United States (Texas)
- Brachypnoea ruficornis (Lefèvre, 1885) – Brazil
- Brachypnoea rufipes (Lefèvre, 1878) – Colombia
- Brachypnoea rufula (Weise, 1921) – Brazil
- Brachypnoea scheerpeltzi (Bechyné, 1955) – Costa Rica
- Brachypnoea scutellaris (Lefèvre, 1878) – Colombia
- Brachypnoea secundaria (Bechyné, 1951)
  - Brachypnoea secundaria secundaria (Bechyné, 1951) – Brazil
  - Brachypnoea secundaria sculptithorax (Bechyné, 1953) – Argentina
- Brachypnoea selenaria (Bechyné, 1951) – Bolivia
- Brachypnoea semicostata (Lefèvre, 1875) – Colombia
- Brachypnoea seminigra (Lefèvre, 1891) – Peru
- Brachypnoea sermyla (Bechyné, 1955) – Costa Rica
- Brachypnoea sinuata (Jacoby, 1890) – Mexico
- Brachypnoea sophia Bechyné & Bechyné, 1964 – Brazil
- Brachypnoea spinulosa (Lefèvre, 1885) – Brazil
- Brachypnoea strangulata (Bechyné, 1951) – Brazil
- Brachypnoea subaenea (Jacoby, 1899) – Colombia
- Brachypnoea subcylindrica (Jacoby, 1881) – Mexico
- Brachypnoea sylvana (Bechyné, 1953) – Brazil
- Brachypnoea tarsata (Jacoby, 1881) – Mexico
- Brachypnoea texana (Schaeffer, 1919) – United States (Texas)
- Brachypnoea tricostulata (Lefèvre, 1875) – Colombia, Venezuela, Guyana
- Brachypnoea tristis (Olivier, 1808) – Canada, United States
- Brachypnoea unicostata (Jacoby, 1881) – Brazil
- Brachypnoea varicornis (Weise, 1921) – Brazil
- Brachypnoea venustula (Lefèvre, 1878) – Brazil
- Brachypnoea violaceipennis (Jacoby, 1878) – Guatemala, Mexico
- Brachypnoea virginia (Bechyné, 1955) – Mexico
- Brachypnoea virgulata (Lefèvre, 1878) – Colombia
- Brachypnoea viridis (Jacoby, 1878) – Mexico, Guatemala, Costa Rica
- Brachypnoea vulnerata Bechyné & Bechyne, 1961 – Brazil
- Brachypnoea wanda (Bechyné, 1954) – Brazil
- Brachypnoea weyrauchi (Bechyné, 1955) – Peru
- Brachypnoea winkerli (Lefèvre, 1878) – Colombia
- Brachypnoea wygodzinskyi (Bechyné, 1949) – Argentina
- Brachypnoea zita (Bechyné, 1954) – Brazil

Species transferred to Dryadomolpus:

- Brachypnoea brevis (Lefèvre, 1889) (originally in Alethaxius)
- Brachypnoea ella (Bechyné, 1955)
- Brachypnoea simoni (Lefèvre, 1889)
- Brachypnoea singularis (Lefèvre, 1889)
- Brachypnoea trichophora (Bechyné, 1955)

Species transferred to other genera:

- Brachypnoea cupriceps (Lefèvre, 1877): transferred to Chrysodinopsis
- Brachypnoea minuta (Jacoby, 1881): transferred to Spintherophyta
- Brachypnoea theobromae (Bryant, 1924): transferred to Taimbezinhia

Synonyms:

- Brachypnoea chrysicollis (Weise, 1921): Synonym of Brachypnoea aurulenta (Lefèvre, 1876)
- Brachypnoea coeruleata (Jacoby, 1899): Synonym of Brachypnoea venustula (Lefèvre, 1878)
- Brachypnoea granosa (Lefèvre, 1885): Synonym of Brachypnoea nana (Klug, 1829)
- Brachypnoea purpureosericea (Bechyné, 1951): Synonym of Brachypnoea aurulenta (Lefèvre, 1876)
- Brachypnoea venezuelensis (Jacoby, 1899): Synonym of Brachypnoea humeralis (Latreille, 1833)

== Gallery ==
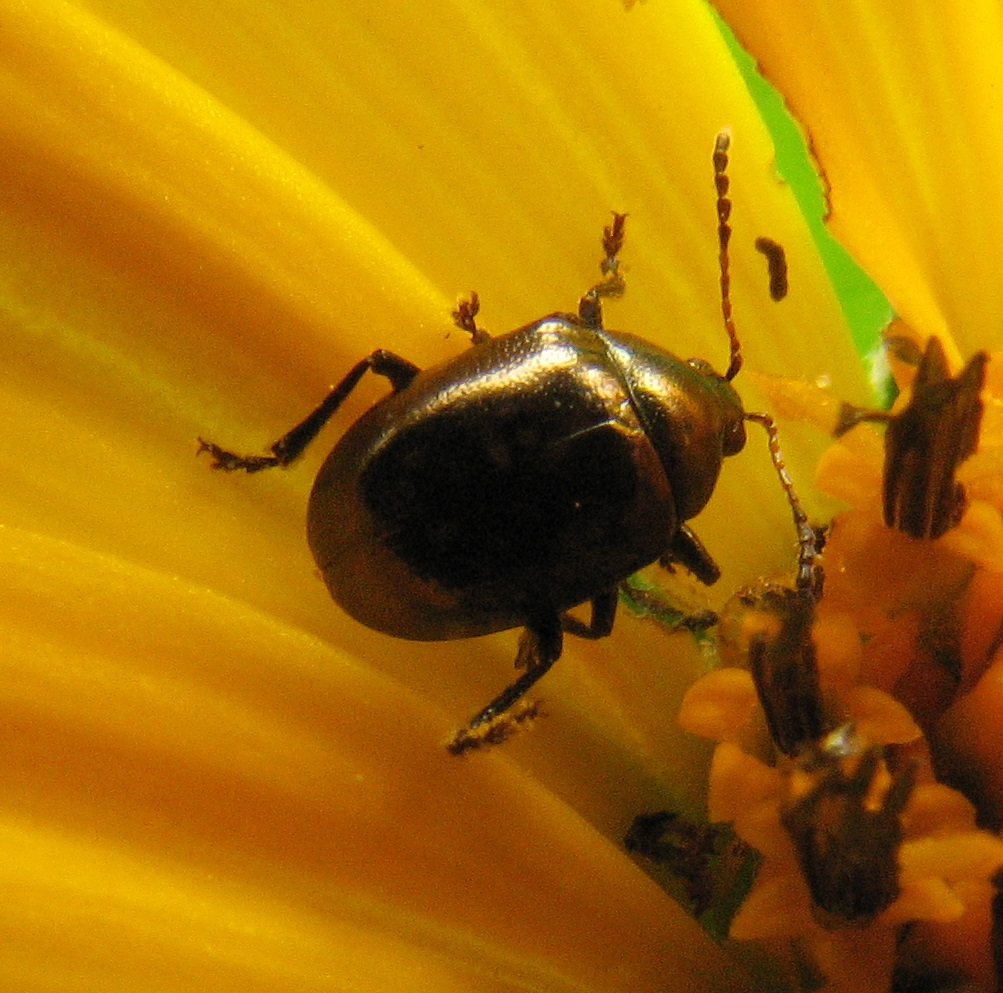
Brachypnoea sp. on sunflower
