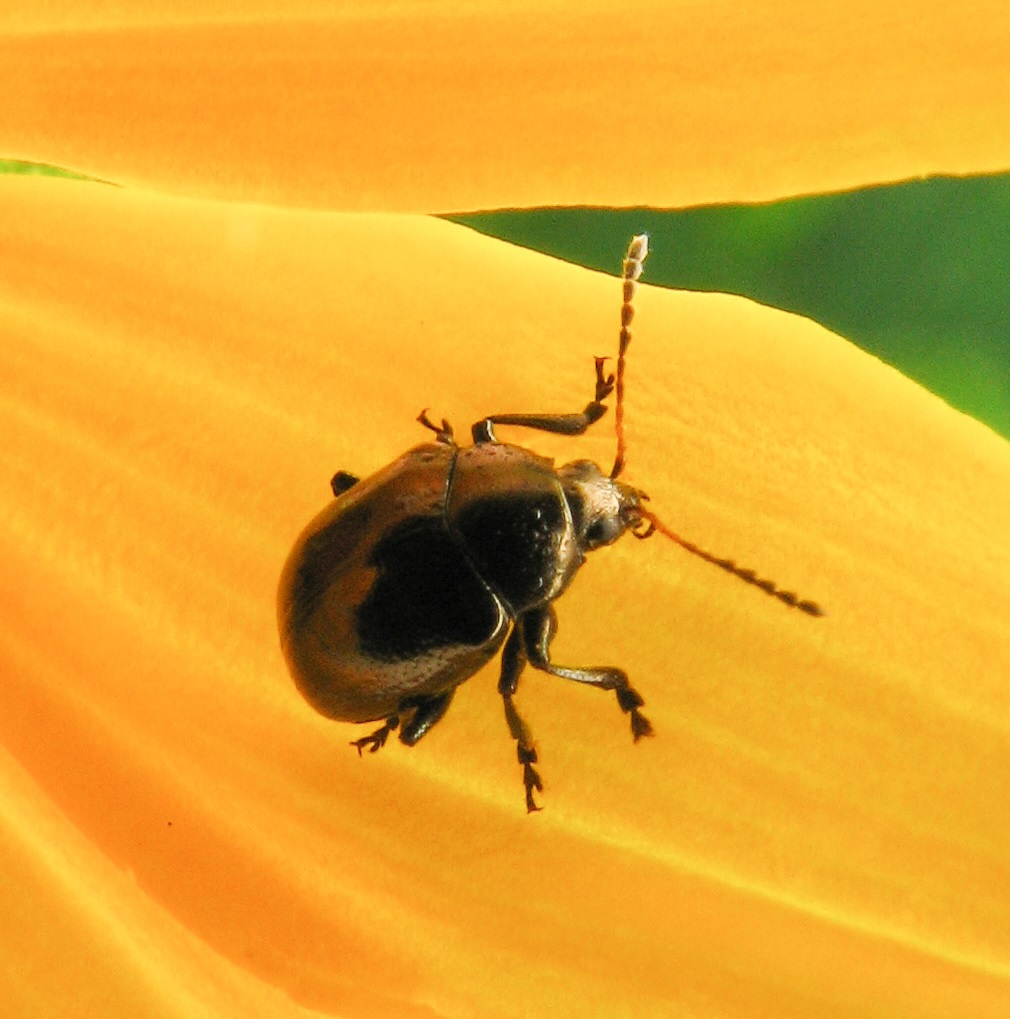

Scientific classification
- Kingdom: Animalia
- Phylum: Arthropoda
- Clade: Pancrustacea
- Class: Insecta
- Order: Coleoptera
- Suborder: Polyphaga
- Infraorder: Cucujiformia
- Family: Chrysomelidae
- Genus: Brachypnoea
- Species: B. puncticollis

Binomial name
- Brachypnoea puncticollis (Say, 1824)

Synonyms
- Colaspis puncticollis Say, 1824; Gastrophysa aenea F. E. Melsheimer, 1847; Noda strigicollis Lefèvre, 1875

= Brachypnoea puncticollis =

Species of beetle

Brachypnoea puncticollis, the rose leaf beetle, is a species of leaf beetle. It is distributed from the Eastern United States to the Rocky Mountains.
