= Nycterodina =

Scientific classification
- Kingdom: Animalia
- Phylum: Arthropoda
- Clade: Pancrustacea
- Class: Insecta
- Order: Coleoptera
- Suborder: Polyphaga
- Infraorder: Cucujiformia
- Family: Chrysomelidae
- Subfamily: Eumolpinae
- Tribe: Eumolpini
- Genus: Nycterodina; Bechyné, 1951

Type species
- Spintherophyta aulica (= Chrysodina punctatostriata Lefèvre, 1875) Lefèvre, 1884

Genus of leaf beetles from South America

Nycterodina is a genus of leaf beetles in the subfamily Eumolpinae. It is known from South America.

== Species ==
Subgenus Nycterodina Bechyné, 1951

- Nycterodina aciculata (Lefèvre, 1891) – Brazil (Bahia)
- Nycterodina bahiensis (Lefèvre, 1891) – Brazil (Bahia)
- Nycterodina bordoni Bechyné & Bechyné, 1969 – Venezuela
- Nycterodina floralis Bechyné, 1953 – Trinidad, Venezuela
- Nycterodina freyi Bechyné, 1955 – Peru
- Nycterodina ignara Bechyné, 1952 – Brazil (Minas Gerais, São Paulo)
- Nycterodina lanei Bechyné & Bechyné, 1964 – Brazil (São Paulo)
- Nycterodina lilibetha Bechyné, 1955 – Peru
- Nycterodina punctatostriata (Lefèvre, 1875) – Brazil, Paraguay, northern Argentina, Bolivia
- Nycterodina submucronata (Bechyné, 1950) – Brazil (Mato Grosso)
- Nycterodina thoracica (Jacoby, 1900) – The Guianas, Venezuela

Subgenus Nycterodinella Bechyné & Bechyné, 1969 (type species: Nycterodina callifera Bechyné & Bechyné, 1961)

- Nycterodina amazoniae Bechyné & Bechyné, 1961 – Brazil (Amazonas, Pará)
- Nycterodina callifera Bechyné & Bechyné, 1961 – Brazil (Amapá, Pará), French Guiana
- Nycterodina carinifera Bechyné & Bechyné, 1961 – Brazil (Amapá, Pará)
- Nycterodina immetallica Bechyné & Bechyné, 1961 – Brazil (Amazonas, Pará), Bolivia, Venezuela, French Guiana
- Nycterodina isabella Bechyné, 1953 – Bolivia
- Nycterodina lamellifera Bechyné & Bechyné, 1961 – Brazil (Amazonas, Pará), Venezuela
- Nycterodina nigrita (Baly, 1878) – Peru, Bolivia, Brazil (Amazonas, Pará), Venezuela
- Nycterodina subcostata (Jacoby, 1900) – Brazil (Amazonas), Peru
- Nycterodina tincta Bechyné & Bechyné, 1961 – Brazil (Amapá, Pará), Bolivia

Synonyms:

- Nycterodina aulica (Lefèvre, 1884): synonym of Nycterodina punctatostriata (Lefèvre, 1875)
- Nycterodina nigrita (Weise, 1921) (preoccupied by N. nigrita (Baly, 1878)): renamed to Nycterodina amazoniae Bechyné & Bechyné, 1961
