= Metachroma pallidum =

Scientific classification
- Kingdom: Animalia
- Phylum: Arthropoda
- Clade: Pancrustacea
- Class: Insecta
- Order: Coleoptera
- Suborder: Polyphaga
- Infraorder: Cucujiformia
- Family: Chrysomelidae
- Genus: Metachroma
- Species: M. pallidum

Binomial name
- Metachroma pallidum (Say, 1824)

Synonyms
- Colaspis dubiosa Say, 1824; Colaspis pallida Say, 1824

Species of beetle

Metachroma pallidum is a species of leaf beetle. It is found in the United States.
