= Christian Wilhelm Ludwig Eduard Suffrian =

German entomologist (1805–1876)

Christian Wilhelm Ludwig Eduard Suffrian (21 January 1805, Wünsdorf, Teltow-Fläming – 18 August 1876, Bad Rehburg) was a German entomologist who specialized in Coleoptera especially Chrysomelidae.

He was a schoolteacher in Münster. Suffrian wrote many short papers and several monographs in both of which he described new species and genera. His collection is conserved by the Zoological Institute University of Halle-Wittenberg.

Suffrian was a Member of the Halle Entomological Society and the Stettin Entomological Society.

== Works ==
Longer works only

- Revision der Europäischen Arten der Gattung Cryptocephalus. Linn. Ent., 2: 1-194 (1847)
- Revision der Europäischen Arten der Gattung Cryptocephalus. (Fortsetzung und Schluss.). Linn. Ent., 3: 1-152 (1848).
- Zur Kenntnis der Europäischen Chrysomelen. Linn. Ent., 5: 1-280. (1851)
- Verzeichniss der bis jetzt bekannt gewordenen Asiatischen Cryptocephalen. Linn. Ent., 9: 1-169 (1854)
- Berichtigtes Verzeichniss der bis jetzt bekannt gewordenen Asiatischen Cryptocephalen. Linn. Ent., 14: 1-72 (1860).
