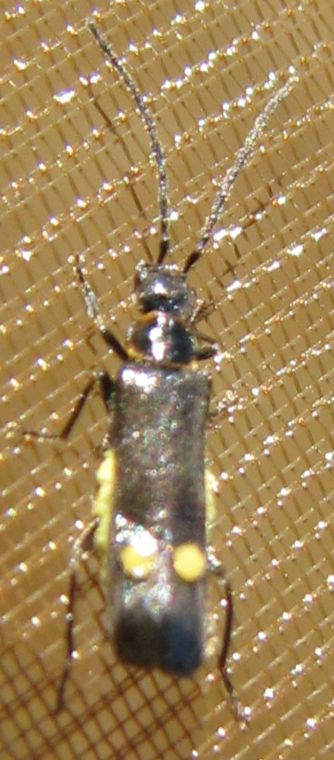
- Malthinus biguttatus

Scientific classification
- Kingdom: Animalia
- Phylum: Arthropoda
- Class: Insecta
- Order: Coleoptera
- Suborder: Polyphaga
- Infraorder: Elateriformia
- Family: Cantharidae
- Subfamily: Malthininae
- Tribe: Malthinini
- Genus: Malthinus; Latreille, 1806

Diversity
- At least 140 species

Synonyms
- Apteromalthinus Escalera, 1913; Indomalthinus Brancucci, 1978; Malachidius Motschulsky, 1859; Progeutes Abeille de Perrin, 1894; Ymnis Gozis, 1886

= Malthinus =

Genus of beetles

Malthinus is a genus of soldier beetles in the family Cantharidae; species have been recorded from Europe, North America and Japan. There are more than 140 described species in Malthinus.

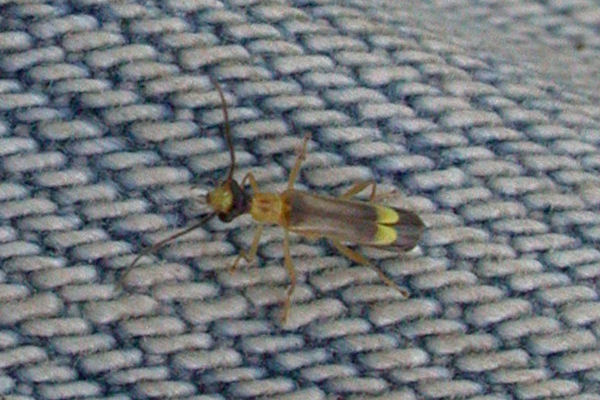
Malthinus flaveolus

== See also ==
- List of Malthinus species
