= George Robert Crotch =

English entomologist

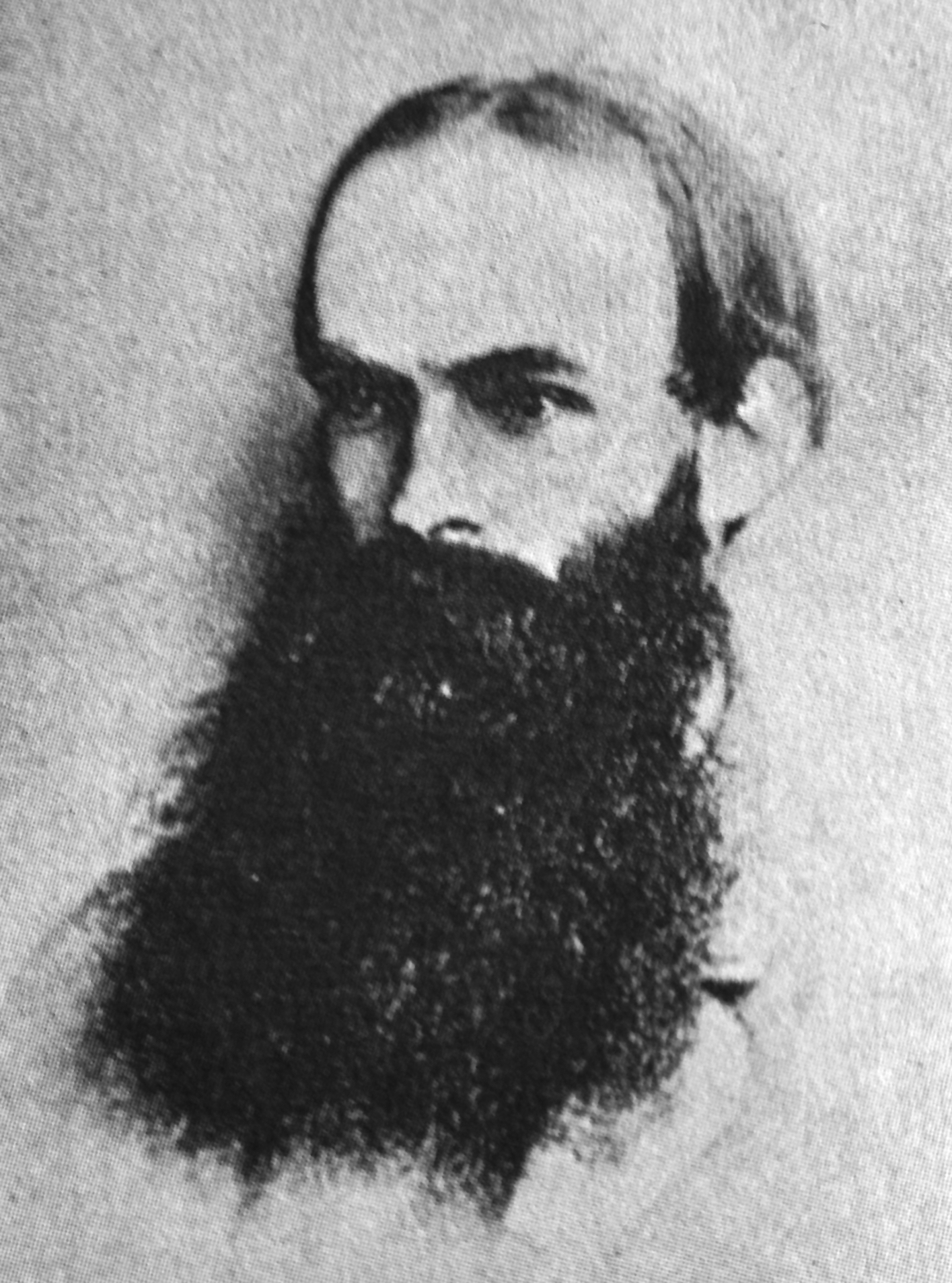
- George R. Crotch c. 1872
- Born: 1842; Somerset, England
- Died: June 16, 1874; Philadelphia, Pennsylvania
- Resting place: Woodland Cemetery, Philadelphia, Pennsylvania
- Scientific career
- Fields: entomology
- Institutions: Tertiary education: University of Cambridge

George Robert Crotch (1842 – 16 June 1874) was a British entomologist and an authority on Coleoptera (beetles), particularly the ladybird beetles. He was the grandson of the English composer and organist William Crotch.

== Biography ==
Born in Taunton, Somerset, England, the son of Reverend W. R. Crotch, he became interested in insects in his childhood. He collected in the Fens and wrote notes from the age of fourteen. He matriculated from St. John's College, Cambridge in 1861 and graduated in 1864. He became more keen on the Coleoptera. He worked as a second assistant librarian in 1866 at the University Library, Cambridge and worked on an MA. He collected insects in Europe, travelling to Italy, Spain, Portugal and the Mediterranean. In the autumn of 1872, he left England on an entomological tour of the world, initially arriving at Philadelphia. In the spring of 1873 he arrived in California, where he collected insects until early July, when he traveled to British Columbia. In 1873 he accepted a position as assistant from Louis Agassiz at the Harvard Museum of Comparative Zoology with Hermann August Hagen. He made collections of Coleoptera and Lepidoptera during 1873 in California, Oregon, and Vancouver Island, as well as various areas of south-central British Columbia. He also contributed to the Zoological Record. He died of tuberculosis in 1874 at the home of Professor Lesley in Philadelphia at age 32.

Crotch was the author of a number of books, including Checklist of the Coleoptera of America (1873) and A revision of the Coleopterous family Coccinellidae (1874). His Coleoptera collection from the Azores is in the British Museum, London while the European Coleoptera, Erotylidae and Coccinellidae were left to the Cambridge University Museum of Zoology.

He was an authority on the Coccinellidae (Ladybird beetles) and Erotylidae of the world. His younger brother William Duppa Crotch was also an entomologist, and the brothers worked together collecting the beetles of Gran Canaria.

He corresponded with Charles Darwin who wrote:

I am greatly indebted to Mr G. R. Crotch for having sent me numerous prepared specimens of various beetles belonging to these three families [Crioceridae, Chrysomelidae, Tenebrionidae] and others, as well as for valuable information of all kinds ... In Carabidae I have examined Elaphrus uliginosus and Blethisa multipunctata, sent to me by Mr Crotch.
