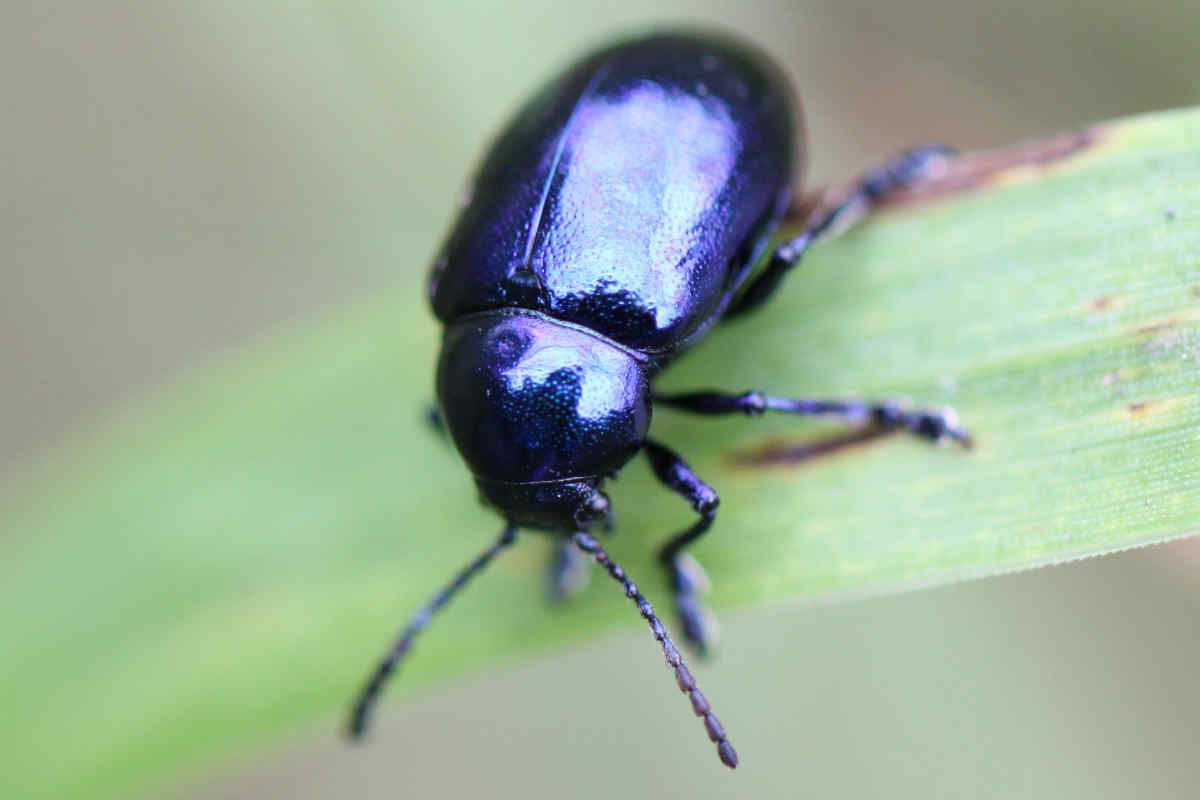

Scientific classification
- Kingdom: Animalia
- Phylum: Arthropoda
- Class: Insecta
- Order: Coleoptera
- Suborder: Polyphaga
- Infraorder: Cucujiformia
- Family: Chrysomelidae
- Genus: Chrysochus
- Species: C. asclepiadeus

Binomial name
- Chrysochus asclepiadeus (Pallas, 1773)

Synonyms
- Chrysomela asclepiadea Pallas, 1773; Cryptocephalus cyanea Olivier, 1791; Chrysomela praetiosa Fabricius, 1792; Chrysochus asclepiadeus asiaeminoris De Monte, 1948

= Chrysochus asclepiadeus =

Species of beetle

Chrysochus asclepiadeus (or Eumolpus asclepiadeus) is a member of the leaf beetle subfamily Eumolpinae. It is considered the type species of the genus Chrysochus, though it has sometimes been placed within the genus Eumolpus. It is the only species of Chrysochus distributed in the western Palaearctic. It is mainly found in Europe, though it is also known from Kazakhstan and Turkey in Asia.

== Taxonomic history ==
The species was first described by Peter Simon Pallas, who gave it the scientific name Chrysomela asclepiadea in 1773. The species epithet, asclepiadea (or asclepiadeus), is named after the milkweed genus Asclepias, one of the species' food plants. The species was later twice described again under two separate names: Guillaume-Antoine Olivier named it Cryptocephalus cyaneus in 1791 (from the Latin cyaneus, meaning "dark blue"), while Johan Christian Fabricius named it Chrysomela praetiosa in 1792. The latter was sometimes spelled "pretiosa", derived from the Latin pretiosus ("valuable, precious").

In 1798, the genus Eumolpus was first established in Johann Karl Wilhelm Illiger's Verzeichniß der Käfer Preußens, including C. praetiosa as well as other species. Fabricius also included C. praetiosa in the same genus in 1801. In 1836, C. praetiosa was transferred again to the genus Chrysochus, which was first established by Louis Alexandre Auguste Chevrolat in Dejean's Catalogue des Coléoptères. Chrysomela praetiosa was then designated as the type species of the genus by Sylvain Auguste de Marseul in 1864. It was later discovered that Chrysomela praetiosa was a junior synonym of Chrysomela asclepiadea, changing the valid scientific name for the species to Chrysochus asclepiadeus.

In 1993, Warchałowski used the combination "Eumolpus asclepiadeus" for the species, based on Jacquelin du Val's work from 1868 where Chrysochus was considered a synonym of Eumolpus. He also designated E. praetiosus as the type species of Eumolpus, stating that the species of Chrysochus must be included in the genus. Some European entomologists followed Warchałowski, while others continued to use Chrysochus as valid. Warchałowski's type designation for Eumolpus was invalid, since Latreille had designated Eumolpus vitis as the type species in 1810, which placed Bromius in synonymy with Eumolpus. This threatened stability for Eumolpus, Bromius and Chrysochus. In 2010, an application was made to the International Commission on Zoological Nomenclature to conserve the three genus names by suppressing the name Eumolpus Illiger, 1798. This was accepted by the ICZN in 2012.

== Subspecies ==
In recent literature, Chrysochus asclepiadeus is usually listed as including two subspecies, Chrysochus asclepiadeus asclepiadeus and Chrysochus asclepiadeus asiaeminoris. The nominate subspecies, C. a. asclepiadeus, has a wide distribution range in Europe, while C. a. asiaeminoris is known only from Babadağ, Denizli in southwestern Turkey (its type locality) and has not been reported since its description in 1948. In 2015, Ekiz et al. found that the two subspecies are not geographically distinct and are morphologically very similar, and concluded that C. a. asiaeminoris is actually a synonym of the nominate subspecies.

== Description ==
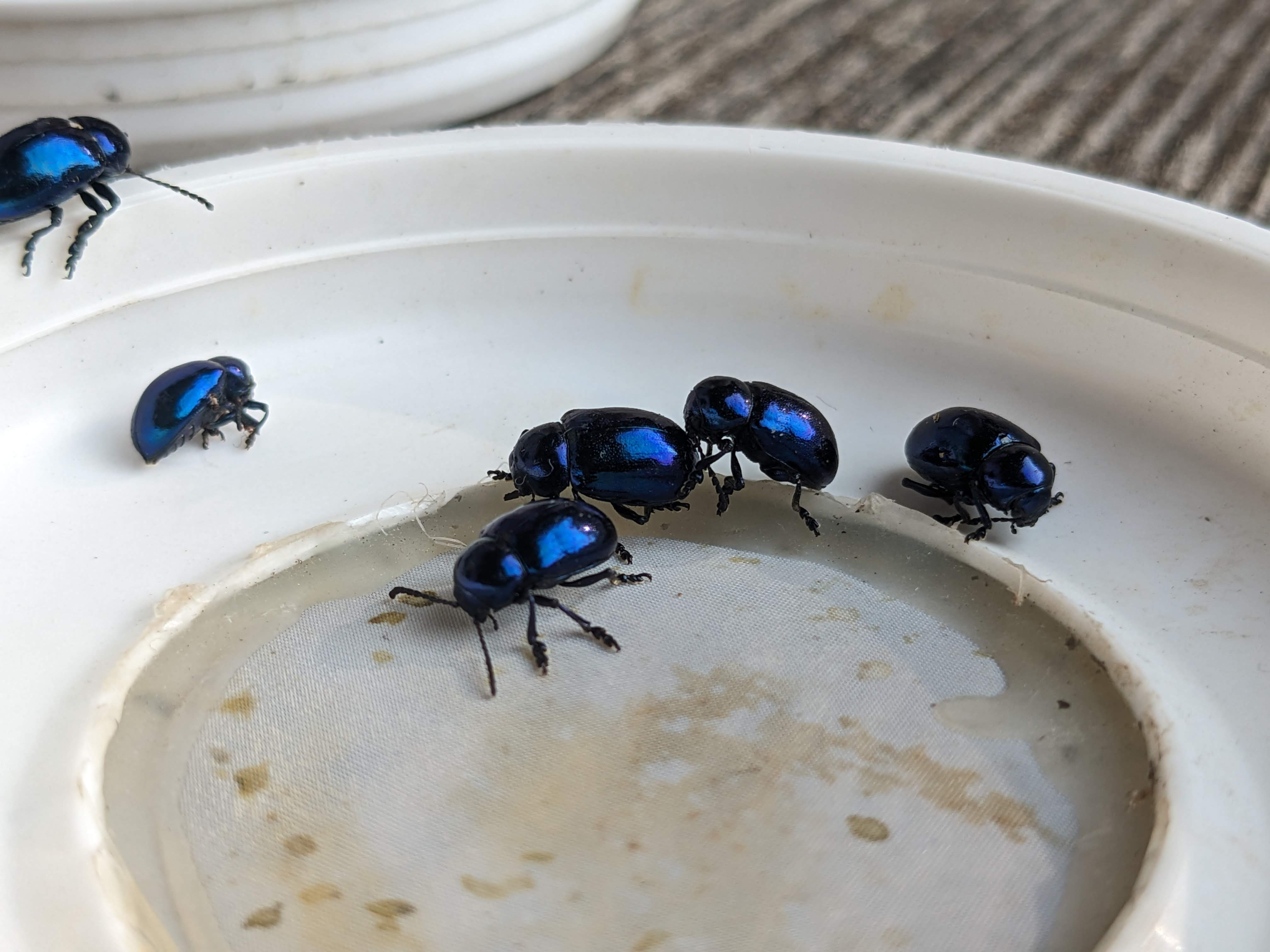
Adult C. asclepiadeus collected from the French Jura.

C. asclepiadeus has a dark blue body with a purplish metallic reflection. Adult males have an average length of 9.3 mm and an average width of 4.9 mm. Adult females are generally similar to males, but larger; they have an average length of 10.2 mm and average width of 5.4 mm.

== Biology ==
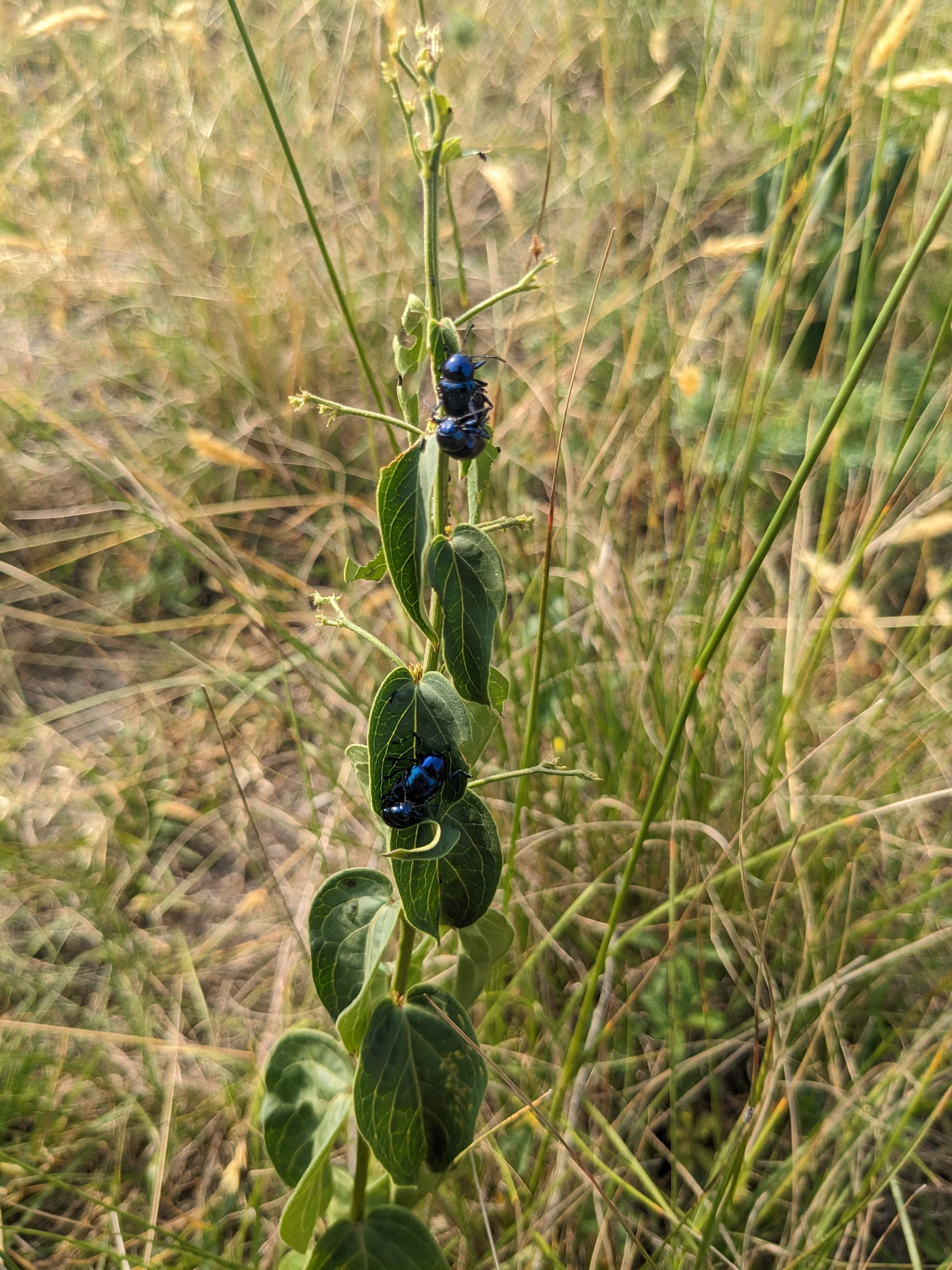
Adult C. asclepiadeus feeding on Vincetoxicum hirundinaria, a preferred host plant.

When disturbed, C. asclepiadeus releases a defensive secretion from glands on the protonum and elytra. The main components of this secretion are phenylalanine, tryptophane, leucine and diacetyl putrescine. Unlike the secretions of North American species Chrysochus auratus and Chrysochus cobaltinus, the secretion of C. asclepiadeus does not contain cardenolides.

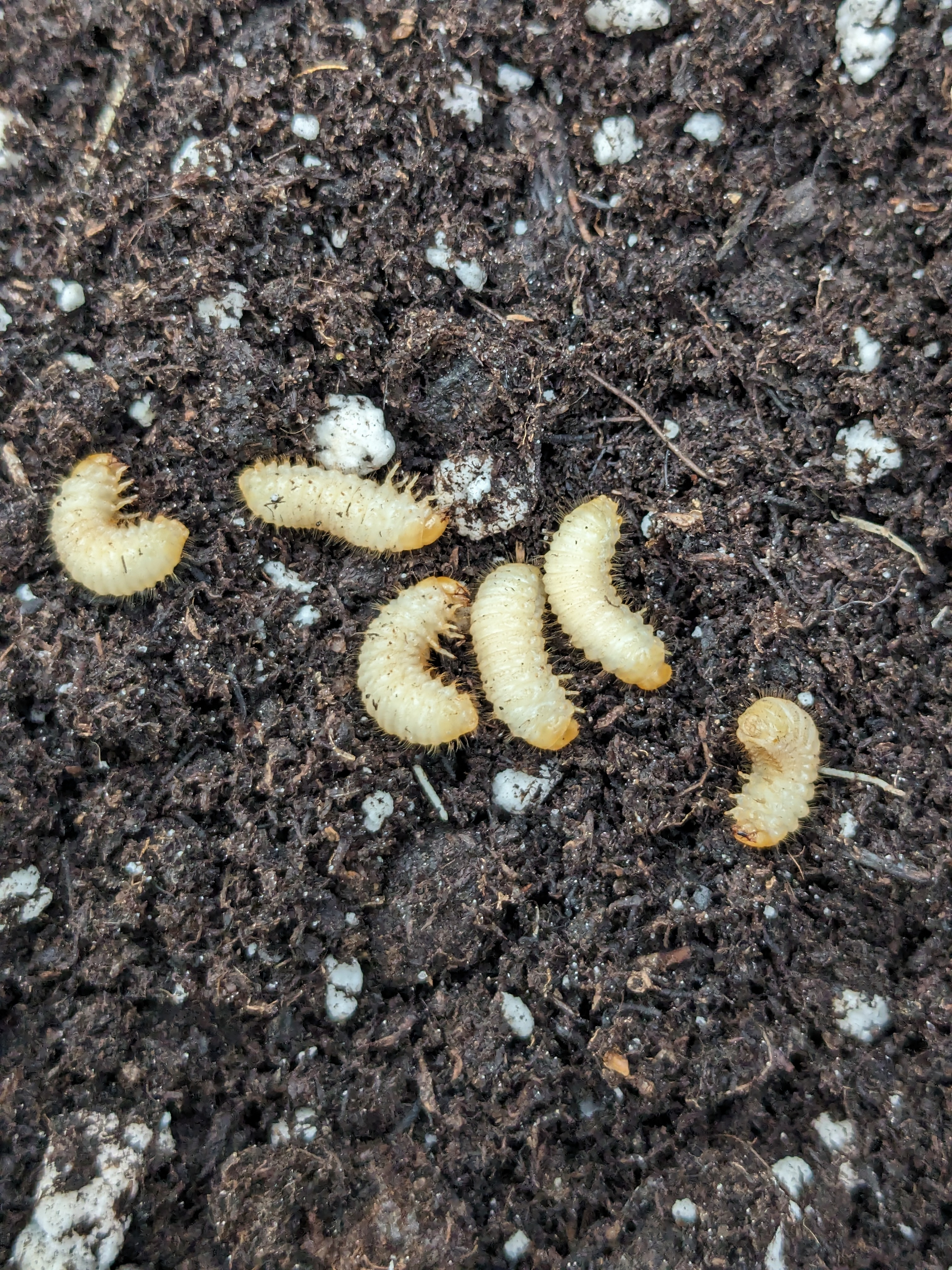
Late-instar larvae of C. asclepiadeus.

== Distribution ==
C. asclepiadeus is distributed in Armenia, Austria, Azerbaijan, Croatia, the Czech Republic, France, Germany, Greece, Hungary, Italy, Kazakhstan, Moldavia, Montenegro, North Macedonia, Poland, Russia (Southern European Territory), Serbia, Slovakia, Switzerland, Turkey and Ukraine.

== Gallery ==
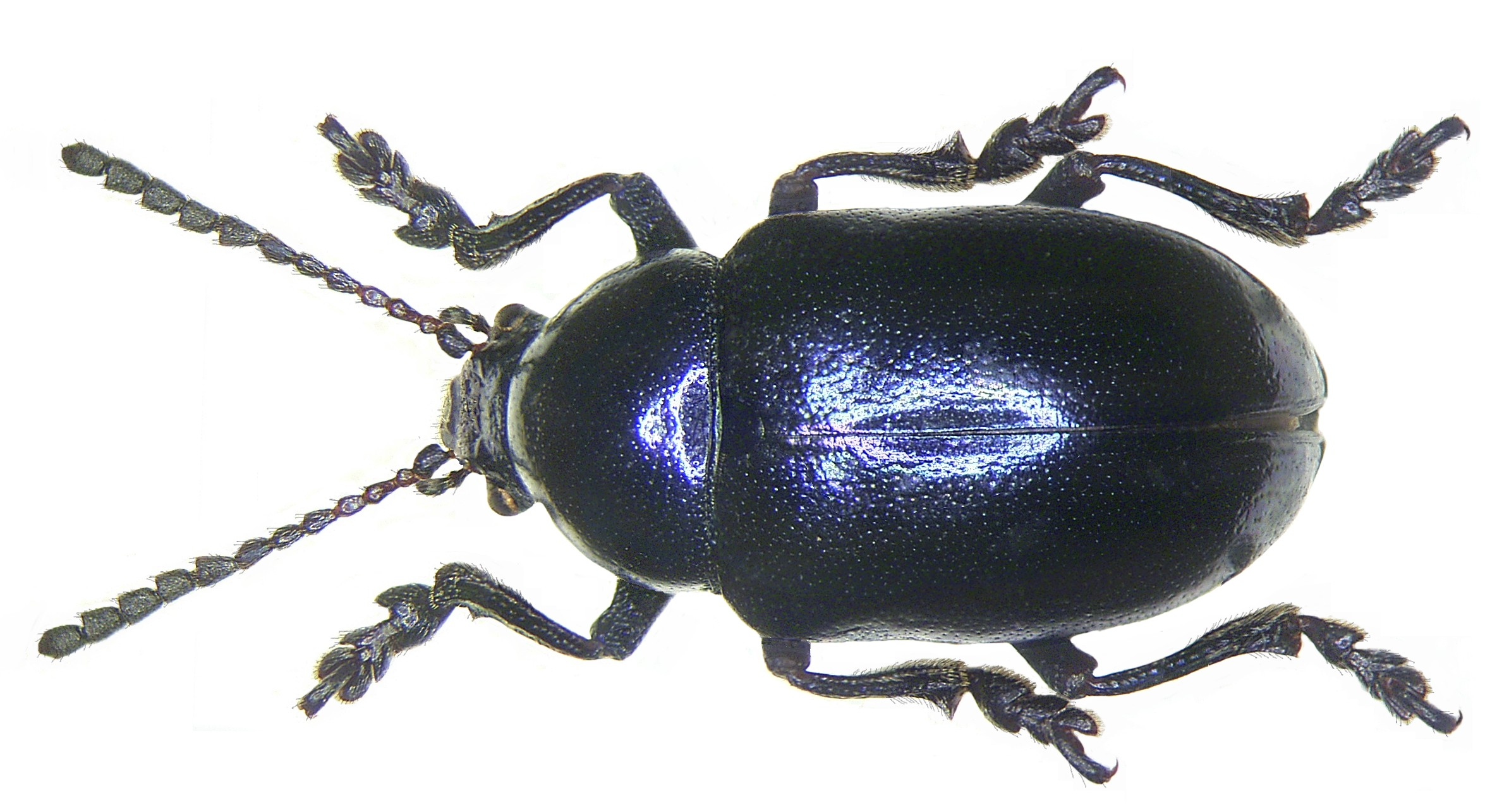

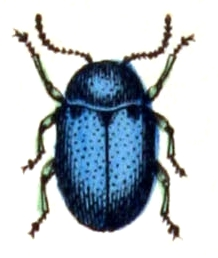
