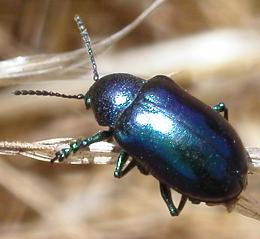
- Chrysochus cobaltinus

Scientific classification
- Kingdom: Animalia
- Phylum: Arthropoda
- Clade: Pancrustacea
- Class: Insecta
- Order: Coleoptera
- Suborder: Polyphaga
- Infraorder: Cucujiformia
- Family: Chrysomelidae
- Subfamily: Eumolpinae
- Tribe: Eumolpini
- Genus: Chrysochus; Chevrolat in Dejean, 1836

Type species
- Chrysomela praetiosa (= Chrysomela asclepiadea Pallas, 1773) Fabricius, 1792

Synonyms
- Atymius Gistel, 1848; Eumolpus sensu auct.

= Chrysochus =

Genus of beetles

Chrysochus is a genus of leaf beetles in the subfamily Eumolpinae. It is known from North America, Europe and Asia.

== Etymology ==
The name of the genus is derived from the Greek word χρυσοχόος (chrysochóos), meaning "goldsmith".

== Taxonomic history ==
In 1836, the genus Chrysochus was first established by Louis Alexandre Auguste Chevrolat in Dejean's Catalogue des Coléoptères, including the species Chrysomela asiatica Pallas, 1771, C. aurata Fabricius, 1775 and C. pretiosa Fabricius, 1792 (now Chrysochares asiaticus, Chrysochus auratus and Chrysochus asclepiadeus, respectively). Chrysomela praetiosa was designated as the type species of the genus by Sylvain Auguste de Marseul in 1864.

The generic name Chrysochus Chevrolat in Dejean, 1836 is a conserved name. It was threatened by Eumolpus in the sense used by Kugelann in Illiger, 1798, which included Chrysomela praetiosa. An application to conserve Chrysochus and other names by suppressing Eumolpus Illiger, 1798 was accepted by the International Commission on Zoological Nomenclature in 2012.

== Species ==
There are at least eight described species in Chrysochus. Six are found in the Palearctic realm, and only two are found in North America.

List of Chrysochus species
Scientific name	Authority	Range	Common name	Image
Chrysochus asclepiadeus	(Pallas, 1773)	Widespread across Europe, also found in Kazakhstan and Turkey		
Chrysochus auratus	(Fabricius, 1775)	Eastern North America	Dogbane beetle	
Chrysochus brevefasciatus	Pic, 1934	Shanghai, China		
Chrysochus chinensis	Baly, 1859	Central, North and Northeast China, Japan, Mongolia and the Russian Far East		
Chrysochus cobaltinus	LeConte, 1857	Western United States and British Columbia	Blue milkweed beetle	
Chrysochus globicollis	Lefèvre, 1888	Northeast China, the Russian Far East and North Korea		
Chrysochus goniostoma	Weise, 1889	North and Northeast China, Mongolia, and the Russian Far East		
Chrysochus sikhima	Jacoby, 1908	Sikkim, India		

Another species, Chrysochus mniszechi, was described in 1877 by Édouard Lefèvre, from three specimens he had seen (one in the collection of Georges Mniszech, and two from Henry Deyrolle's). While he did not know where the specimens were collected from, Lefèvre thought that they probably came from North America.

The following species, all from the Oriental realm, were formerly included in Chrysochus. They were transferred to the genera Parheminodes and Platycorynus in 2021:

- Chrysochus conspectus Lefèvre, 1890: moved to Parheminodes
- Chrysochus hageni Jacoby, 1884: moved to Parheminodes
- Chrysochus languei Lefèvre, 1893: moved to Platycorynus
- Chrysochus massiei Lefèvre, 1893: moved to Parheminodes
- Chrysochus mouhoti Baly, 1864: moved to Parheminodes
- Chrysochus nilgiriensis Jacoby, 1908: moved to Parheminodes
- Chrysochus pulcher Baly, 1864: moved to Parheminodes

== Biology ==
All species of Chryochus feed on plants in the Apocynaceae (dogbane) and Asclepiadaceae (milkweed) families. A small mutation has allowed the two North American species, C. auratus and C. cobaltinus, in particular to feed on the plant species containing cardenolides, while all other species of the genus feed on plant species without cardenolides.

Chryochus beetles by location differ in their exoskeleton color due to varying factors such as temperature, humidity, diet, and adaptation to predators. For example, Chryochus larvae as they pupate regulate the chemicals involved in pigment control that depend on the temperature.

== Cultural impact ==
Naturalist and artist Christopher Marley has used species of Chrysochus as the artistic medium in his mosaic art pieces.
