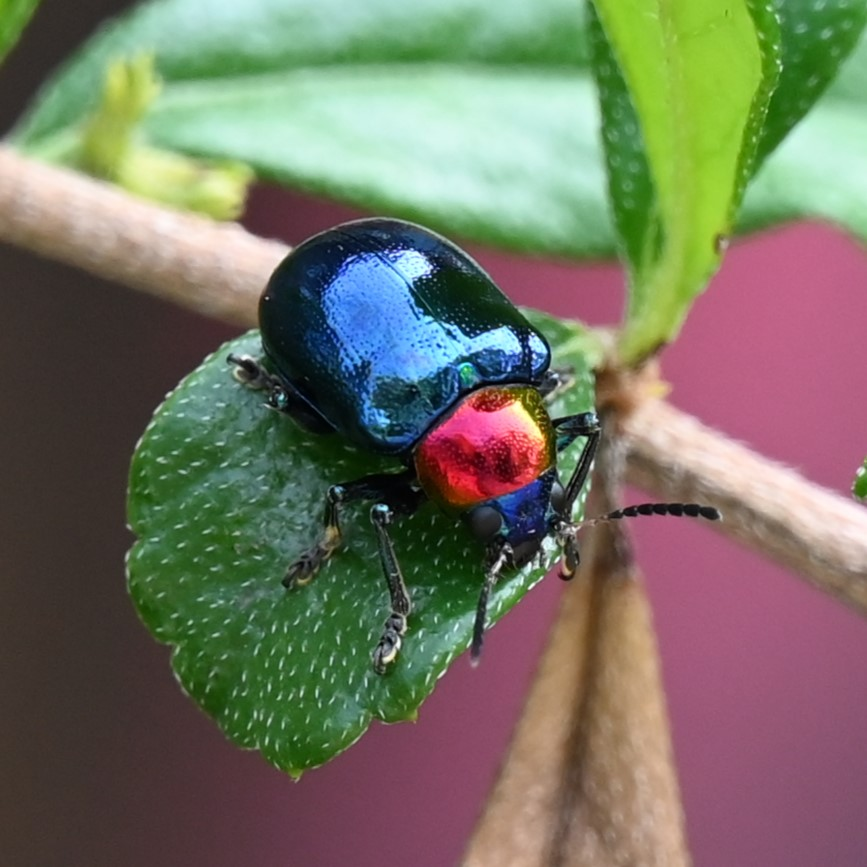

Scientific classification
- Kingdom: Animalia
- Phylum: Arthropoda
- Clade: Pancrustacea
- Class: Insecta
- Order: Coleoptera
- Suborder: Polyphaga
- Infraorder: Cucujiformia
- Family: Chrysomelidae
- Genus: Parheminodes
- Species: P. pulcher

Binomial name
- Parheminodes pulcher (Baly, 1864)

Synonyms
- Chrysochus pulcher Baly, 1864

= Parheminodes pulcher =

Species of beetle

Parheminodes pulcher is a species of Parheminodes, a genus of leaf beetles.

== Description ==
Parheminodes pulcher has a metallic purplish-blue body and head, a reddish-yellow thorax, and black labrum, legs, and antennae. The elytra are slightly wider at the base than at the thorax. The head and thorax are lightly punctate, and the elytra are more strongly punctured in approximate rows. Body size is 7–8 millimetres (0.28–0.31 in) in length with no size difference between sexes described.

== Range ==
The species is native to Asia with a range including Myanmar, Peninsular Malaysia, Thailand, Cambodia, Laos, Vietnam, and Hainan. According to Moseyko (2021), this species is actually restricted to Peninsular Malaysia.

== Taxonomic history ==
This species was originally described by Joseph Sugar Baly in 1864 under the genus Chrysochus. In 2021 this species was moved to the genus Parheminodes. The species Platycorynus languei, Parheminodes mouhoti, P. conspectus and P. massiei were formerly placed in synonymy with this species, but in 2021 they all were determined to be separate species.

== Gallery ==
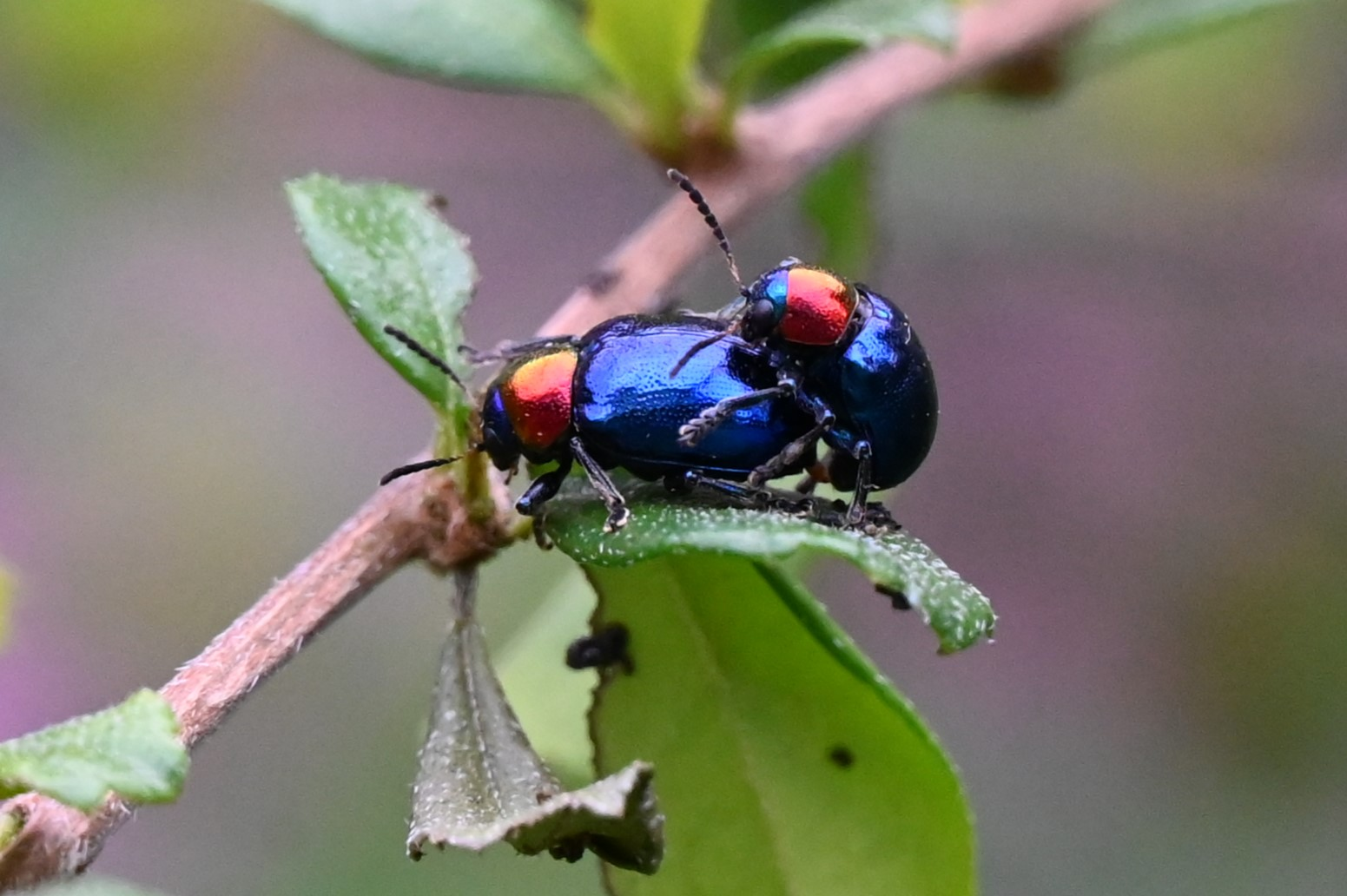
A pair of Parheminodes pulcher mating

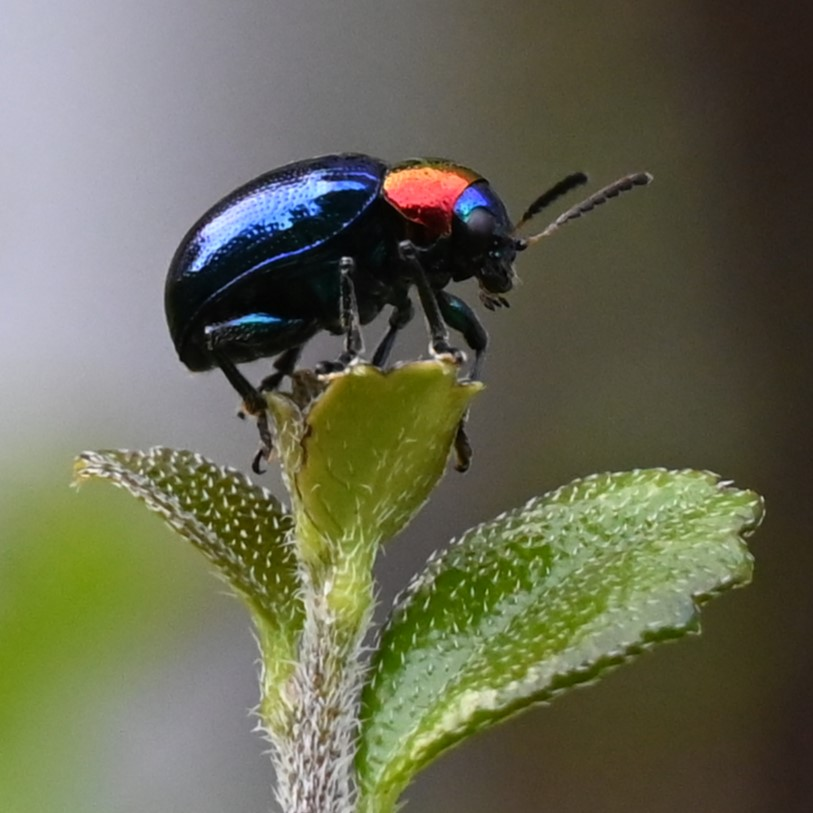
Side view of a Parheminodes pulcher
