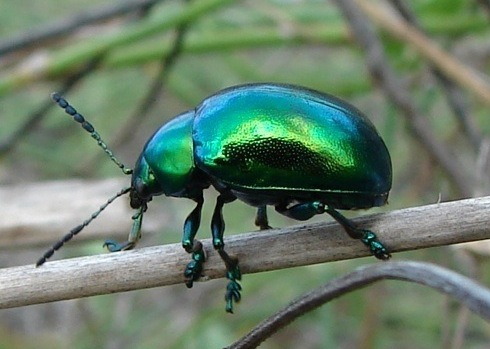
- Eumolpus robustus, Mexico

Scientific classification
- Kingdom: Animalia
- Phylum: Arthropoda
- Clade: Pancrustacea
- Class: Insecta
- Order: Coleoptera
- Suborder: Polyphaga
- Infraorder: Cucujiformia
- Family: Chrysomelidae
- Genus: Eumolpus
- Species: E. robustus

Binomial name
- Eumolpus robustus (Horn, 1885)

Synonyms
- Chrysochus robustus Horn, 1885

= Eumolpus robustus =

Species of beetle

Eumolpus robustus is a species of leaf beetle from North America. It has the most northern range of the members of the genus Eumolpus, spanning from Central America north to Mexico and Arizona.

== History of research ==
Eumolpus robustus was first described as Chrysochus robustus by the American entomologist George Henry Horn in 1885, from specimens collected in Arizona. However, Horn later synonymised it with Eumolpus surinamensis, following Martin Jacoby's description from 1882. In Špringlová's revision of the genus Eumolpus in 1960, E. robustus was restored as a separate species within the genus, as it was determined to be a very different species from E. surinamensis.

== Description ==
Adults have a length of 10–14 mm. They are colored green, blue, coppery or purple, and have shiny strongly-punctuated elytra.

== Distribution ==
E. robustus is distributed from Central America north to Mexico and Arizona. In Central America, it is recorded from Costa Rica, Nicaragua, El Salvador, Honduras and Guatemala.

== Food plants ==
E. robustus feeds on plants in the family Apocynaceae. In Central America, it is associated with plants of the genera Gonolobus and Funastrum. In Mexico, it has been recorded from the species Parkinsonia aculeata.
