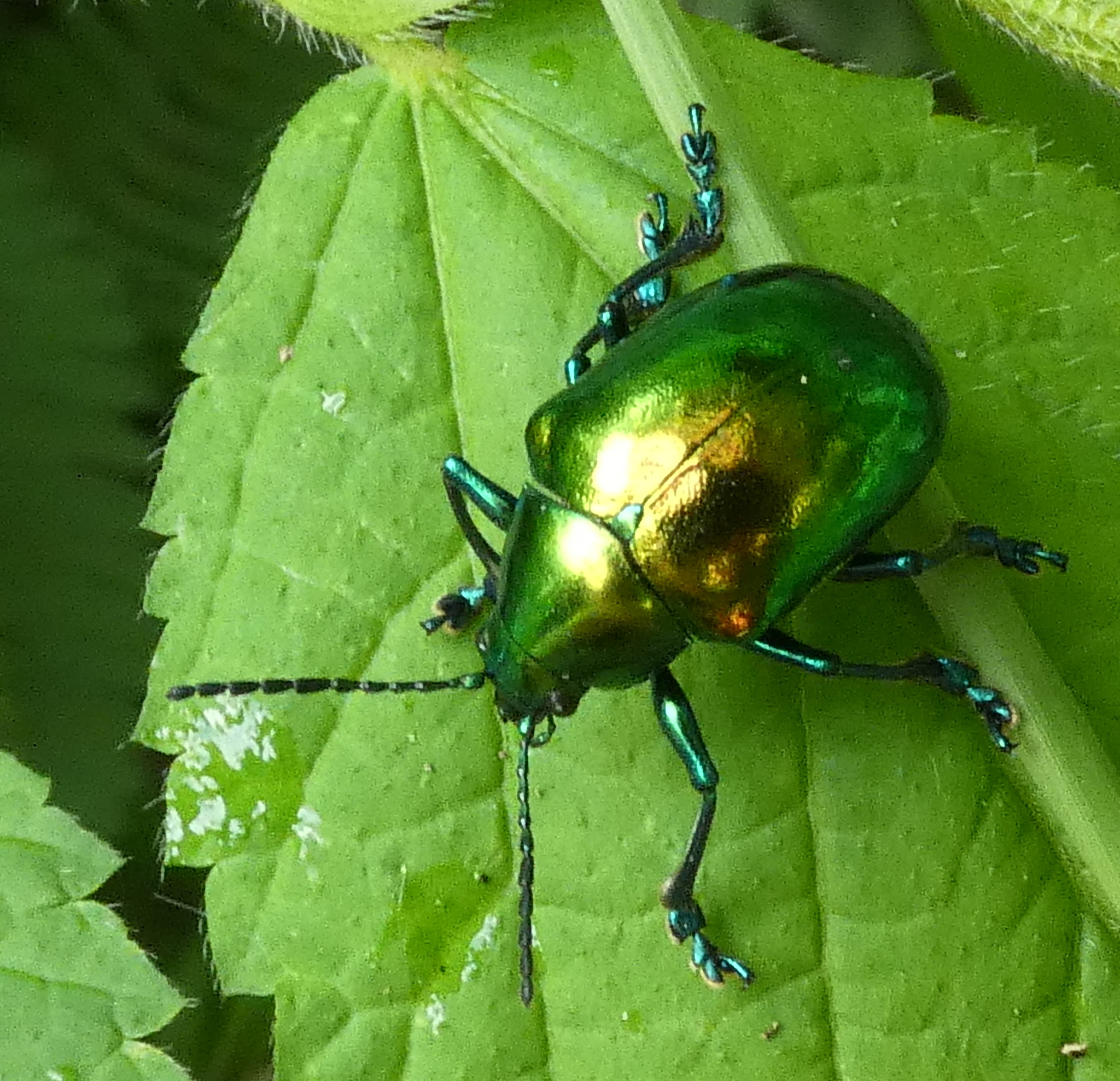
- Eumolpus ignitus, Brazil

Scientific classification
- Kingdom: Animalia
- Phylum: Arthropoda
- Clade: Pancrustacea
- Class: Insecta
- Order: Coleoptera
- Suborder: Polyphaga
- Infraorder: Cucujiformia
- Family: Chrysomelidae
- Subfamily: Eumolpinae
- Tribe: Eumolpini
- Genus: Eumolpus; Weber, 1801

Type species
- Chrysomela ignita Fabricius, 1787

Species
- See text

Synonyms
- Endoxus Kirby, 1837; Alphites Chapuis, 1874

= Eumolpus (beetle) =

Genus of leaf beetles

Eumolpus is a genus of leaf beetles in the subfamily Eumolpinae. It includes 40 species, most of which have a large size and include some of the largest members of the subfamily. They are distributed throughout the Neotropical realm, though one species (Eumolpus robustus) has been recorded as far north as Arizona (in the United States).

== Etymology ==
The name of the genus is either derived from the Ancient Greek εὔμολπος (eúmolpos), or is named after Eumolpus from Greek mythology, who was the son of Poseidon and Chione.

== Taxonomic history ==
The genus in its current sense is attributed to Weber, 1801. However, the name Eumolpus was first used in Johann Karl Wilhelm Illiger's Verzeichniß der Käfer Preußens in 1798, where it was attributed to Johann Gottlieb Kugelann, and originally consisted of European species now placed in the genera Chrysochus and Bromius.

While most authors followed Weber, 1801, some recent European entomologists have followed Warchałowski, who synonymised Chrysochus with Eumolpus in 1993, designating Chrysomela praetiosa as the type species of Eumolpus. This designation by Warchałowski was invalid, since Latreille had designated Cryptocephalus vitis as the type species of Eumolpus in 1810, which placed Bromius in synonymy with Eumolpus. This threatened stability for Eumolpus, Bromius and Chrysochus.

In 2010, an application was made to the International Commission on Zoological Nomenclature to conserve the names Eumolpus Weber, 1801, Chrysochus Chevrolat in Dejean, 1836 and Bromius Chevrolat in Dejean, 1836 by suppressing the name Eumolpus Illiger, 1798, and to set aside all type species designations for Eumolpus before Hope's designation of Chrysomela ignita Fabricius, 1787 in 1840. This was accepted by the ICZN in 2012.

== Gallery ==
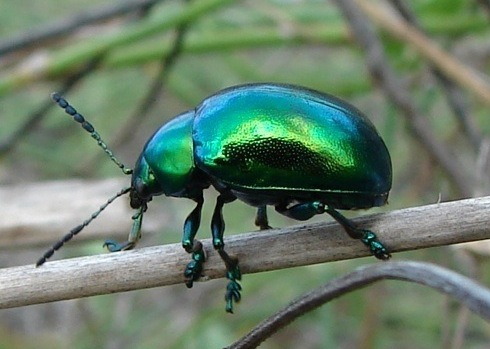
Eumolpus robustus, Mexico

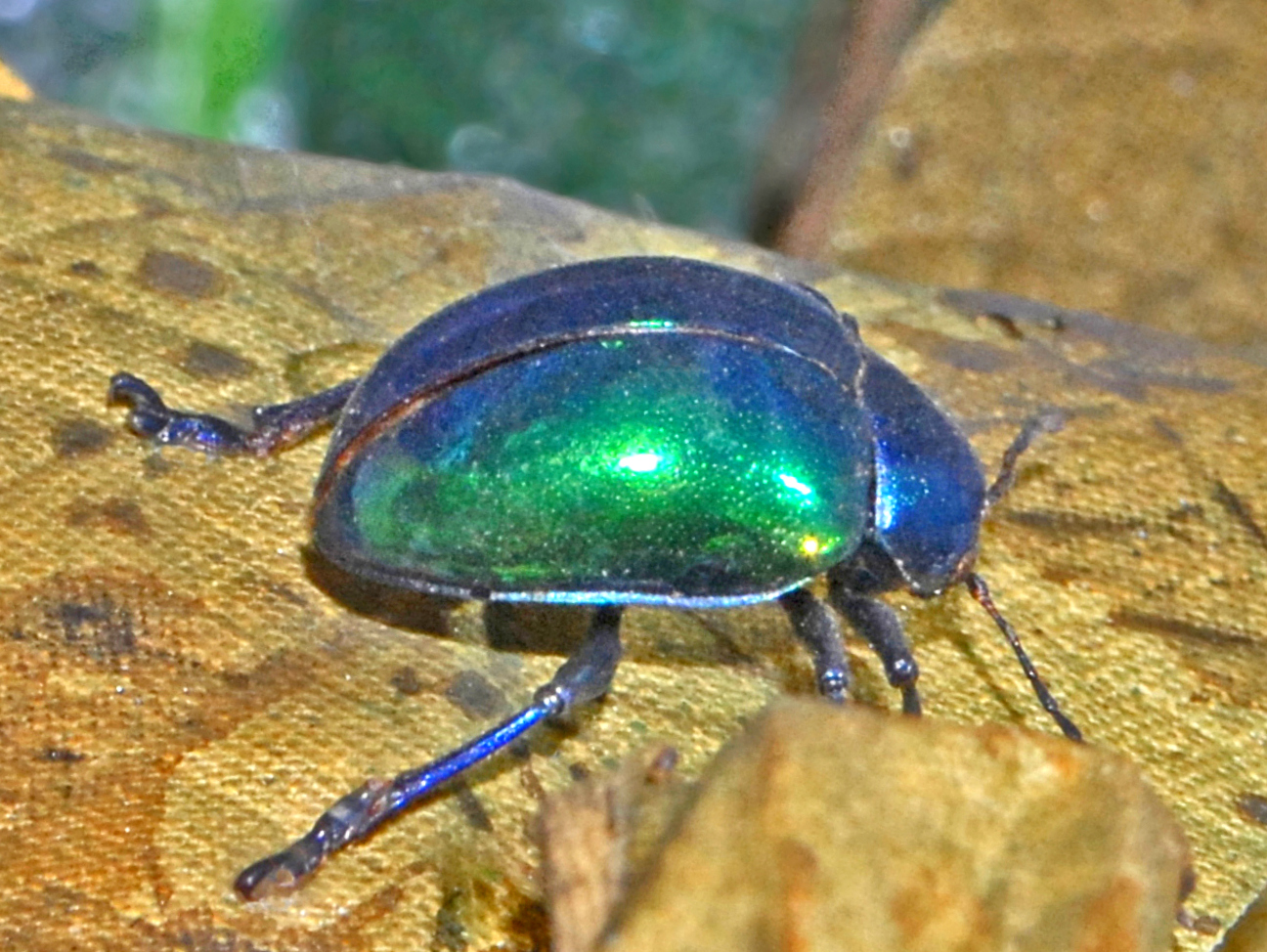
Mounted specimen of Eumolpus sp. on display at the Museo Civico di Storia Naturale di Milano

== Species ==
The following species are described in Eumolpus:

- Eumolpus alutaceus Germar, 1824 – Brazil
- Eumolpus antonius Špringlová, 1960 – Brazil
- Eumolpus ardens Špringlová, 1960 – Brazil
- Eumolpus australis Baly, 1877 – Argentina, Paraguay, Bolivia
- Eumolpus bucki Špringlová, 1960 – Argentina, Uruaguay, Paraguay, Brazil
- Eumolpus caesareus Špringlová, 1960 – Brazil
- Eumolpus caryophorus Špringlová, 1960 – Brazil
- Eumolpus clavipalpus (Chapuis, 1874)
  - Eumolpus clavipalpus clavipalpus (Chapuis, 1874) – Brazil
  - Eumolpus clavipalpus sigmulus Špringlová, 1960 – Brazil
- Eumolpus corrientinus Špringlová, 1960
  - Eumolpus corrientinus corrientinus Špringlová, 1960 – Argentina
  - Eumolpus corrientinus humeralis Špringlová, 1960 – Paraguay
- Eumolpus cupreus Olivier, 1808
  - Eumolpus cupreus cupreus Olivier, 1808 – Brazil
  - Eumolpus cupreus paulus Špringlová, 1960 – Brazil
- Eumolpus cyaneus (Sulzer, 1776) – Brazil
- Eumolpus divisus Špringlová, 1960
  - Eumolpus divisus divisus Špringlová, 1960 – Brazil
  - Eumolpus divisus laevipleurus Špringlová, 1960 – Brazil
  - Eumolpus divisus ludicrus Špringlová, 1960 – Brazil, Paraguay, Argentina, Bolivia
  - Eumolpus divisus purpurascens Špringlová, 1960 – Argentina
  - Eumolpus divisus recticollis Špringlová, 1960 – Argentina
- Eumolpus episternalis Špringlová, 1960 – Brazil
- Eumolpus franciscus Špringlová, 1960
  - Eumolpus franciscus fortis Špringlová, 1960 – Bolivia, Paraguay, Brazil, Argentina
  - Eumolpus franciscus fortissimus Špringlová, 1960 – Brazil
  - Eumolpus franciscus franciscus Špringlová, 1960 – Bolivia
- Eumolpus fulgidus Weber, 1801 – Brazil
- Eumolpus gigas (Herbst, 1784) – French Guiana, Brazil
- Eumolpus glaberrimus (Gmelin, 1788)
  - Eumolpus glaberrimus glaberrimus (Gmelin, 1788) – Trinidad, Guianas
  - Eumolpus glaberrimus tapajosensis Špringlová, 1960 – Brazil
  - Eumolpus glaberrimus tinctipes Špringlová, 1960 – Brazil
- Eumolpus ignitus (Fabricius, 1787) – Brazil
- Eumolpus incisellus Špringlová, 1960 – Brazil, Paraguay, Argentina, Bolivia
- Eumolpus insulatus Špringlová, 1960 – Paraguay
- Eumolpus itataiensis Špringlová, 1960
  - Eumolpus itataiensis itataiensis Špringlová, 1960 – Brazil
  - Eumolpus itataiensis planicollis Špringlová, 1960 – Brazil
- Eumolpus janus Špringlová, 1960 – Brazil
- Eumolpus mauliki Papp, 1952 – Brazil
- Eumolpus minutus Špringlová, 1960
  - Eumolpus minutus aureolus Špringlová, 1960 – Paraguay, Brazil
  - Eumolpus minutus minutus Špringlová, 1960 – Argentina, Paraguay, Brazil
- Eumolpus nitidus Baly, 1877
  - Eumolpus nitidus facilis Špringlová, 1960 – Guianas
  - Eumolpus nitidus nitidus Baly, 1877 – Brazil
- Eumolpus olivieri Clavareau, 1914 – Brazil, Paraguay, Argentina
- Eumolpus opacus Špringlová, 1960
  - Eumolpus opacus ablatus Špringlová, 1960 – Bolivia, Peru, Brazil,
  - Eumolpus opacus grandis Špringlová, 1960 – Brazil, Paraguay, Argentina
  - Eumolpus opacus opacus Špringlová, 1960 – Brazil
- Eumolpus oppositus Špringlová, 1960 – Brazil, Paraguay, Bolivia, Argentina
- Eumolpus oreinoides Špringlová, 1960 – Brazil
- Eumolpus palpalis Špringlová, 1960 – Ecuador
- Eumolpus pereirai Špringlová, 1960 – Brazil
- Eumolpus polychromus Špringlová, 1960 – Brazil
- Eumolpus robustus (Horn, 1885) – United States (Arizona), Mexico, Guatemala, Honduras, El Salvador, Nicaragua, Costa Rica
- Eumolpus separatus Baly, 1877 – Brazil, Paraguay, Argentina
- Eumolpus sigmus Špringlová, 1960 – Argentina, Bolivia, Paraguay, Brazil
- Eumolpus sophiae Kolbe, 1901 – Colombia, Venezuela
- Eumolpus surinamensis (Fabricius, 1775)
  - Eumolpus surinamensis forcipatus Špringlová, 1960 – Peru
  - Eumolpus surinamensis maracayus Špringlová, 1960 – Venezuela, Colombia
  - Eumolpus surinamensis surinamensis (Fabricius, 1775) – Trinidad, Guianas
  - Eumolpus surinamensis viridanus Špringlová, 1960 – Brazil
- Eumolpus tafti Špringlová, 1960 – Brazil
- Eumolpus truncatus Špringlová, 1960 – Brazil
- Eumolpus viriditarsis Špringlová, 1960
  - Eumolpus viriditarsis crassus Špringlová, 1960 – Bolivia
  - Eumolpus viriditarsis panamae Špringlová, 1960 – Colombia, Panama, Costa Rica
  - Eumolpus viriditarsis pebasus Špringlová, 1960 – Peru
  - Eumolpus viriditarsis rudis Špringlová, 1960 – Ecuador, Peru
  - Eumolpus viriditarsis scintillans Špringlová, 1960 – Peru
  - Eumolpus viriditarsis viriditarsis Špringlová, 1960 – Colombia, Peru, Brazil

Species now placed in Longeumolpus:

- Eumolpus carinatus Baly, 1877
- Eumolpus imperialis Baly, 1877
- Eumolpus prasinus Erichson, 1847
- Eumolpus speciosus Baly, 1877
- Eumolpus subcostatus (Lefèvre, 1885)
