= Longeumolpus =

Scientific classification
- Kingdom: Animalia
- Phylum: Arthropoda
- Clade: Pancrustacea
- Class: Insecta
- Order: Coleoptera
- Suborder: Polyphaga
- Infraorder: Cucujiformia
- Family: Chrysomelidae
- Subfamily: Eumolpinae
- Tribe: Eumolpini
- Genus: Longeumolpus; Špringlová, 1960

Type species
- Eumolpus imperialis Baly, 1877

Genus of leaf beetles

Longeumolpus is a genus of leaf beetles in the subfamily Eumolpinae. It is mainly found in South America, though the type species (Longeumolpus imperialis) has also been reported from Martinique in the Lesser Antilles of the West Indies. The genus was established in 1960 by the Czech entomologist Bohumila Špringlová de Bechyně (wife of Jan Bechyně) as a close relative of Eumolpus.

One of the generic characters separating Longeumolpus from Eumolpus is the length of the aedeagus in the males: in Eumolpus, the aedeagus is short, and always less than half the length of the abdomen, while in Longeumolpus, the aedeagus is very long and is at least three quarters of the abdomen's length.

== Species ==
The following species are described in Longeumolpus:

- Longeumolpus amabilis Špringlová, 1960
  - Longeumolpus amabilis amabilis Špringlová, 1960 – Peru, Brazil
  - Longeumolpus amabilis pebensis Špringlová, 1960 – Peru
  - Longeumolpus amabilis weyrauchi Špringlová, 1960 – Peru
- Longeumolpus batesi (Baly, 1877)
  - Longeumolpus batesi batesi (Baly, 1877) – Brazil
  - Longeumolpus batesi benjaminus Špringlová, 1960 – Brazil
- Longeumolpus bolivianus Špringlová, 1960 – Bolivia
- Longeumolpus carinatus (Baly, 1877) – Brazil, Peru, Colombia
- Longeumolpus compar Špringlová, 1960 – Peru
- Longeumolpus dimorphus Špringlová, 1960 – Brazil
- Longeumolpus emigratus Špringlová, 1960
  - Longeumolpus emigratus emigratus Špringlová, 1960 – Peru
  - Longeumolpus emigratus mesosternalis Špringlová, 1960 – Bolivia
- Longeumolpus ferox Špringlová, 1960
  - Longeumolpus ferox borbensis Špringlová, 1960 – Brazil
  - Longeumolpus ferox ferox Špringlová, 1960 – Brazil
  - Longeumolpus ferox parkoi Špringlová, 1960 – Brazil
- Longeumolpus imperialis (Baly, 1877) – French Guiana, Martinique
- Longeumolpus laeviusculus Špringlová, 1960
  - Longeumolpus laeviusculus corpulentus Špringlová, 1960 – Brazil
  - Longeumolpus laeviusculus discocostatus Špringlová, 1960 – Brazil
  - Longeumolpus laeviusculus laeviusculus Špringlová, 1960 – Peru
  - Longeumolpus laeviusculus manesus Špringlová, 1960 – Brazil
- Longeumolpus prasinus (Erichson, 1847) – Peru
- Longeumolpus spathulatus Špringlová, 1960 – Brazil
- Longeumolpus speciosus (Baly, 1877) – Guianas, Brazil
- Longeumolpus stenotypus Špringlová, 1960 – Ecuador
- Longeumolpus subcostatus (Lefèvre, 1885)
  - Longeumolpus subcostatus sabanillensis Špringlová, 1960 – Colombia
  - Longeumolpus subcostatus subcostatus (Lefèvre, 1885) – Ecudador
