= Christopher Marley =

Naturalist and artist

- Born: January 7, 1969 (age 57); Covina, California
- Education: Brigham Young University
- Occupations: Artist, photographer, naturalist, author
- Notable work: Pheromone: The Insect Artwork of Christopher Marley; Biophilia; Exquisite Creatures
- Movement: Biophilia
- Website: christophermarley.com

Christopher Marley (born 1969) is an artist, photographer, naturalist, and author who uses natural artifacts as his artistic medium. He is best known initially for his book Biophilia, and then for the traveling exhibit Exquisite Creatures that features his art.

== Background ==
Marley was born in Covina, California and raised in Salem, Oregon. Growing up, Marley was a reptile enthusiast. From his earliest memories, Marley was always drawing, and most often his subject was monsters. His father was an aviarist and breeder of rare color mutations of Australian parrots and great blue turacos. Marley served as a missionary in the Atacama Desert in Chile for two years at 19 years old. After this, he studied design at Brigham Young University. During university, he took sabbaticals to work with fashion brands such as Donna Karan, Gucci, Nike, and Giorgio Armani.

== Inspiration ==
Marley long considered insects the "parasites of nature" and his phobia was most triggered by insect legs. To cope with an insect phobia while traveling as a model to exotic places (like South Africa, Borneo, China, and Peru), he collected bugs for exposure therapy.

Marley reflected on the benefits he's gained from interacting with the natural world, and chose to share this realization with others as he noticed bugs as a design medium. In 1998, Marley started to arrange his bug collection using a design and beauty perspective after visiting a mansion in South Africa with nature integrated throughout it. Marley's fiancé convinced him to take early works to boutiques in Beverly Hills, where eight out of initial ten stores he approached wanted to sell his works.

== Artistic medium ==
Book cover for Marley's book Biophilia.

Marley's works feature animals, insects, fossils, minerals, botanicals, bones, and sea life. The animals, minerals, and other animal artifacts featured in his works are typically set in frames with white backgrounds. Marley's work contrasts traditional taxidermy by preserving the entire organism, not just the skin. Animals and insects he has featured in his works include: pythons, venomous reptiles, green mambas, Gaboon vipers, Canebreak rattle snakes, Chrysochus beetles, stag beetles, Delias bufferflies, Eupholus weevils, baby alligators, mustached parakeets, great blue turacos, military macaws, and Boa constrictors.

Marley's artistic philosophy is motivated by aesthetics, telling scientific stories of biological diversity, and focusing on either one or two features in the mosaic for the general public to better receive.

While abiding by local municipalities and their regulations, Marley has developed a network of zoos, aquariums, catchers, lepidopterists, coleopterists, entomologists, and breeders to legally supply him with animal artifacts to be used in his work. Notably, he doesn't buy specimens from hunters, and uses reclaimed specimens that have been caught as fishing bycatch or died by natural causes. He has also developed a novel freeze-drying method to preserve the animals, which contrasts the typical method of preserving animals in liquid. The insects shown in Marley's works are harvested by indigenous communities and sold to help support the local economies.

== Exquisite Creatures exhibition ==
Marley developed a traveling exhibit of his artwork using preserved animal specimens from places such as Tanzania and Cambodia. The exhibit has traveled to museums such as North Carolina Museum of Natural Sciences, Oregon Museum of Science and Industry, and the Los Angeles County Museum of Art.

== Impact ==
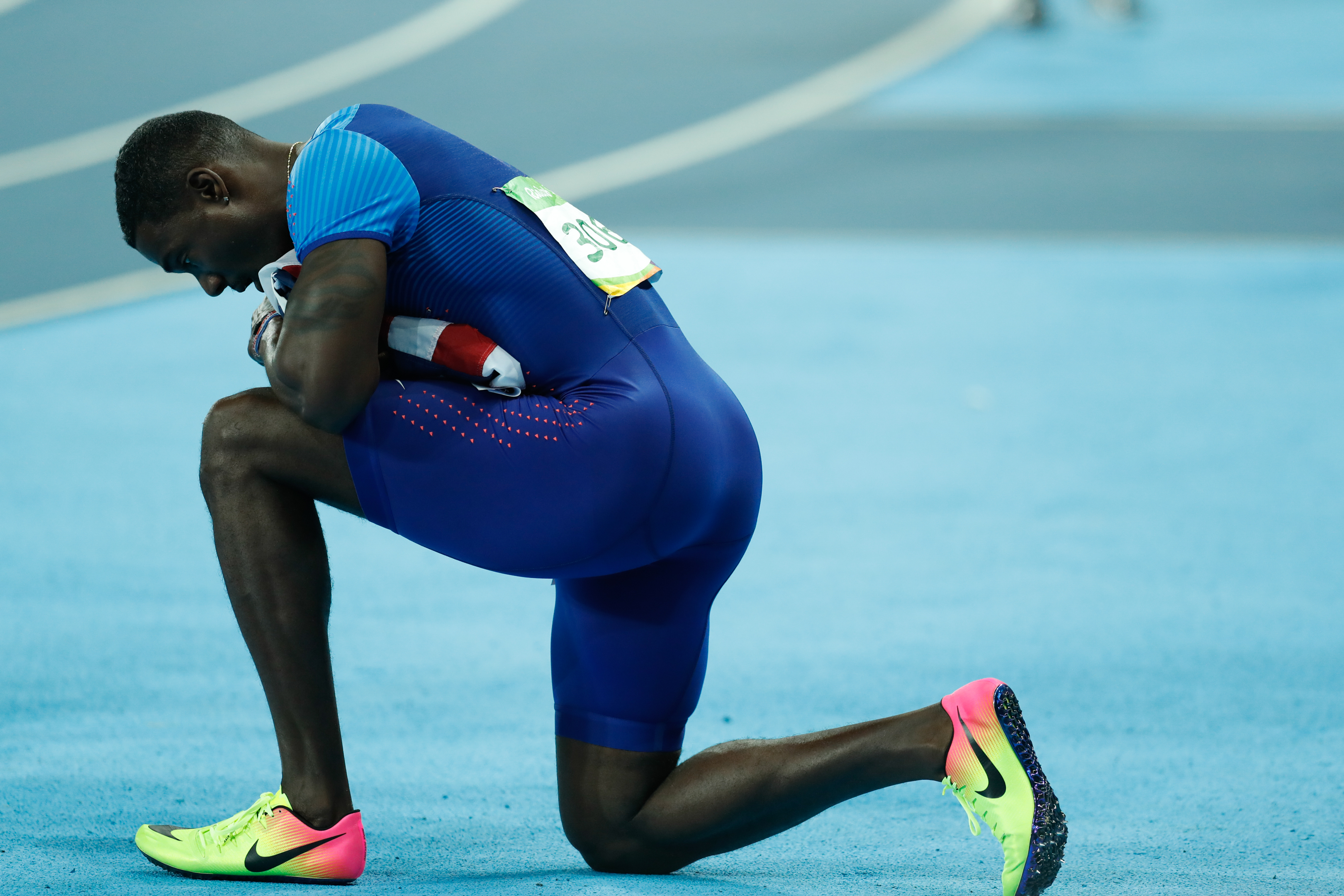
Example of Nike's Zoom Superfly Elite shoes, showcasing the final design during the 2016 Summer Olympics in Rio that were inspired by Christopher Marley's work of the Sagra buqueti beetle.

Alongside its collection of the oldest collection of insects in the new world, the Academy of Natural Sciences of Drexel University has featured Marley's insect work.

For the 2016 Summer Olympics in Rio, former Nike CEO Mark Parker collaborated with Marley to develop an iridescent shoe inspired by Marley's work of the Sagra buqueti beetle.

In September 2017, Marley established Pheromone Asia Studio in Beijing. This allows legal import of insect specimens into China, which was the entity to do so.

Marley's work is also used to inspire youth. A university biology professor at the University of Notre Dame uses Marley's works to inspire his undergraduate biology students.

== Reception ==
Marley's works are generally received with positive reviews. Curator Melanie Johannson of the Cornell Art Museum says, "You’re seeing the beauty of something and appreciating it in a different way than you would if it were alive and it were crawling around". Additionally, a curatorial assistant at the Academy of Natural Sciences of Drexel University's department of entomology shares, "[Marley] has really been an emissary to show how beautiful the natural world is." From a youth perspective, a teacher from a charter school in Portland, Oregon took his students to Marley's Exquisite Creatures exhibit and reports that, "This is the highest level of engagement I've had of any field trip that I've done like this, to museum exhibits, that I've ever done". With regards to influencing product design, former Nike CEO Mark Parker says, "Chris' subject matter and imagery have inspired Nike's design work on color and texture, on high-performance track spikes for Olympic athletes and even new interpretations of classic styles, like the Nike Air Max."

== Personal life ==
Marley currently lives in Salem, Oregon. He has a 10,000-square-foot studio warehouse outside the city of Salem.

== Publications ==
- Marley, Christopher (September 1, 2008). Pheromone: The Insect Artwork of Christopher Marley. Pomegranate Communications. ISBN 978-0764946196.
- Marley, Christopher (April 14, 2015). Biophilia. Harry N. Abrams. ISBN 978-1419715617.
- Marley, Christopher (January 1, 2023). Exquisite Creatures: A Dialogue with Art, Nature, and Science. Christopher Marley Studio. ISBN 979-8986360805.
