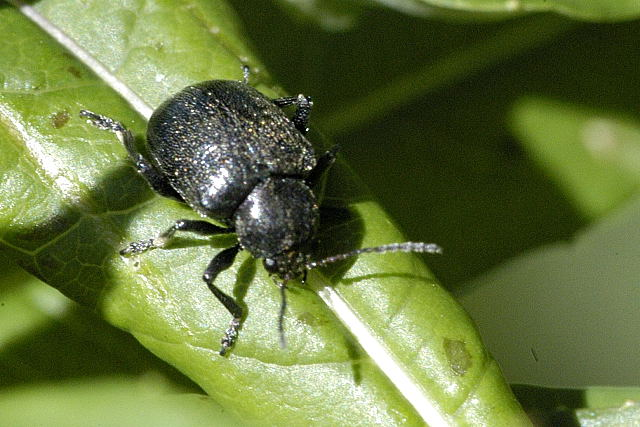

Scientific classification
- Kingdom: Animalia
- Phylum: Arthropoda
- Clade: Pancrustacea
- Class: Insecta
- Order: Coleoptera
- Suborder: Polyphaga
- Infraorder: Cucujiformia
- Family: Chrysomelidae
- Subfamily: Eumolpinae
- Tribe: Bromiini
- Genus: Bromius; Chevrolat in Dejean, 1836
- Species: B. obscurus

Binomial name
- Bromius obscurus (Linnaeus, 1758)

Synonyms
- Genus: Eumolpus Illiger, 1798 (name suppressed); Adoxus Kirby, 1837; Chartonia Gistel, 1856; Species: Chrysomela obscura Linnaeus, 1758; Chrysomela nigroquadrata DeGeer, 1775; Cryptocephalus vitis Fabricius, 1775; Chrysomela villosula Schrank, 1781; Eumolpus obscurus (Linnaeus, 1758); Eumolpus vitis (Fabricius, 1775); Eumolpus cochlearius Say, 1824; Adoxus obscurus (Linnaeus, 1758); Adoxus obscurus var. epilobii Weise, 1882; Adoxus obscurus var. weisei Heyden, 1883; Adoxus obscurus var. concinnus Weise, 1898; Adoxus obscurus var. lewisi Weise, 1898; Adoxus obscurus japonicus Ohno, 1960

= Bromius obscurus =

Bromius obscurus Temporal range: Late Pleistocene–Present

Species of leaf beetle

Bromius obscurus, the western grape rootworm, is a species of beetle in the leaf beetle family. It is the only member of the genus Bromius. The distribution of the species is holarctic; it can be found in North America, wide parts of Europe, and Asia. The species is a known pest of grape vines in Europe and western North America.

== Etymology ==
The genus is named after Bromius, an epithet of the Greek god Dionysus.

== Taxonomic history ==
Bromius obscurus was first described as Chrysomela obscura by Carl Linnaeus in his 1758 10th edition of Systema Naturae. In 1836, the genus Bromius was first established by Louis Alexandre Auguste Chevrolat in Dejean's Catalogue des Coléoptères, including Linnaeus's Chrysomela obscura as well as the species Eumolpus hirtus (now in Trichochrysea) and Cryptocephalus vitis (now a synonym of Bromius obscurus). In 1837, William Kirby established the name Adoxus (derived from the Greek for "inglorious") as a subgenus of Eumolpus, with the species Cryptocephalus vitis as the type. Adoxus was later found to be a synonym of Bromius, though historically some entomologists preferred to use the name Adoxus, since at the time it was thought Chevrolat's name was unavailable.

The generic name Bromius Chevrolat in Dejean, 1836 is a conserved name. It was threatened by Eumolpus in the sense used by Kugelann in Illiger, 1798, which included both Chrysomela obscura and Cryptocephalus vitis. This was because Latreille had designated the latter as the type species of Eumolpus in 1810, placing Bromius as a synonym of Eumolpus. An application to conserve Bromius and other names by suppressing Eumolpus Illiger, 1798 was accepted by the International Commission on Zoological Nomenclature in 2012.

== Description and variations ==
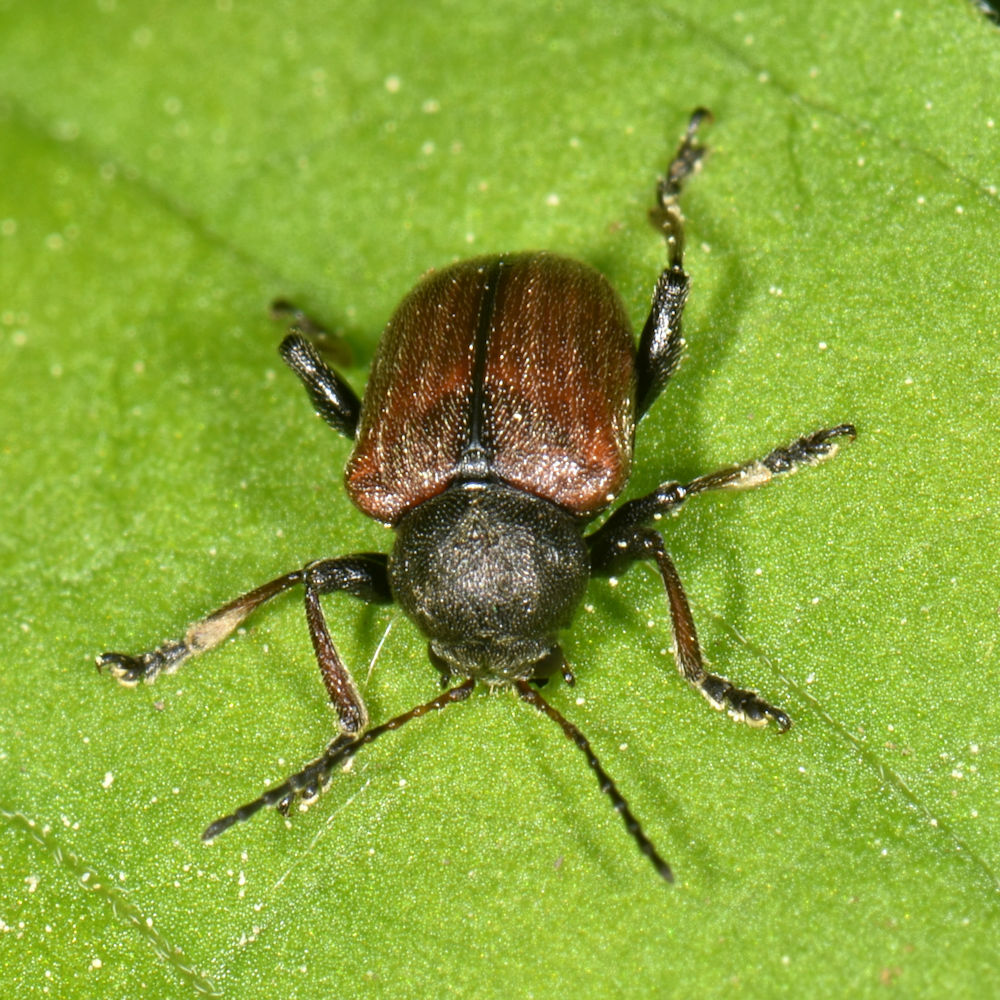
B. obscurus adult with brown elytra and tibiae

Bromius obscurus adults are generally colored black, covered with dull yellow-grey hairs. The elytra and tibiae are either black or reddish-brown. The basal four segments of the antennae are colored orange-red. The species measures 5.0–6.0 mm in body length.

A number of variations of the species have been described:

- Typical form: Elytra black, covered by whitish hairs.
- var. weisei (Heyden, 1883): Elytra black, hairs yellowish, tibiae basally reddish brown.
- var. epilobii (Weise, 1882): Elytra and tibiae brown, hairs whitish.
- var. villosulus (Schrank, 1781): Elytra brown, hairs yellowish.

Historically there was disagreement over whether the obscurus and villosulus variations were in fact two separate species or not, based on morphological differences as well as other factors such as habitat and range of food plants. More recently, authors variously treat them as either variations or separate subspecies of B. obscurus.

The villosulus variation is superficially similar to the species Aoria rufotestacea from Korea. In 2014, it was found that virtually all the Korean specimens of Bromius obscurus were in fact Aoria rufotestacea.

== Distribution ==
B. obscurus is a widespread Holarctic species. In North America, it is distributed across Canada south to North Carolina in the east and California in the west. In Asia, it is one of the few eumolpine species recorded from the north of Siberia.

In the United Kingdom, the B. obscurus was historically known from a single 10 km^{2} square on the Cheshire/Staffordshire border around the Bosley area. However, the species has not been recorded in this area since 1992. According to a report from 2014, it was very recently found from one site in Scotland, which remains the species' only known location in the UK.

== Biology ==
B. obscurus is known to be geographically parthenogenetic: North American populations of the species reproduce sexually, while European populations reproduce asexually and are triploids.

A stridulatory apparatus has been observed on the upper sides of the wings of B. obscurus, the first known in representatives of the subfamily Eumolpinae. It takes a form of a darkened convex microstructure spot near the end of each wing, between the RS and Cu veins.

Symbiotic bacteria are associated with symbiotic organs found in the gut of B. obscurus. In females, the bacteria are also associated with genital accessory organs. Molecular phylogenetic analysis has showed that the bacterial symbiont of B. obscurus belongs to a distinct lineage of the Gammaproteobacteria.

== Fossil record ==
Fossils of B. obscurus have been found in northeastern Russia, dating back to the late Pleistocene.

== Gallery ==
Bromius obscurus on grass in a meadow
