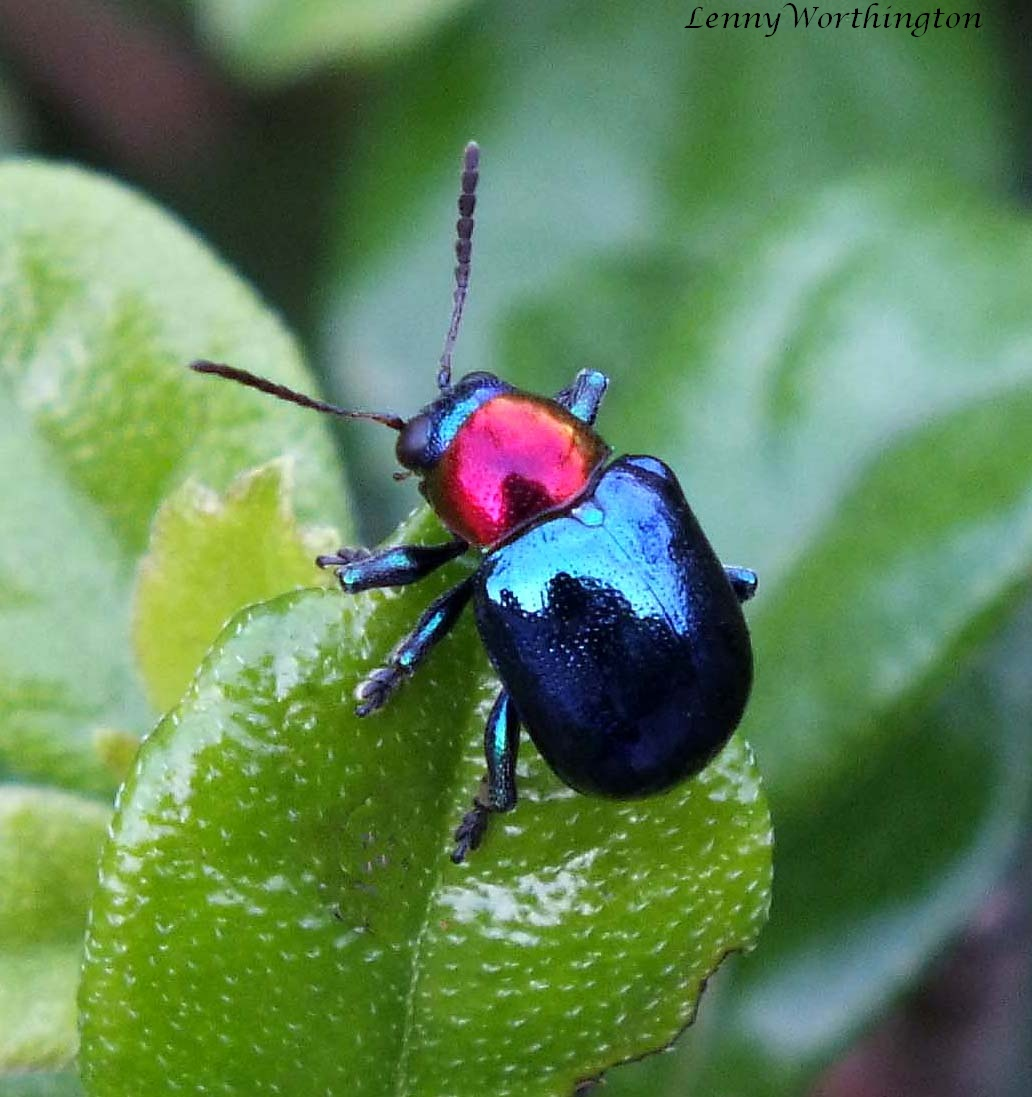
- Parheminodes pulcher, Thailand

Scientific classification
- Kingdom: Animalia
- Phylum: Arthropoda
- Clade: Pancrustacea
- Class: Insecta
- Order: Coleoptera
- Suborder: Polyphaga
- Infraorder: Cucujiformia
- Family: Chrysomelidae
- Subfamily: Eumolpinae
- Tribe: Bromiini
- Genus: Parheminodes; Chen, 1940

Type species
- Parheminodes collaris Chen, 1940

= Parheminodes =

Genus of leaf beetles

Parheminodes is a genus of leaf beetles in the subfamily Eumolpinae. It is distributed in the Oriental realm. In 2021, nearly all species of Chrysochus from the tropics were transferred to this genus.

== Species ==
There are at least seven species included in the genus:

- Parheminodes collaris Chen, 1940 – China (Hainan, Yunnan)
- Parheminodes conspectus (Lefèvre, 1890) – Laos
- Parheminodes hageni (Jacoby, 1884) – Sumatra
- Parheminodes massiei (Lefèvre, 1893) – Laos
- Parheminodes mouhoti (Baly, 1864) – Thailand, Laos, Vietnam
- Parheminodes nilgiriensis (Jacoby, 1908) – South India
- Parheminodes pulcher (Baly, 1864) – Peninsular Malaysia
