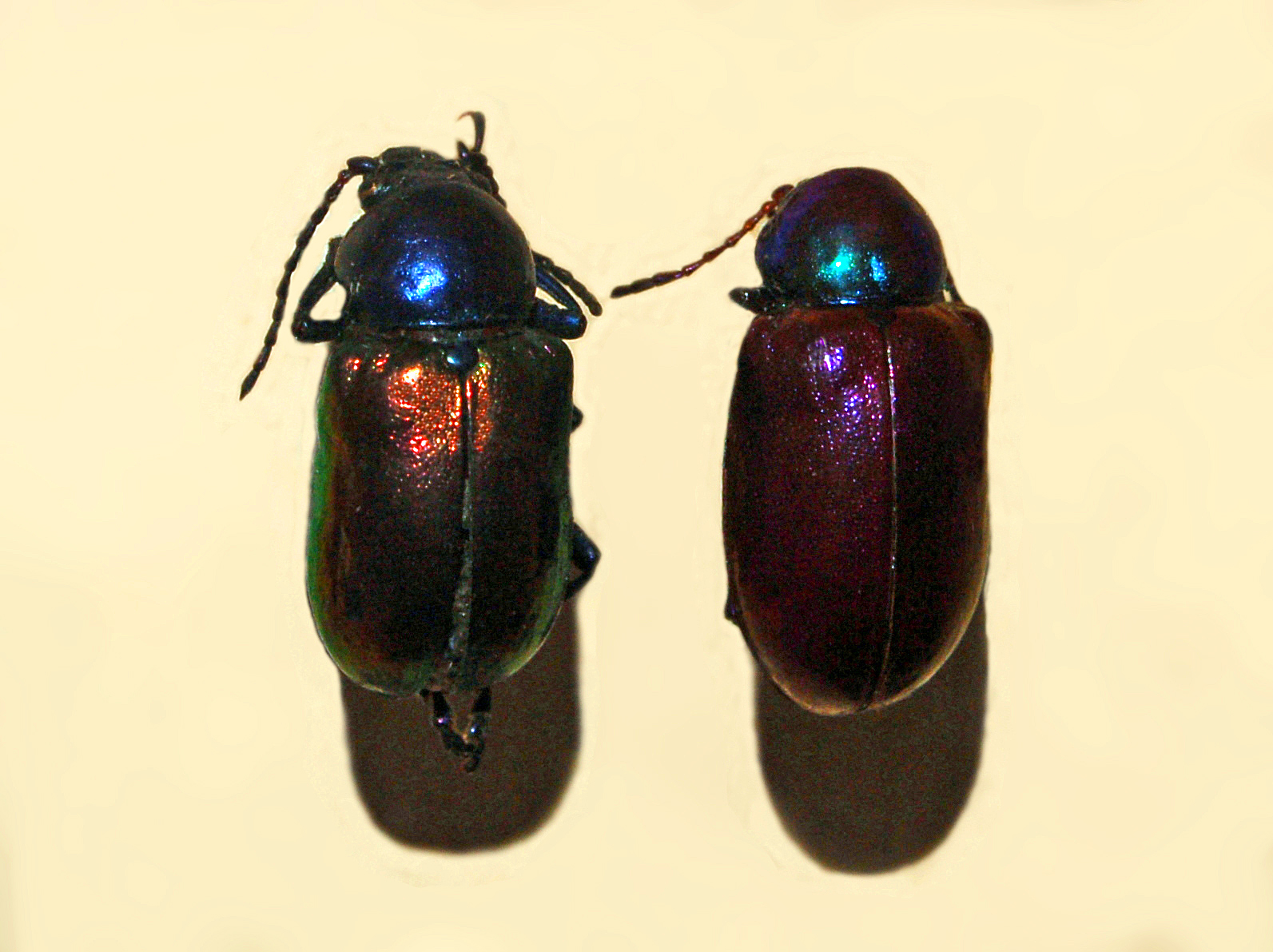
- Chrysochares asiaticus from Russia

Scientific classification
- Kingdom: Animalia
- Phylum: Arthropoda
- Clade: Pancrustacea
- Class: Insecta
- Order: Coleoptera
- Suborder: Polyphaga
- Infraorder: Cucujiformia
- Family: Chrysomelidae
- Subfamily: Eumolpinae
- Tribe: Eumolpini
- Genus: Chrysochares; Morawitz, 1861

Type species
- Chrysomela asiatica Pallas, 1771

= Chrysochares =

Genus of leaf beetles

Chrysochares is a genus of leaf beetles in the subfamily Eumolpinae. It is found in Europe and Asia.

== Species ==
- Chrysochares asiaticus (Pallas, 1771)
- Chrysochares punctatus (Gebler, 1845)
  - Chrysochares punctatus constricticollis Lopatin, 1963
  - Chrysochares punctatus punctatus (Gebler, 1845)
