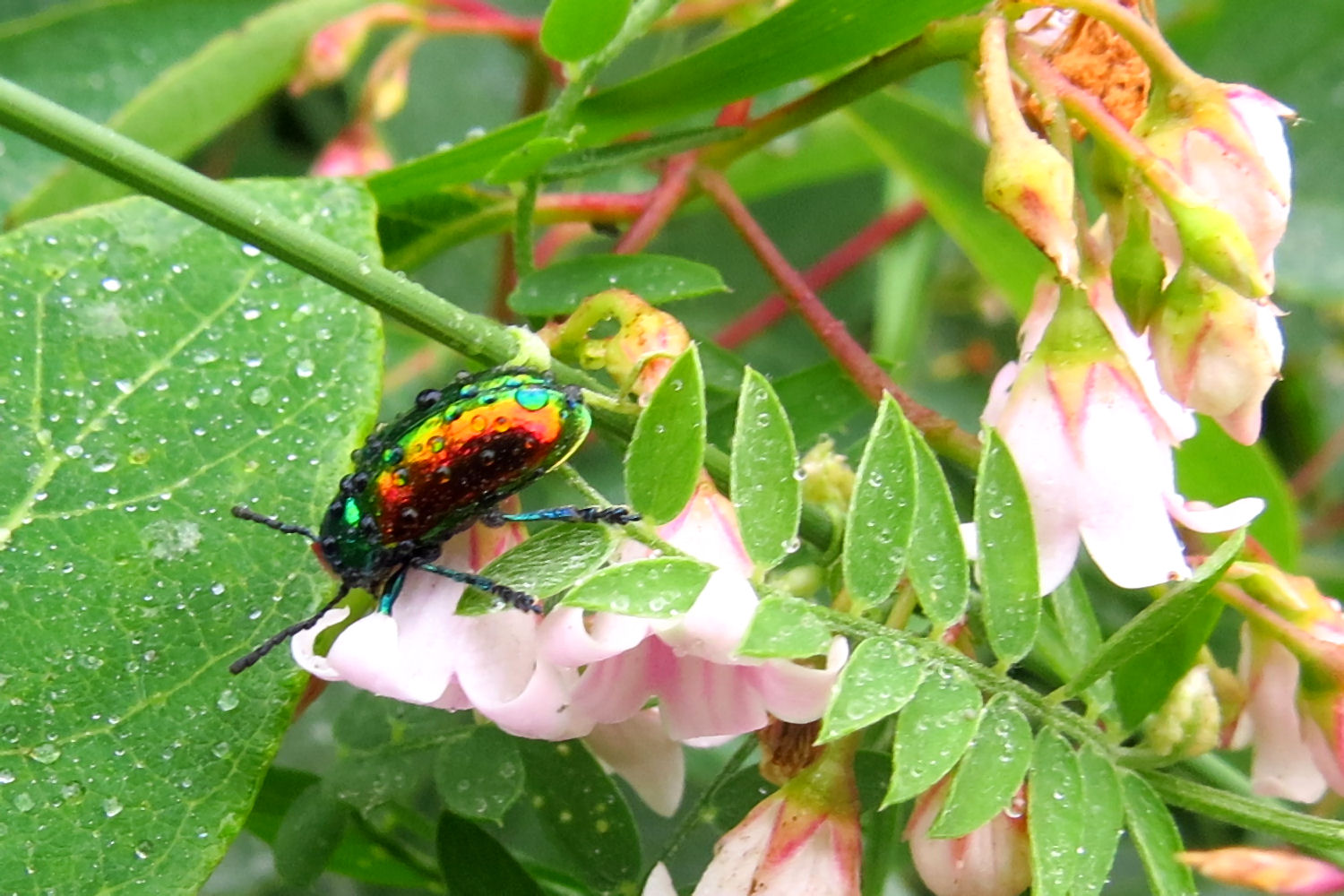

Scientific classification
- Kingdom: Animalia
- Phylum: Arthropoda
- Class: Insecta
- Order: Coleoptera
- Suborder: Polyphaga
- Infraorder: Cucujiformia
- Family: Chrysomelidae
- Subfamily: Eumolpinae
- Tribe: Eumolpini
- Genus: Chrysochus
- Species: C. auratus

Binomial name
- Chrysochus auratus (Fabricius, 1775)

Synonyms
- Chrysomela aurata Fabricius, 1775

= Chrysochus auratus =

Dogbane beetle

Species of beetle

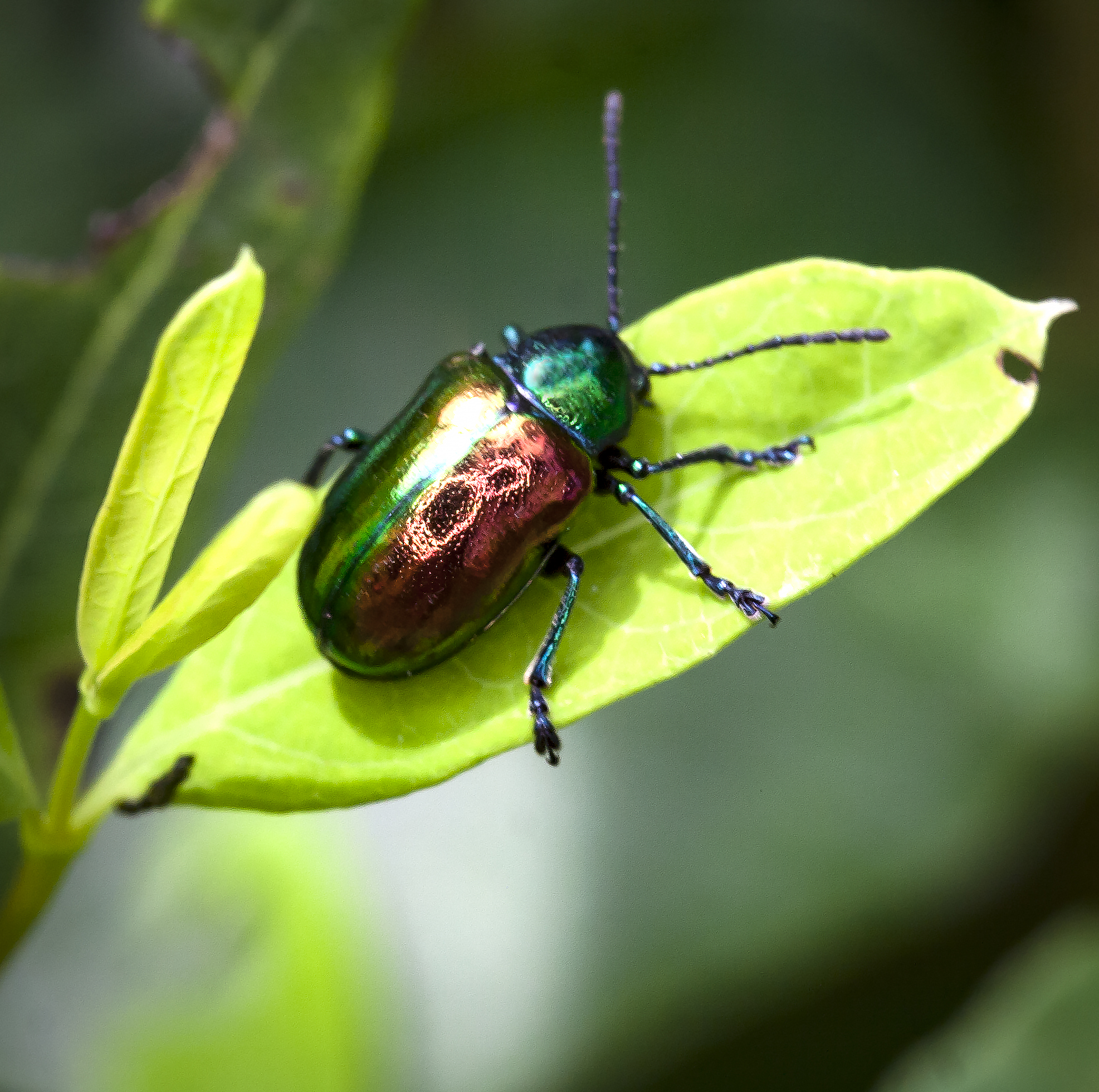
dog bane beetle (Chrysochus auratus)

Chrysochus auratus, more commonly known as the dogbane beetle, is a leaf beetle primarily found in the eastern United States and Canada. The beetle is approximately 8 to 11 mm in length, and possesses an oblong and convex shape. This beetle has two pairs of wings, one of which is a pair of copper colored elytra. The beetle is typically found to have a blue-green hue, and its color is often used to ward away potential predators.

A major aspect of this beetles' day to day life is sexual reproduction, as the beetles typically live a highly polygamous lifestyle. This beetle has also been found to participate in interbreeding with Chrysochus cobaltinus in certain geographic regions, resulting in hybrid offspring. Its diet consists primarily of dogbane (Apocynum), specifically Apocynum cannabinum and Apocynum androsaemifolium. C. auratus has developed several different adaptations that allow it to eat dogbane, such as its ability to process the toxins in dogbane leaves. Due to its diet of exclusively dogbane, C. auratus has been considered as a potential mechanism of biological control for agricultural purposes.

== Geographic range ==
Chrysochus auratus is generally found in eastern North America, spanning the entire eastern United States and into adjacent southern Canada west of the Rocky Mountains. At the western edge of its range, it extends west of the Rocky Mountains into Arizona and Utah. The related species Chrysochus cobaltinus, in contrast, is found exclusively in western North America. The two species were historically considered to have allopatric distributions. Recently, at least two narrow regions in western North America have been documented where both C. auratus and C. cobaltinus occur and apparently interbreed.

== Food resources ==
Beetles of the Chrysochus genus typically feed on various dogbane plants (Apocynaceae), including milkweeds (Asclepiadoideae). It has been found that C. auratus exclusively feeds on non-milkweed dogbane plants. More specifically, C. auratus feeds on the Apocynum cannabinum and Apocynum androsaemifolium dogbane varieties. Larvae of the dogbane beetle will typically feed on the roots of the plants while adults will feed on the leaves of the plants. Plants in the Apocynum genus release toxins, called cardenolides, as a defense mechanism to predators. When ingested, it can be fatal for numerous organisms, including humans as consumption can result in cardiac arrest. Because C. auratus feed exclusively on Apocynum cannabinum and Apocynum androsaemifolium; they have developed behavioral and physiological adaptations to overcome these plant's defenses.

Cardenolides have the ability to bind to and block the function of Na^{+}/K^{+} - ATPase, which is a transmembrane carrier present in almost all animals and tissues. It controls the balance of cell potentials and is vital to the nervous system. When poisoned, these systems are detrimentally affected. Therefore, this type of beetle has adapted mechanisms to reduce the effects cardenolides has on Na^{+}/K^{+} - ATPase in C. auratus. More specifically, Chrysochus auratus has a single amino acid substitution in its Na^{+}/K^{+} - ATPase that allows it to achieve this. The beetle is not only adapted to processing toxic cardenolide, but can also able to accumulate this compound in its own body to deter future predators. Cardenolide is shuttled through the beetle's body into cuticular glands, some of which are located in the elytra or wings. When the beetle senses some form of disturbance that requires a defensive mechanism, the beetle will secrete the cardenolides, poisoning its enemies. This mutation may explain the dogbane beetle's insensitivity to the poisonous compounds, especially because this same mutation has been shown in the cardenolide-insensitive monarch butterfly.

These beetles have also evolved to develop a behavioral mechanism that allows for feeding on the Apocynum genus. As a defense mechanism to predators, Apocynum cannabinum and Apocynum androsaemifolium (dogbane) produce a toxic sticky white latex when its stems and leaves are broken. When feeding, C. auratus beetles feed on the margins of A. cannabinum and A. androsaemifolium leaves. The beetle will chew a five-to-seven-millimeter channel that sits diagonal from the leaf margin and points in the direction of the leaf's apex. Because this channel transects the major veins of the leaf, these initial cuts will exude a large amount of latex the leaf releases as its defensive mechanism. Distal to this initial cut location is the presence of low-latex tissue, which the beetle exclusively feeds on, biting on it in a downward motion. The feeding process typically lasts around one minute, and the beetle will straddle the leaf margins while feeding. As the beetles feed, latex accumulates on the ventral segments of their mouth due to the repetitive downward motion made by their head. Therefore, after feeding has ceased, the beetles will move from the margins of the leaf to the interior portion of the leaf. The beetle will then press its mouth to the surface of the leaf and drag its mouth on the leaf while walking backwards. This method removes the latex buildup from the beetle's mouth region. Evidence of this behavior can be seen on leaves that have been fed on by C. auratus, demonstrated by the rings of dried latex that can be found near the site of feeding.

== Parental care ==
No parental care has been reported, except the fecal sac that the mother surrounds her eggs with when attaching them to the underside of the dogbane leaf.

=== Oviposition ===
Copulation typically occurs on the Apocynum plant, and after mating, females lay eggs on the underside of the leaves of the host plant and surrounding vegetation.

== Life history ==
=== Life cycle ===
After hatching from the egg in midsummer, the first instar larvae will drop to the ground and burrow into the soil. There, it will feed on tuberous rhizomes of the Apcoynum plants. Since Apocynum contains cardenolides that are very toxic to most animals, the ability of larvae to eat the plant prevents it from being preyed on by parasitic wasps. Soon after, the larvae will then pupate in a chamber in the same soil, and virgin adults remain in these chambers until they are ready to emerge. Adults will choose to come out of the chamber when their bodies have sufficiently hardened. This usually takes place in the early summer, and the adult beetle will stay in the host plant patch for the next six to eight weeks. Dogbane beetles typically produce one generation per year.

== Genetics ==
Both Chrysochus auratus and Chrysochus coblatinus are considered to have allopatric distributions. C. auratus has an eastern North American distribution, occupying eastern North America to the west of the Rocky Mountains. C. cobaltinus is exclusively found in western North America. In western North America, there are two regions where the distribution of these two species is sympatric, and there are four additional regions in which the two species are less than 100 km apart. In some of these areas of sympatry, there are areas, coined as "hybrid zones" where the two species participate in interbreeding. One such hybrid zone is located in the low-lying area of the Yakima River valley in Washington state where there is a 75 km wide region where C. auratus and C. cobaltinus interact. Evidence has indicated that this hybrid zone is of post-Pleistocene origin. During the late Pleitocene, central Washington and the Yakima River Valley faced flooding from Glacial Lake Missoula. The current geographical distribution of the C. auratus suggests that after the Pleistocene glaciers receded, the population began to expand into south central Washington, resulting in this hybrid zone. In these areas, hybridization is frequent, but hybrid offspring of the two species have low fitness. Therefore, while hybridization is relatively common, positive assortative mating also has been found to occur.

In many cases, the hybrid offspring will be more genetically similar to one parent compared to the other. It has been found that when this is the case, the hybrid is often more similar to C. auratus. Hybrid males are also more likely to cluster with C. auratus beetles over C. cobaltinus beetles, and the same applies for hybrid females. If a hybrid female clusters with C. cobaltnius, the cluster likely also contains C. Cobaltinus males, C. auratus males, and hybrid males. Because the hybrids have lowered fitness and are usually sterile, C. auratus and C. cobaltinus ideally want to mate with beetles within their own respective species. However, in hybrid zones where there is a mix of purebred and hybrid beetles, it can be difficult to make distinctions when a male is trying to choose a female mate. Studies have shown that C. cobaltinus males are able to make distinctions between C. cobaltinus and C. auratus females, even in hybrid zones.

== Mating ==
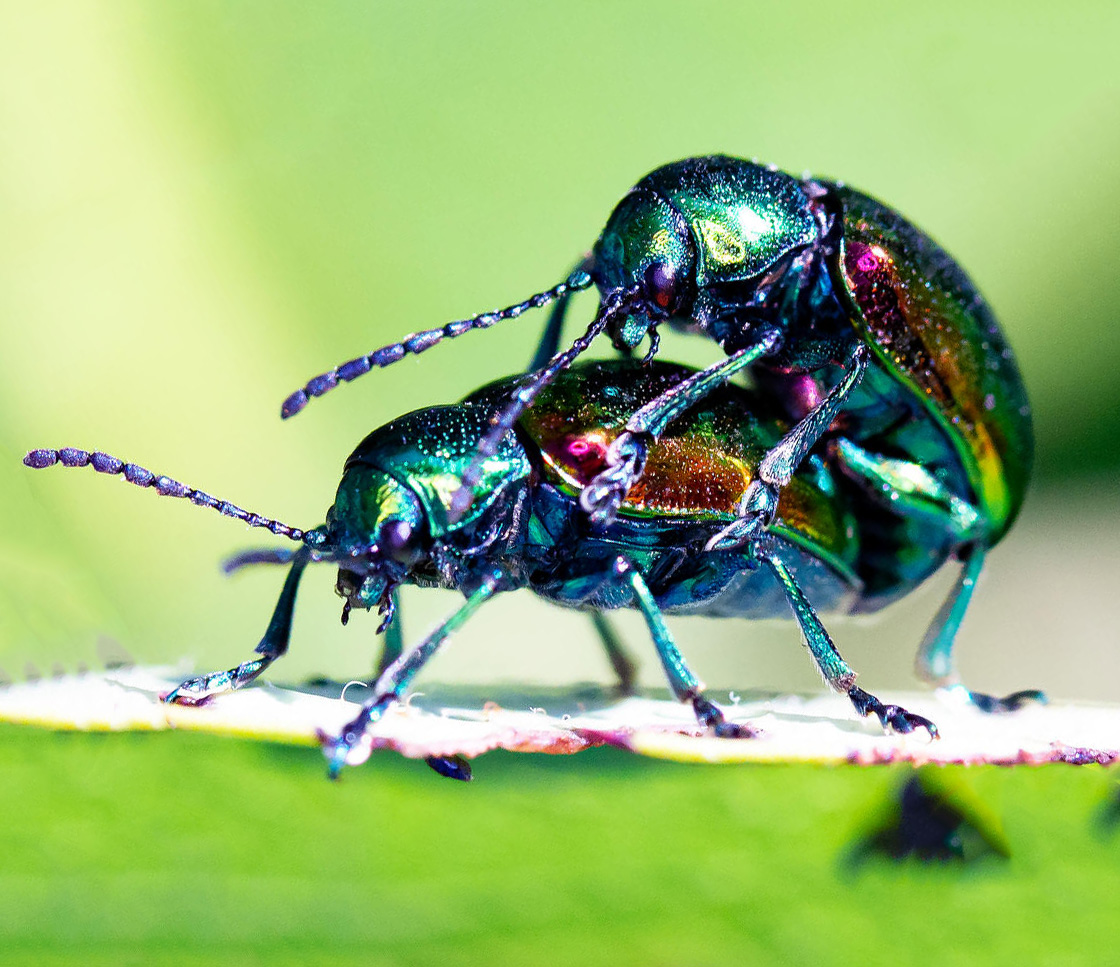
Coupled dogbane beetles

=== Mate searching behavior ===
In this species, males will select the evolutionarily fittest females to mate with. The way in which a male chooses a female to mate with is via chemical signaling systems. Dogbane beetles use sex pheromones known as cuticular hydrocarbon signals to find which females are the fittest and which are not going to increase their direct fitness through procreation.

=== Female/male interactions ===
==== Copulation ====
Adult male and female dogbane beetles usually copulate every day, about once each day. They are also known to be polygamous, and procreating often increases fecundity, and in turn fitness. When the male has found a suitable mate, copulation begins. Copulation tends to occur earlier in the day and usually takes from an hour to an hour and a half, because the male perches himself on the female's back after insemination to make sure his sperm fertilizes her eggs and to keep other males away from the female.

== Physiology ==
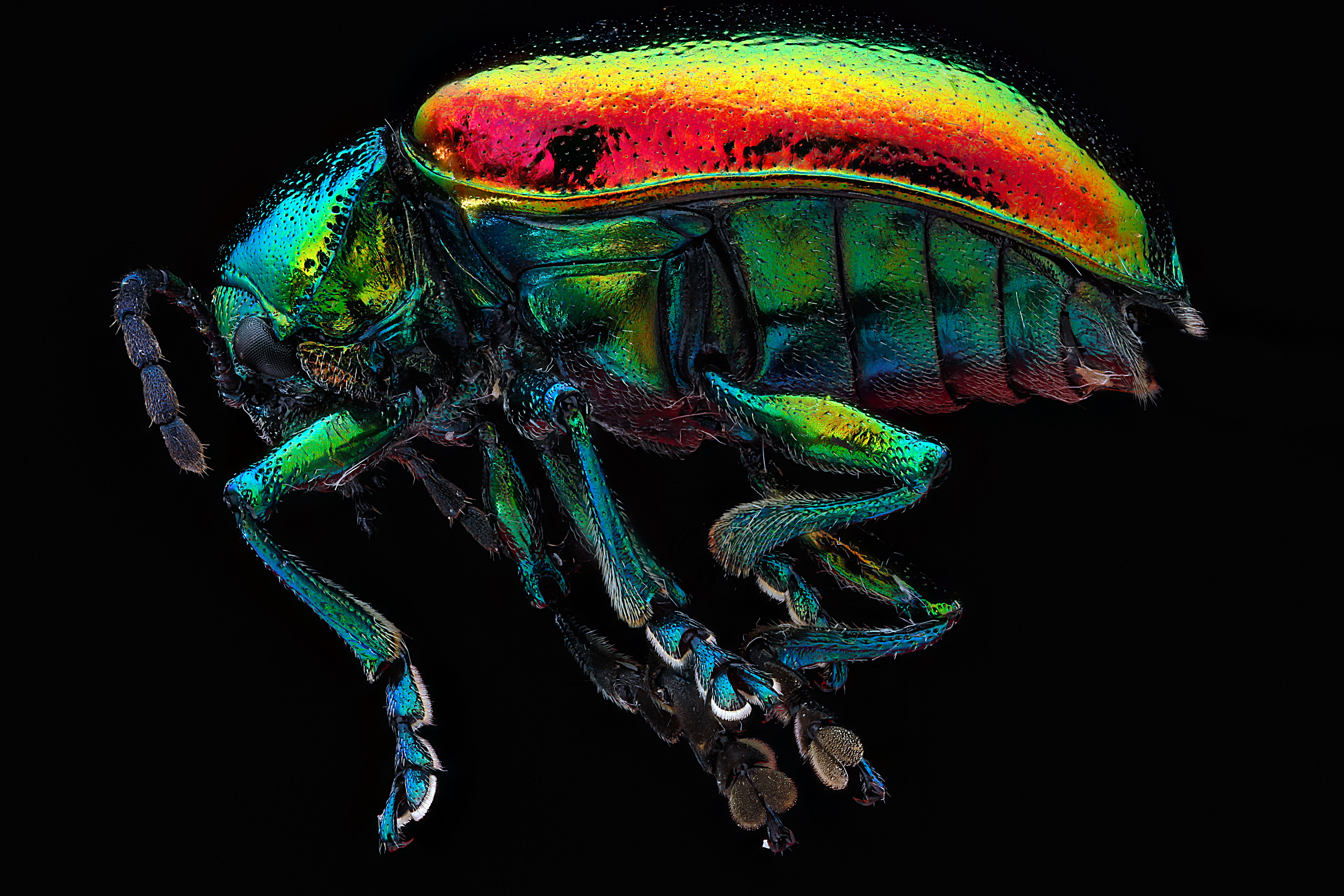
The elytra and shell of Chrysochus auratus have a distinct color.

Adult dogbane beetles are typically an iridescent blue-green color, an appearance that plays to their advantage as it wards off predators. The beetle is typically eight to eleven millimeters in length with an oblong and convex shape. It has a bluish black undersurface. The beetle possesses a pair of antennae that are long and twelve joined. They are located between the eye and frontal ridge of the head and are widely separated at their base.

The Chrysochus auratus is divided into three large divisions: head, thorax, and abdomen. It shares this external anatomy with most other insects. Its hind two pairs of legs are attached to the thorax, and it has a highly chitinized body. The head and thorax have deep punctures intermingled with smaller punctures all throughout. This beetle also has a blunt mandible, characteristics of its herbivorous diet. It has a longer left mandible than the right side which fits into an indentation in the left mandible. This species of beetle has also adapted to have a large hypopharynx, which allows it to lap up juices from the plants on which it preys.

=== Flight ===
Attached to its thorax, C. auratus beetles possess two pairs of wings. The first pair of wings or elytra are heavily chitinized and are not used for flight. Their main purpose is to protect the more fragile hind wings. The elytra also form the hard case of the beetle, covering its entire dorsal surface and giving it its coppery tinge. The elytra, similar to the head and thorax, contains punctures, but they are smaller and more irregular compared to other parts of the body. The second pair of wings is primarily used for flight and is membranous in texture. While C. auratus do not migrate, they do use their wings to fly between plants in their host patch. The wings have complex venation that vary between beetles. When the wings are folded, certain portions of the wing will reverse.

== Interactions with humans and livestock ==
=== Agricultural use ===
Apocynum is a native perennial weed that affects lowbush blueberries. The sprouting portion of the plant interferes with blueberry growth and harvest by casting shadows on the blueberry plants. Additionally, dogbane leaves contain latex sap that can potentially poison blueberries. Controlling the spread of this dogbane is difficult, as there are only few effective herbicides, many of which harm the blueberry plant as well. Due to C. auratus' use of Apocynum (dogbane) as a food source, the beetle has been considered as a potential mechanism of biological control for Apocynum. Research on this topic has consistently shown that while an inundation of C. auratus could significantly deter dogbane growth and spreading, natural population densities of the beetle would not cause enough of an effect to single handedly control the Apocynum populations. Therefore, many integrated management programs for dogbane proliferation are working on strategies to conserve and augment the C. auratus population for agricultural use.

C. auratus has also been considered as a potential mechanism of biological control for a non-native European vine called Vincetoxicum rossicum, which also falls in the Apocynaceae family. However, experiments have shown that while C. auratus is very reproductively successful on Apocynum cannabinum and Apocynum androsaemifolium leaves, this success does not apply to Vincetoxicum rossicum. This beetle lays its eggs on the underside of leaves, and experiments have shown that Vincetoxicum rossicum leaves are an oviposition sink for C. auratus eggs, meaning that depositing eggs on the underside of these leaves can result in a lower probability of successful development and survival for their larvae. Therefore, C. auratus may not necessarily be as successful an avenue for Vincetoxicum rossicum control as for other Apocynaceae plants.
