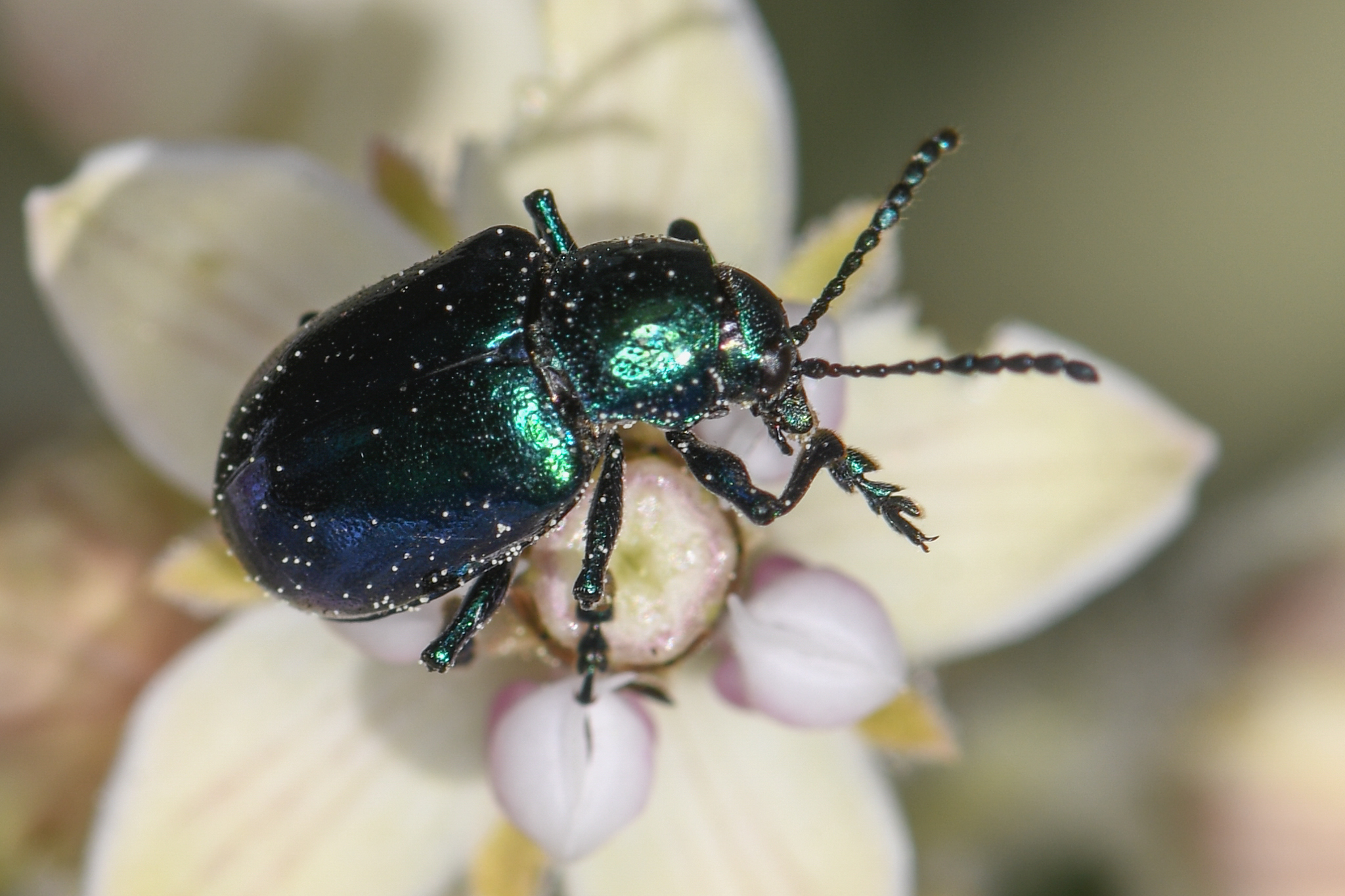

Scientific classification
- Kingdom: Animalia
- Phylum: Arthropoda
- Class: Insecta
- Order: Coleoptera
- Suborder: Polyphaga
- Infraorder: Cucujiformia
- Family: Chrysomelidae
- Genus: Chrysochus
- Species: C. cobaltinus

Binomial name
- Chrysochus cobaltinus LeConte, 1857

Synonyms
- Chrysochus castaneus Marshall, 1865; Chrysochus californicus Marshall, 1865; Chrysochus tenebricosus Marshall, 1865

= Chrysochus cobaltinus =

Species of beetle

Chrysochus cobaltinus, the cobalt milkweed beetle or blue milkweed beetle, is a member of the diverse family of leaf beetles, Chrysomelidae. It is named after its cobalt-blue exoskeleton, which makes it easy to spot and distinguish, and its tendency to feed off milkweed plants. It occurs in the Western United States and British Columbia.

These beetles use dogbane and milkweed plant species as their primary source of food. Both these plants contain toxic molecules known as cardenolides. C. cobaltinus beetles are resistant to cardenolide toxic effects and can further use them for their own protection against predators. By storing them in pronotal and elytra glands, they can utilize these toxins to their advantage and evolutionary benefit.

These beetles participate in polygamous matings in which both female and male beetles mate with multiple partners. Females can particularly mate with three male beetles simultaneously. After the mating has occurred, males tend to stay mounted on the female's back for an average of 1.7 hours. This postcopulatory behavior has been attributed to increase the male's chance of producing his offspring with his paternal genes. It has been shown to prevent females from mating with other males (while the original male remains on her back) until the male removes himself.

C. cobaltinus beetles have also been shown to partake in hybrid mating between its species and C. auratus (a sister species). In hybrid zones, both beetles live in close proximity which has led to introgression between these two species.

== Appearance ==
C. cobaltinus has an iridescent cobalt-blue exoskeleton. Both sexes range from 6–9 millimetres (0.24–0.35 in) in length, with clubbed antennae. The elytra usually have more or less evident epipleura, changing within the varying species within the Chrysomelidae. It rarely has an exposed pygidium. The body is oval, although the ventral is not prominently convex.

== Behavior ==
C. cobaltinus is similar to click beetles in being able to launch themselves a couple times the length of their body.

=== Diet ===
Both adults and larvae feed on dogbane (Apocynum) and milkweed (Asclepias) species. Adults typically feed on the foliage and flowers of the newly developed plant. When a large community appears, they consume a large portion of the leaf tissue from the plant, which causes significant damage to the plant. The adults eat holes in the leaves of the host plant, appearing in spring as the days become warmer and the plant's leaves begin to develop. During the spring, they disperse in large numbers on various plants within the same area of distribution.

A closely related species, C. auratus, has been shown to have a similar yet different diet. The two Chrysochus species were shown to have different feeding habits in which C. auratus feed exclusively on Apocynum cannabinum and Apocynum androsaemifolium whereas C. cobaltinus has a broader diet as shown above.

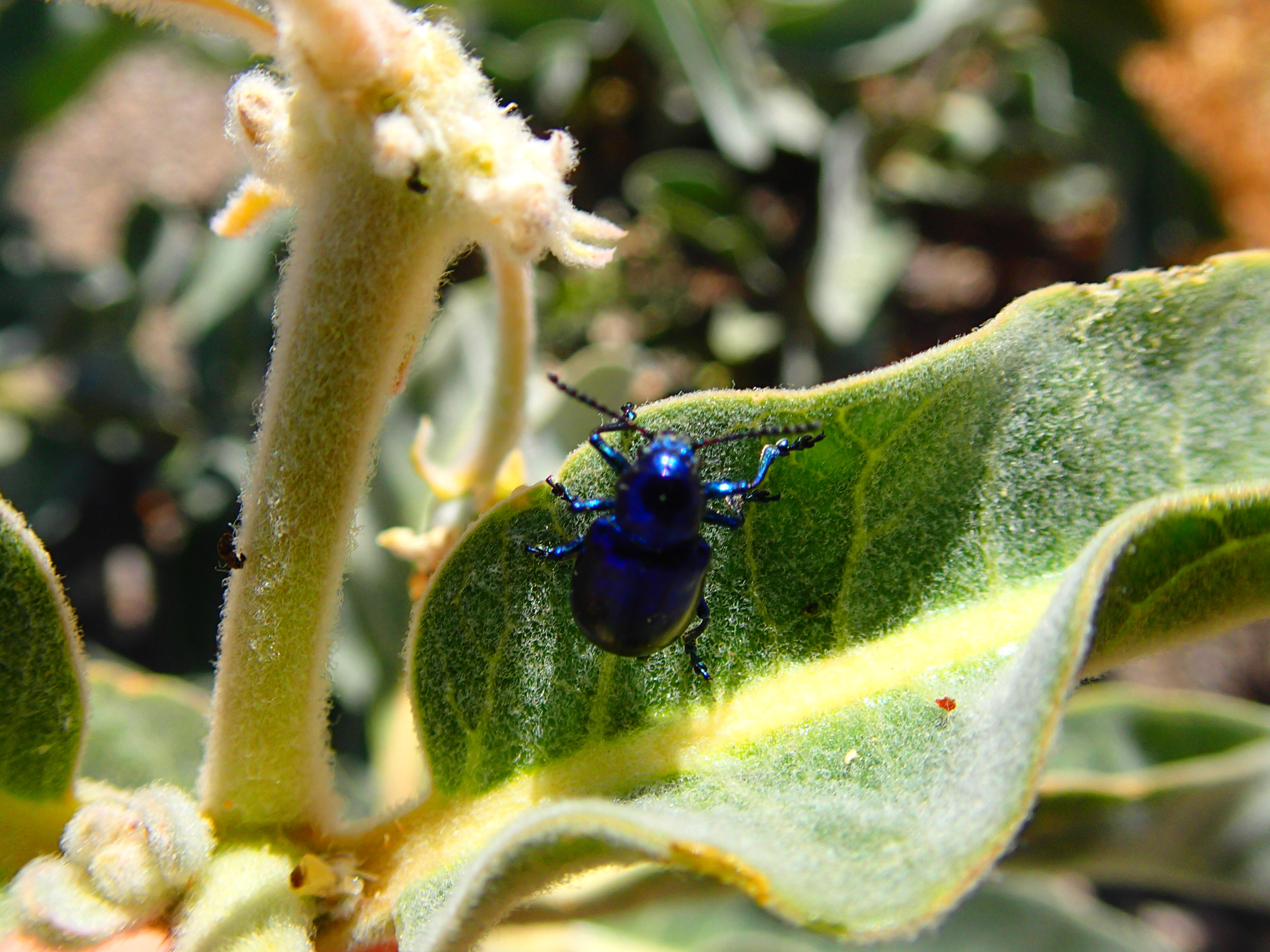
A cobalt milkweed beetle eating through the Apocynum leaf.

Both of these plants are known producers of cardenolides which are toxic glycoside molecules. Most species cannot survive after ingesting these highly toxic molecules. These molecules can quickly bind and block the Na+/K+-ATPase proteins. These are proteins found in our cells which are essential for animal/human life. Blocking these proteins can be fatal for any organism. But C. cobaltinus and C. auratus have evolved to adapt to these cardenolide molecules and avoid its toxic effects. This adaptability has been theorized to come through a mutation shared in both C. cobaltinus and C. auratus. Sequencing studies found a single mutation in the alpha-subunit of the Na+/K+-ATPase proteins that seem to confer cardenolide-resistance. The mutation (found at amino acid position 122) is a switch from asparagine to histidine which has made it so that the toxic molecules can no longer bind and inhibit the ATPase protein. Through this substitution, these beetles have evolutionarily adapted to utilize an otherwise toxic plant for its benefit. Further, C. cobaltinus has evolved to use these toxic molecules for its own benefit and defense against predators (See protective behavior section).

== Predators ==
C. cobaltinus beetles have established defensive behaviors in which they release toxic secretions from their pronotal and elytral glands. The pronotal is a protective hard shell that encompasses the beetle's thorax region; the elytral are the beetle's wings that rest on its side. When threatened, these beetles will begin to release small excretions through both of these glands. These secretions have been found to include the toxic cardenolide molecules. These cardenolides are the same toxins found in the Asclepias and Apocynum plants that make up the beetles' primary source of food. These molecules, though not toxic to C. cobaltinus, can fatally affect other organisms—including possible predators. These beetles have adapted resistance to cardenolide toxic effects and can further ingest these molecules. But besides digesting them, these beetles have found ways to incorporate them in defensive behaviors against predators. Studies found that C. cobaltinus (and C. auratus) have developed mechanisms to sequester these cardenolides in their pronotal and elytral glands; there, these molecules are stored to be released in the case of danger. The overall cardenolide concentration inside the bodies will remain low. But, if a predator threatens the beetle's survival, it can release small secretions that contain a high concentration of the cardenolides. It is an effective and resourceful strategy as other organisms cannot tolerate the toxin.

== Mating ==
C. cobaltinus beetles take part in polygamous mating which allows the species to increase genetic diversity and propagations. Polygamous mating means both female and male beetles will mate with multiple members of the opposite sex; most adults average one mating per day. Some beetles will re-mate with former partners multiple times throughout the day. In fact, females can even carry up to three male beetles on her back at once. This can encourage competition. often, males will engage in competitions to fight for a spot with the female.

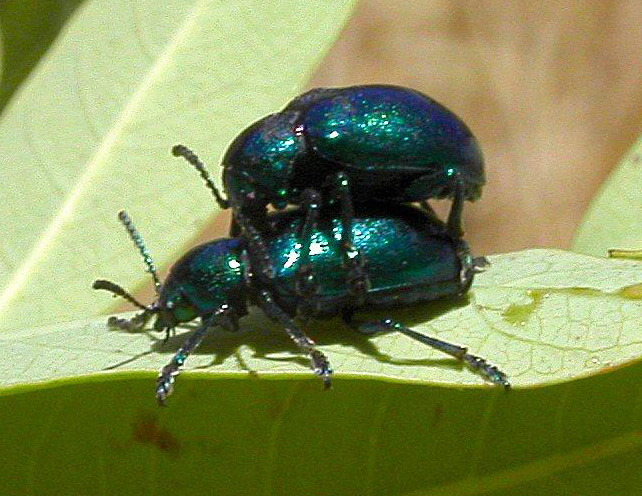
Chrysochus cobaltinus beetles engage in copulatory behavior.

When these beetles decide to copulate, the male beetle will approach the female beetle and mount her from the rear. Female beetles have been observed to lower their abdomen in efforts to reject the male's behavior; but this action is largely ineffective, and the male can continue to attempt mounting the female until the male is successful. The male beetle rides on the female's back for a period lasting no longer than 20 minutes. Afterwards, the male beetles will remain stationary on the female's back for a prolonged period. This period lasts for an average of 1.7 hours and has been theorized to occur for the male beetle's evolutionary benefit. By remaining on the female's back after copulating, the male is able to increase and protect the chance of his paternity. If the male remains on the female's back, he is able to guard and repel other males from mating the female. It also prevents females from re-mating with other male beetles; though, it does not affect the female's mobility as she can still use her legs to walk around with the male on her back. Overall, all of these benefits increase the male's chance of propagating his genetics to the female's offspring. This period of postcopulatory riding can also mutually benefit both female and male beetles as it offers some protection against predators. Possible effects of postcopulatory riding include predator confusion, the selfish herd effect, or doubled defenses against predators. Through these, the beetles seem to increase their average lifespan because of the protection against predators or other threats to the beetle's survival.

There is also a proposed male cost to postcopulatory behavior. By staying attached to the female, the male is sacrificing the opportunity to be mating other females. As the period can last up to 1.7 hours, the male is losing valuable time he could be copulating with other mates. The male is also losing energy/resources to stay on the female's back for such a long period of time; this time could be used to gather food, regenerate sperm, and court other females. However, the benefit of postcopulatory riding (of increased paternity assurance) outweighs this cost.

The female cost and benefit of polyandry exists as well. Polyandry has been positively correlated with an increase in female lifetime fecundity. Studies found that females that mate with multiple partners resultingly have an increase in the number of daily eggs produced. Additionally, females that mate with more partners are more likely to begin oviposition sooner than those who mate with less.

=== Hybrid mating ===
C. cobaltinus and C. auratus share a strip of land in the state of Washington in which both species are heavily present. Since these two beetles are phylogenetically similar and closely related, hybrid mating between the two species has been observed. Up to 15% of the offspring in these areas are F1 hybrids. Hybrid mating brings up the possibility of introgression which is the transfer of genetic information from one species to another as a result of hybridization. Then, the genes can further return to the original species through backcrossing. Therefore, many of these hybrids are easy to identify since they have intermediate color and antennal morphology to C. auratus and C. cobaltinus. Most of these F1 hybrid offspring are produced by C. cobaltinus female beetles and not C. auratus. Regardless, we continue to see heterospecific matings between both species.

Hybrid mating does not affect the beetles' length of copulation. It also has no effect on the female beetles' lifespan or larval production size. Generally, hybrid mating does not have any evolutionary benefit. In fact, the F1 hybrids have been observed to have low fitness and propagation. F1 female hybrids are sterile and cannot reproduce. This has prevented the F1 generation from growing and converging both species; it is a proof of natural selection against hybridization. Even without an evolutionary benefit to either species, hybrid mating still occurs most probably because they are so closely located near one another.

Female beetles prefer conspecific mating partners, but this is an insignificant factor. The male's mating preference shows to take precedence. This is due to the fact that male beetles can continuously attempt to mount a female beetle until the male is successful. C. cobaltinus male beetles have been shown to respond to cuticular hydrocarbon (CHC) profiles around them. CHCs are chemical signals (or pheromones) excreted by the female beetles. These signals communicate between the female and male during mating processes. They can also indicate the female beetle's virgin-status to the males—as this may affect mate choice but has not been studied. Additionally, these profiles are both sex-specific and species-specific. In the setting of hybrid matings, CHCs were hypothesized to affect C. cobaltinus male's preference to mate with conspecific females rather than heterospecific females. Male beetles were shown to have the ability to identify between these different species CHC profiles. But it remains unclear whether this is the only factor in driving C. cobaltinus male preference against hybrid mating. C. cobaltinus and C. auratus have been shown to have similar CHC profiles due to their high phylogenetic similarity.

In the hybridizing C. cobaltinus and C. auratus, the effects of heterospecific mating impacted the two species differently. In C. auratus, the females had low F1 production in heterospecific mating frequencies (up to 70%). The fitness benefits from heterospecific mating was not apparent because C. auratus females that mate with both species have the same number of conspecific offspring as C. auratus females who mate with a conspecific male. On the other hand, C. cobaltinus females' F1 hybrid offspring production was proportional to heterospecific mating frequency.

Post-zygotic barriers exist in hybrid zones. For example, F1 hybrid offspring are often sterile. Furthermore, C. cobaltinus seem to suffer more from F1 hybrids, which includes developmental problems in young. As a result of such implications, C. cobaltinus males in the hybrid zone avoid heterospecific mating compared to non hybrid zone males. Hybrid zone males also have the ability to detect conspecific and heterospecific females based on hydrocarbons. Since C. cobaltinus females faced the most costs from heterospecific matings, females should evolve enhanced prezygotic barriers.

In a hybrid zone, heterospecific mating negatively correlated with relative abundance. Additionally, in a hybrid zone, females of a rare species produce hybrid sterile offspring and few conspecific offspring through hybridizing. This would cause the rarer species to eventually decline; in regions with similar abundances of C. cobaltinus and C. auratus, C. cobaltinus would be more likely to decline.

== Genetics ==
C. cobaltinus and C. auratus are sister species. Examining the diet of these species show that C. auratus ate Apocynum cannabinum while avoiding Asclepias speciosa and As. syriaca. On the other hand, C. cobaltinus ate all 3 plant species.

Genetic data did not show insertions or deletions in the beetle sequences. Interspecific divergence was small between C. cobaltinus and C. auratus. Within C. cobaltinus, there was genetic differentiation based on geography. The haplotype in Yosemite and Reno regions differs up to 1.3% compared to other sequenced haplotypes.

RFLP analysis shows five haplotypes in C. cobaltinus. Distribution of RFLP haplotypes shows heterogeneity between and within C. cobaltinus populations. A fixation index of 0.766 was given to C. cobaltinus based on the RFLP data. This high differentiation number between C. cobaltinus populations indicates gene flow is low or lacking in the beetle populations.

== Life cycle ==
Adults emerge in early summer and stay on milkweed plants in patches for approximately six weeks. Females are highly polyandrous; males engage in extended periods of post-copulatory mate guarding.

The adult females lay their eggs on the leaves of dogbane and milkweed plants; the larva consumes the leaf tissue between the veins, leaving nothing but a skeleton. On occasion the larva also eats the root system of the plant. C. cobaltinus larvae in large numbers can consume all the plant's leaves. This apparently does not kill the plant; it goes dormant until the following year, although if the larvae consume the root system of the plant, it will eventually wither away.

== Range ==
C. cobaltinus resides in High Plains which reach from British Columbia to the south through Washington, Idaho, Montana, Oregon, California, Nevada, Utah, and Colorado to Arizona and New Mexico. In locations that are east of the Rocky Mountains, the species is replaced by Chrysochus auratus. Historically, the two species were considered to have allopatric distributions.

Other regions have found narrow regions in western North America in which both C. auratus and C. cobaltinus occur and interbreed. These two species form a 25-km wide hybrid zone in the Yakima River valley of Washington state. In these hybrid zones, the species can be found in the same host plant where hybrid mating between the two species has been observed. There is also a second region wherein hybrid mating may occur as well. This region was found in Kamloops, British Columbia. Both species have been collected there. Additionally, the beetles found there have intermediate physical characteristics that would indicate an introgression between C. cobaltinus and C. auratus. There are still many other areas with differing physical characteristics that may be indicative of hybrid mating but have not been confirmed (including areas in Utah).

== Related links ==
- Quinn, Mike (13 May 2017). "Species Chrysochus cobaltinus - Blue Milkweed Beetle". BugGuide.
- The Editors of Encyclopaedia Britannica (23 April 2013). "Cobalt milkweed beetle". Encyclopaedia Britannica.
- http://esa.confex.com/esa/2004/techprogram/paper_15339.htm
- http://www.geog.ubc.ca/biodiversity/efauna/FamiliesofColeopteraofBritishColumbia.html
- https://web.archive.org/web/20110720112837/http://share3.esd105.wednet.edu/rsandelin/fieldguide/Animalpages/Insects/Beetles.htm
