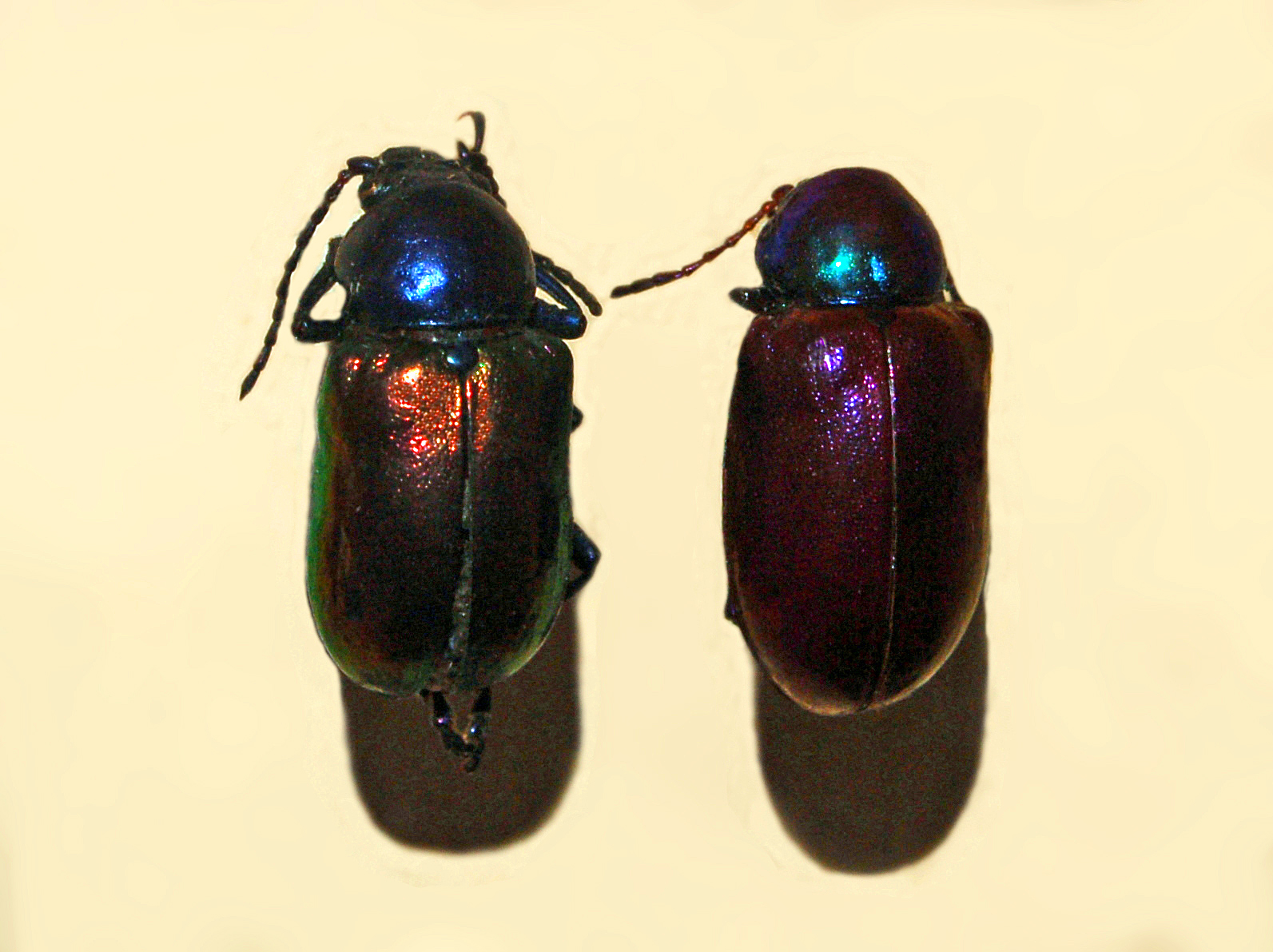
- Chrysochares asiaticus from Russia

Scientific classification
- Kingdom: Animalia
- Phylum: Arthropoda
- Clade: Pancrustacea
- Class: Insecta
- Order: Coleoptera
- Suborder: Polyphaga
- Infraorder: Cucujiformia
- Family: Chrysomelidae
- Genus: Chrysochares
- Species: C. asiaticus

Binomial name
- Chrysochares asiaticus (Pallas, 1771)

Synonyms
- Chrysomela asiatica Pallas, 1771; Cryptocephalus sibiricus J. A. Frölich, 1792; Chrysochares aeneus Ballion, 1878; Chrysochares asiaticus var. virens Weise, 1890; Chrysochares asiaticus var. coerulescens Jacobson, 1894; Chrysochares asiaticus var. ignitus Jacobson, 1894; Chrysochares asiaticus var. violaceomixtus Jacobson, 1894; Chrysochares asiaticus orientalis Lopatin, 1963

= Chrysochares asiaticus =

Species of beetle

Chrysochares asiaticus is a species of beetles belonging to the leaf beetle family, subfamily Eumolpinae.

== Description ==
C. asiaticus reaches about 15–17 mm (0.59–0.67 in) in length. Its pronotum is green or greenish-blue, while the elytra are purple-red, or sometimes blue with a green sheen. The tips of the antennae are black.

== Distribution ==
C. asiaticus is distributed in Azerbaijan, southern European Russia, central Asia, Afghanistan, Mongolia, and Xinjiang (an autonomous region of China).
