= Johann Gottlieb Kugelann =

German entomologist

- Born: 2 January 1753; Königsberg, Kingdom of Prussia
- Died: 8 September 1815 (aged 62); Osterode, Kingdom of Prussia
- Scientific career
- Fields: Entomology; Pharmacy

Johann Gottlieb Kugelann (2 January 1753 – 8 September 1815) was a German entomologist. A pharmacist by profession, Kugelann worked on Coleoptera.

He published (with Johann Karl Wilhelm Illiger and Johann Christian Ludwig Hellwig) in 1798 Verzeichniss der Käfer Preussens.
