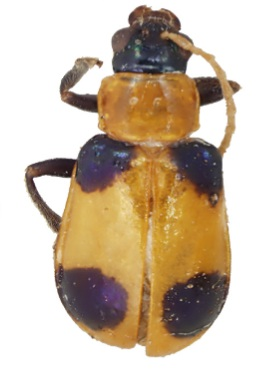
- Leptonesiotes cyanospila

Scientific classification
- Kingdom: Animalia
- Phylum: Arthropoda
- Clade: Pancrustacea
- Class: Insecta
- Order: Coleoptera
- Suborder: Polyphaga
- Infraorder: Cucujiformia
- Family: Chrysomelidae
- Tribe: Luperini
- Subtribe: Diabroticina
- Genus: Leptonesiotes; Blake, 1958

= Leptonesiotes =

Genus of leaf beetles

Leptonesiotes is a genus of beetles belonging to the family Chrysomelidae.

== Species ==
- Leptonesiotes cyanospila (Suffrian, 1867)
- Leptonesiotes quadrimaculata Blake, 1959
- Leptonesiotes semicyaneus (Suffrian, 1867)
- †Leptonesiotes virkkii Santiago-Blay, Poinar & Craig, 1996 – Dominican amber, Miocene
