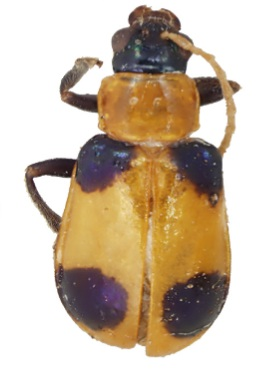

Scientific classification
- Kingdom: Animalia
- Phylum: Arthropoda
- Clade: Pancrustacea
- Class: Insecta
- Order: Coleoptera
- Suborder: Polyphaga
- Infraorder: Cucujiformia
- Family: Chrysomelidae
- Genus: Leptonesiotes
- Species: L. cyanospila

Binomial name
- Leptonesiotes cyanospila (Suffrian, 1867)

Synonyms
- Diabrotica cyanospila Suffrian, 1867

= Leptonesiotes cyanospila =

Species of beetle

Leptonesiotes cyanospila is a species of beetle of the family Chrysomelidae. It is found in Cuba.
