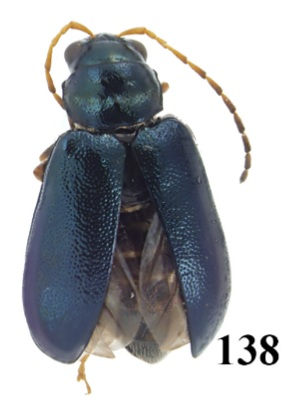

Scientific classification
- Kingdom: Animalia
- Phylum: Arthropoda
- Clade: Pancrustacea
- Class: Insecta
- Order: Coleoptera
- Suborder: Polyphaga
- Infraorder: Cucujiformia
- Family: Chrysomelidae
- Tribe: Luperini
- Subtribe: Luperina
- Genus: Eusattodera
- Species: E. pini

Binomial name
- Eusattodera pini Schaeffer, 1906

= Eusattodera pini =

Species of beetle

Eusattodera pini is a species of skeletonizing leaf beetle in the family Chrysomelidae. It is found in North America.
