= Eusattodera =

Scientific classification
- Kingdom: Animalia
- Phylum: Arthropoda
- Clade: Pancrustacea
- Class: Insecta
- Order: Coleoptera
- Suborder: Polyphaga
- Infraorder: Cucujiformia
- Family: Chrysomelidae
- Subfamily: Galerucinae
- Tribe: Luperini
- Subtribe: Luperina
- Genus: Eusattodera; Schaeffer, 1906

Genus of beetles

Eusattodera is a genus of skeletonizing leaf beetles in the family Chrysomelidae. There are about six described species in Eusattodera. They are found in North America.

== Species ==
These six species belong to the genus Eusattodera:

- Eusattodera delta Wilcox, 1965
- Eusattodera intermixta (Fall, 1910)
- Eusattodera luteicollis (J. L. LeConte, 1868)
- Eusattodera pini Schaeffer, 1906
- Eusattodera rugosa (Jacoby, 1888)
- Eusattodera thoracica (F. E. Melsheimer, 1847)
