= Caudellia apyrella =

Scientific classification
- Domain: Eukaryota
- Kingdom: Animalia
- Phylum: Arthropoda
- Class: Insecta
- Order: Lepidoptera
- Family: Pyralidae
- Genus: Caudellia
- Species: C. apyrella

Binomial name
- Caudellia apyrella Dyar, 1904

Synonyms
- Caudellia albovittella Dyar 1904

Species of moth

Caudellia apyrella, the crescent-winged caudellia moth, is a species of snout moth in the genus Caudellia. It was described by Harrison Gray Dyar Jr. in 1904 in honor of his colleague Andrew Nelson Caudell. It is found in North America.

The larvae feed on Cuscuta compacta and Cuscuta gronovii.
