= Kanas Lake =

Lake in Xinjiang, China

- Mongolian: Ханас нуур; Uyghur: قاناس كۆلى; Kazakh: Қанас көлі
- 喀纳斯湖 (Chinese)
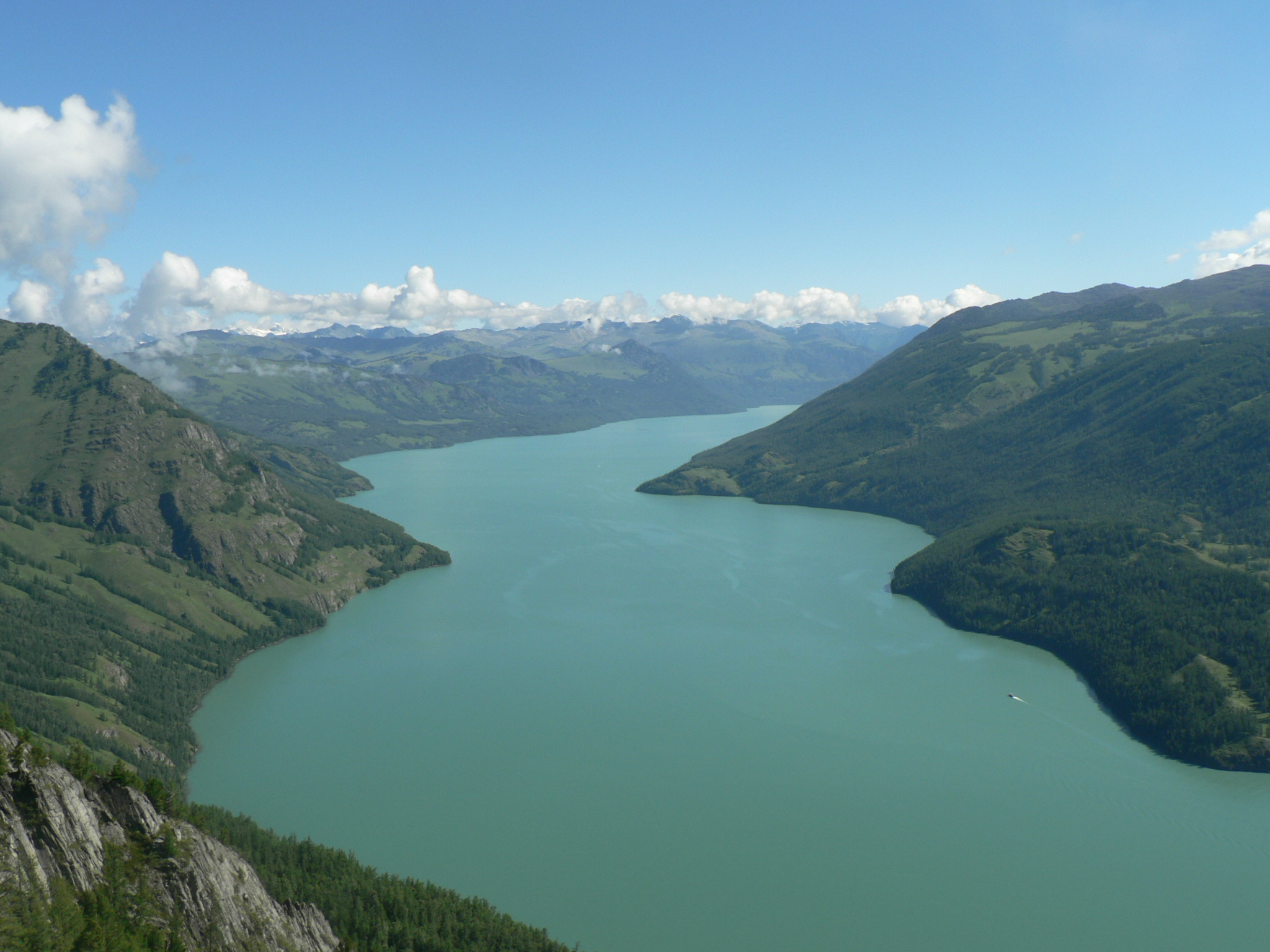

- Location within Dzungaria
- Location: Xinjiang, China
- Coordinates: 48°48′54″N 87°02′24″E
- Primary outflows: Kanas River
- Basin countries: China
- Surface area: 45.73 km^{2} (17.66 sq mi)
- Average depth: 120 m (390 ft)
- Max. depth: 188.5 m (618 ft)
- Water volume: 5.49 km^{3} (1.32 cu mi)
- Surface elevation: 1,340 m (4,400 ft)

Kanas Lake (Chinese: 喀纳斯湖; pinyin: Kānàsī Hú, Xiao'erjing: كَانَاسِ خٗ; Mongolian: Ханас нуур; Uyghur: قاناس كۆلى, romanized: Qanas köli, UYY: Ⱪanas köli, USY: Қанас Көли) is a lake in Altay Prefecture, Xinjiang, China. The lake is located in a valley in the Altai Mountains, near the very northern tip of Xinjiang and the autonomous region's borders with Russia, Kazakhstan and Mongolia. The lake was formed around 200,000 years ago during the Quaternary period as a result of glacier movement. The crescent moon shaped lake has an estimated water storage capacity of 53.8 billion cubic meters, coupled with an average depth of around 120 meters.

The Kanas River, flowing out of the lake, later merges with the Hemu River to form the Burqin River, which itself discharges into the Irtysh River at Burqin Town, the county seat of Burqin County.

There is a large population of ethnic Tuvans and Kazakhs in the Kanas valley. While most of these people have maintained their traditional agricultural and nomadic life styles, many work in the developing tourism industry and have established facilities for orienteering, hiking, rafting, rock climbing, paragliding and camping. The scenic spot is classified as a AAAAA scenic area by the China National Tourism Administration.

== Giant fish ==
For several centuries there have been sightings of large lake creatures in the waters. First efforts in research of these legends were done by Yuan Guoying of Xinjiang University, who observed fish of enormous size in 1985. He and his students assessed that the fish could be 10 – 15 m long and weigh more than 4 tons, with total population in excess of 50 individuals.

Frequency of observation has increased in the 21st century, with the development of mass tourism. A video was taken and shown in the local Chinese media where numerous unidentifiable creatures can be seen. According to CCTV-10, the creatures living in the lake are speculated by Chinese scholars to be giant Hucho taimen.

== Gallery ==
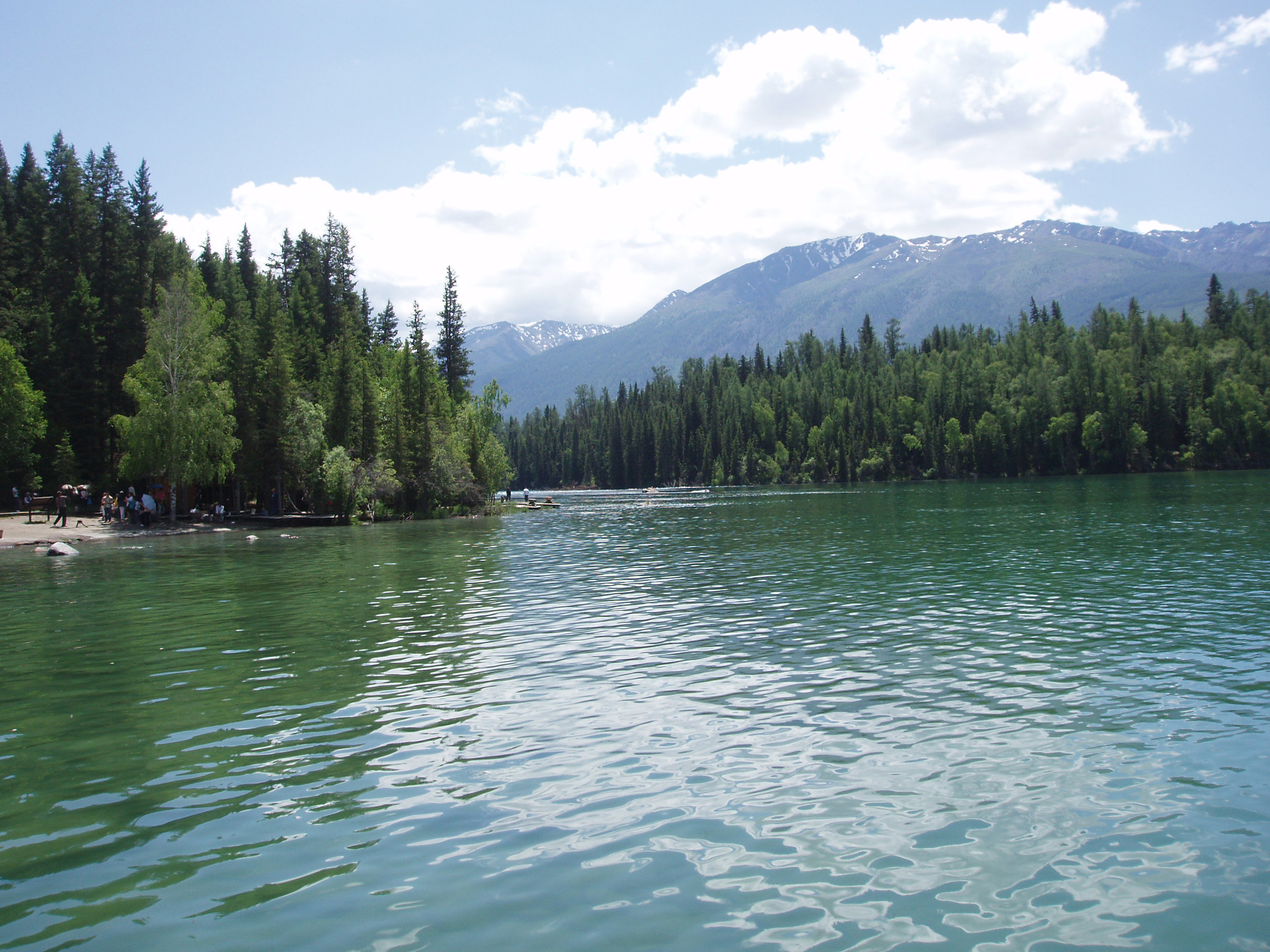
Kanas view

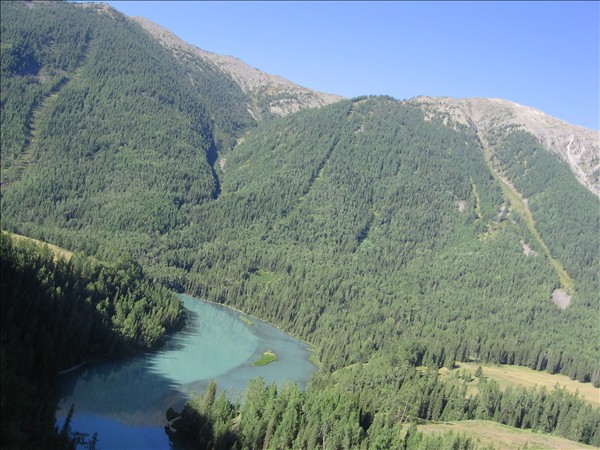
Kanas lake besides the alpine glacier

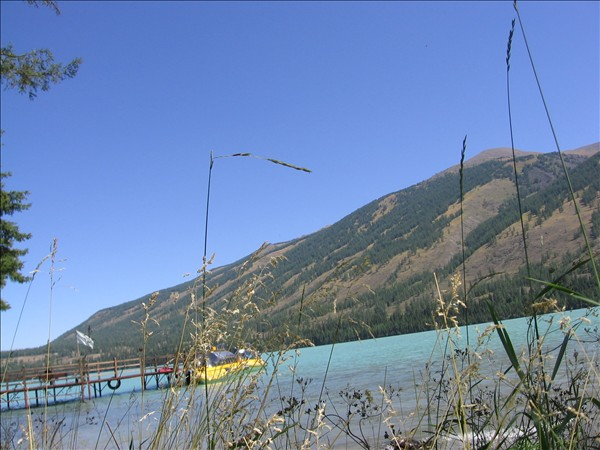
Kanas lake tour

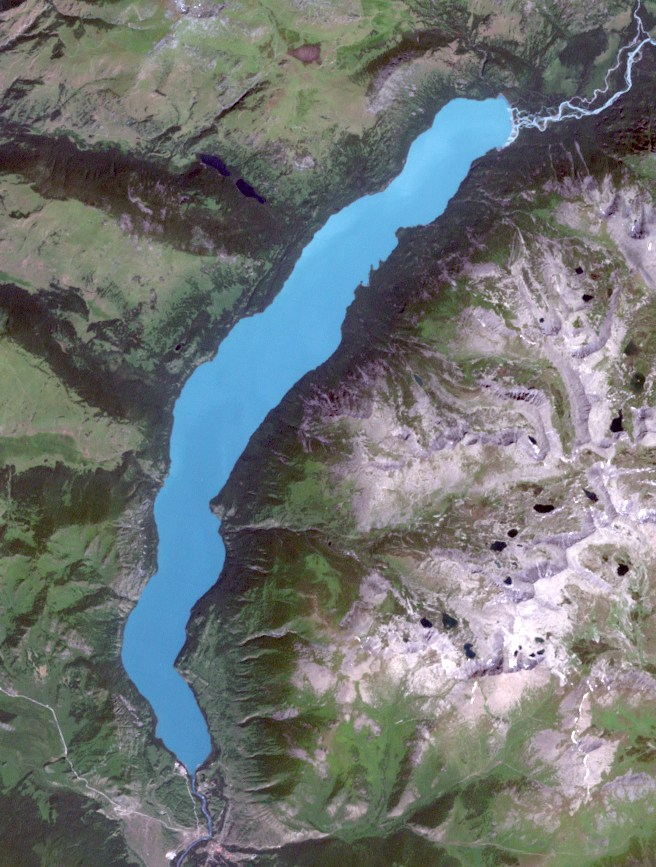
Lake Kanas satellite Landsat 7, 2015

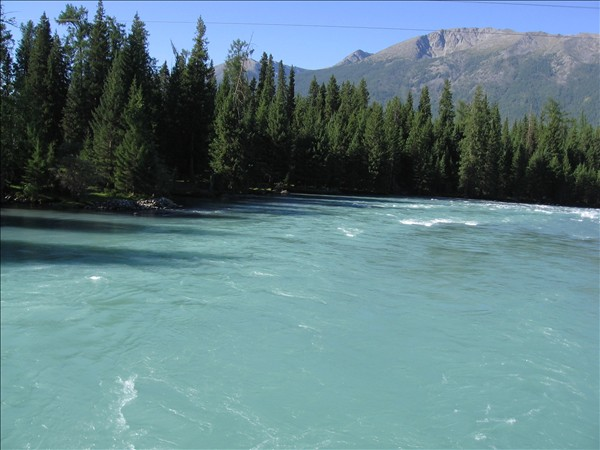
The Kanas River, part of the Irtysh River to the Arctic Ocean, view from rafting boat

== See also ==
- Ake Kule Lake
- Tourism in China
