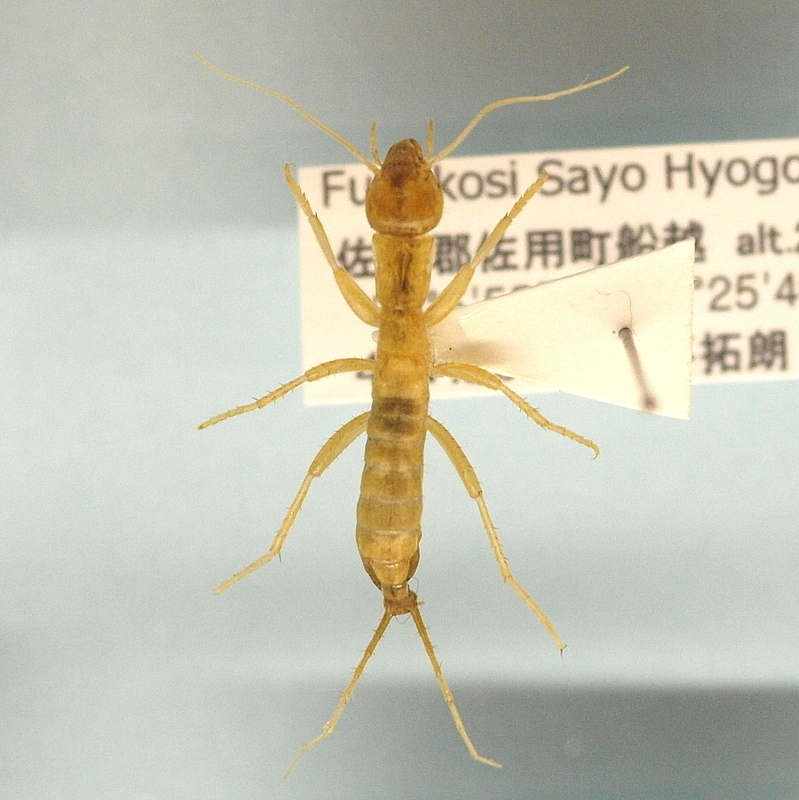
- Galloisiana nipponensis
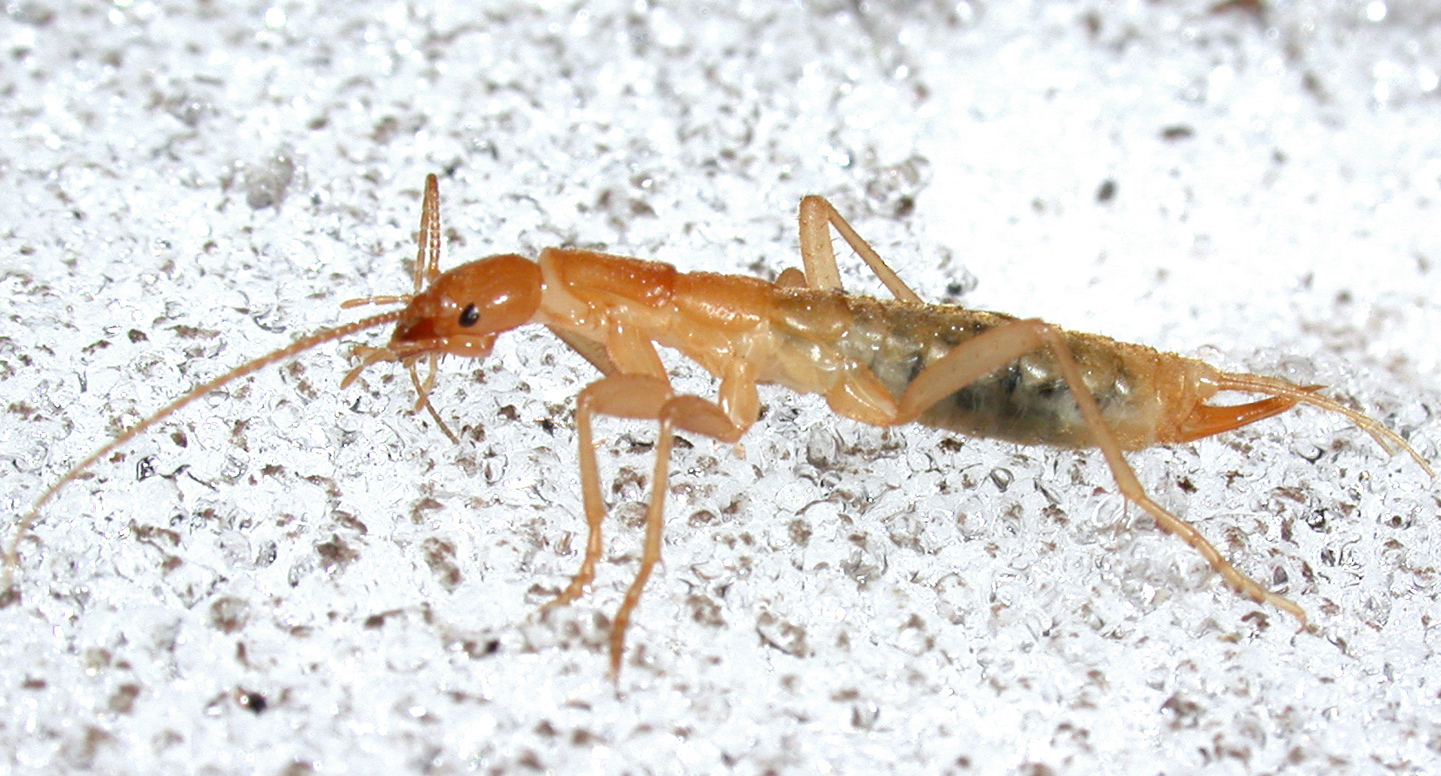
- Specimen of Grylloblatta in lateral view

Scientific classification
- Kingdom: Animalia
- Phylum: Arthropoda
- Clade: Pancrustacea
- Class: Insecta
- Cohort: Polyneoptera
- Clade: Notoptera
- Order: Grylloblattodea; Brues & Melander, 1932
- Family: Grylloblattidae; E. M. Walker, 1914

Genera
- Galloisiana; Grylloblatta; Grylloblattella; Grylloblattina; Namkungia

= Grylloblattidae =

Family of insects

Grylloblattidae, commonly known as the icebugs or ice crawlers, is a family of extremophile (psychrophile) and wingless insects that live in the cold on top of mountains and the edges of glaciers. They are the only living members of Grylloblattodea, which is generally considered an order. Alternatively, Grylloblattodea, along with Mantophasmatodea (rock crawlers), have been ranked as suborders of the order Notoptera. Grylloblattids are wingless insects mostly less than 3 cm long, with a head resembling that of a cockroach, with long antennae and having elongated cerci arising from the tip of their abdomen. They cannot tolerate warmth—most species will die at 10 °C (50 °F)—and many species have small distribution ranges.

== Overview ==
Grylloblattids, ice crawlers or icebugs puzzled the scientists who discovered them in 1914, E.M. Walker and T.B. Kurata; the first species named was Grylloblatta campodeiformis, which means "cricket-cockroach shaped like a Campodea" (a kind of two-pronged bristletail). Most are nocturnal and appear to feed on detritus. They have long antennae (23–45 segments) and long cerci (5–8 segments), but no wings. Their eyes are either missing or reduced and they have no ocelli (simple eyes). Their closest living relatives are the recently discovered Mantophasmatodea. Most species are less than 3 cm long, the largest being Namkungia magnus.

The family has its own order, Grylloblattodea (sometimes considered a suborder of Notoptera). It contains 5 genera and about 34 extant species.

Most species have restricted distributions and small populations and with increased warming their habitats are threatened, making them endangered. In North America some species like Grylloblatta barberi and G. oregonensis are known from single sites.

== Habitat and distribution ==
Grylloblattodea are nocturnal extremophiles typically found in leaf litter and under stones in extremely cold environments, usually at higher elevations. They are known to inhabit cold temperate forests to glaciers and the edges of ice sheets. Studies of several North American populations of Grylloblatta have found extremely narrow physiological temperature tolerances, with supercooling points around –4 °C and upper lethal limits near +27 °C, indicating that these insects are specialized for cold. They can be killed at lower temperatures due to ice formation in the body, so when the temperature drops below their optimal range they survive by living under snow pack near the soil. They are very sensitive to heat; many species are killed when the temperature rises about 5 °C above their optimal temperature. They move in response to the seasons so as to maintain an optimal temperature in their foraging habitat.

Grylloblattidae are patchily distributed in glaciers, caves, montane environments, and occasionally lower-elevation forests in western North America, East Asia (Korea and Japan), and Central Asia (Siberia, China, and Kazakhstan). They are predicted to occur in several other mountain chains in Asia, including parts of the Himalayas.

== Diet ==
Grylloblattids are omnivorous, but feed primarily on dead arthropods and carrion. When arthropod carcasses are scarce, they subsist on plant material.

== Evolution ==
Grylloblattidae is generally thought to have emerged from within the "Grylloblattida", a poorly defined group of extinct winged insects that first appeared in the Late Carboniferous, over 300 million years ago. The winged Aristovia from the mid-Cretaceous Burmese amber of Myanmar, around 100 million years ago is thought to be closely related to modern Grylloblattidae due to its very similar mouthparts.

== Taxonomy ==
List of Grylloblattodea genera and species along with their type localities:

- Arctigalloisiana Nakahama, Yamasaki, Komazawa & Nakano, 2023 – Hokkaido, Japan
  - Arctigalloisiana poropnetopa Nakahama, Yamasaki, Komazawa & Nakano, 2023 – type locality: Kineusu, Urakawa, Hokkaido, Japan
  - Arctigalloisiana yezoensis (Asahina 1961) – type locality: Miyazaki-Toge, Japan
  - Arctigalloisiana yubariensis Nakahama, Yamasaki, Komazawa & Nakano, 2023 – type locality: Niwan Pass, Atsuma, Hokkaido, Japan
- Galloisiana Caudell 1924 – Far East Asia
  - Galloisiana chujoi Gurney 1961 – type locality: Oninoiwaya Cave, Japan
  - Galloisiana kiyosawai Asahina 1959 – type locality: Hirayu-Onsen, Japan
  - Galloisiana kosuensis Namkung 1974 – type locality: Gosu Cave, South Korea
  - Galloisiana nipponensis (Caudell & King 1924) – type locality: Lake Chūzenji, Japan
  - Galloisiana notabilis (Silvestri 1927) – type locality: Nagasaki Prefecture, Japan
  - Galloisiana odaesanensis Kim & Lee 2007 – type locality: Mount Odae, South Korea
  - Galloisiana olgae Vrsansky & Storozhenko 2001 – type locality: Mount Olga, Russia
  - Galloisiana sinensis Wang 1987 – type locality: Changbaishan, Jilin, PR China
  - Galloisiana sofiae Szeptycki 1987 – type locality: Mount Myohyang, North Korea
  - Galloisiana ussuriensis Storozhenko 1988 – type locality: Primorsky Krai, Russia
  - Galloisiana yuasai Asahina 1959 – type locality: Tokugo-Toge, Japan
- Grylloblatta Walker 1914 – western North America
  - Grylloblatta barberi Caudell 1924 – type locality: Sunny Side Mine, Mount Lassen area, California, USA
  - Grylloblatta bifratrilecta Gurney 1953 – type locality: Sonora Pass, California, USA
  - Grylloblatta campodeiformis Walker 1914 – type locality: Sulphur Mountain, Alberta, Canada
  - Grylloblatta chandleri Kamp 1963 – type locality: Eagle Lake, California, USA
  - Grylloblatta chintimini Marshall & Lytle 2015 – type locality: Marys Peak, Oregon, USA
  - Grylloblatta chirurgica Gurney 1961 – type locality: Ape Cave, Washington, USA
  - Grylloblatta gurneyi Kamp 1963 – type locality: Lava Beds National Monument, California, USA
  - Grylloblatta marmoreus Schoville 2012 – type locality: Marble Mountains, California, USA
  - Grylloblatta newberryensis Marshall & Lytle 2015 – type locality: Newberry Volcano, Oregon, USA
  - Grylloblatta oregonensis Schoville 2012 – type locality: Oregon Caves National Monument, USA
  - Grylloblatta rothi Gurney 1953 – type locality: Happy Valley, Deschutes County, Oregon, USA
  - Grylloblatta scudderi Kamp 1979 – type locality: Mount Paul, Alberta, Canada
  - Grylloblatta sculleni Gurney 1937 – type locality: Scott Camp, Deschutes County, Oregon, USA
  - Grylloblatta siskiyouensis Schoville 2012 – type locality: Oregon Caves National Monument, USA
  - Grylloblatta washoa Gurney 1961 – type locality: Echo Summit, California, USA
- Grylloblattella Storozhenko 1988 – Central Asia
  - Grylloblattella cheni Bai, Wang & Yang 2010 – type locality: Ake Kule Lake, Xinjiang, China
  - Grylloblattella pravdini (Storozhenko & Oliger 1984) – type locality: Teletskoye Lake, Russia
  - Grylloblattella sayanensis Storozhenko 1996 – type locality: Sambyl Pass, Russia
- Grylloblattina Bey-Bienko 1951 – Far East Asia
  - Grylloblattina djakonovi Bey-Bienko 1951
- Namkungia Storozhenko & Park 2002 – Korea
  - Namkungia biryongensis (Namkung 1974) – type locality: Biryong Cave, South Korea
  - Namkungia magna (Namkung 1986) – type locality: Balgudeok Cave, South Korea

In total, there are 35 extant species and 6 extant genera described as of 2023.
