= Grylloblatta barberi =

Scientific classification
- Kingdom: Animalia
- Phylum: Arthropoda
- Clade: Pancrustacea
- Class: Insecta
- Order: Grylloblattodea
- Family: Grylloblattidae
- Genus: Grylloblatta
- Species: G. barberi

Binomial name
- Grylloblatta barberi Caudell, 1924

Species of insect

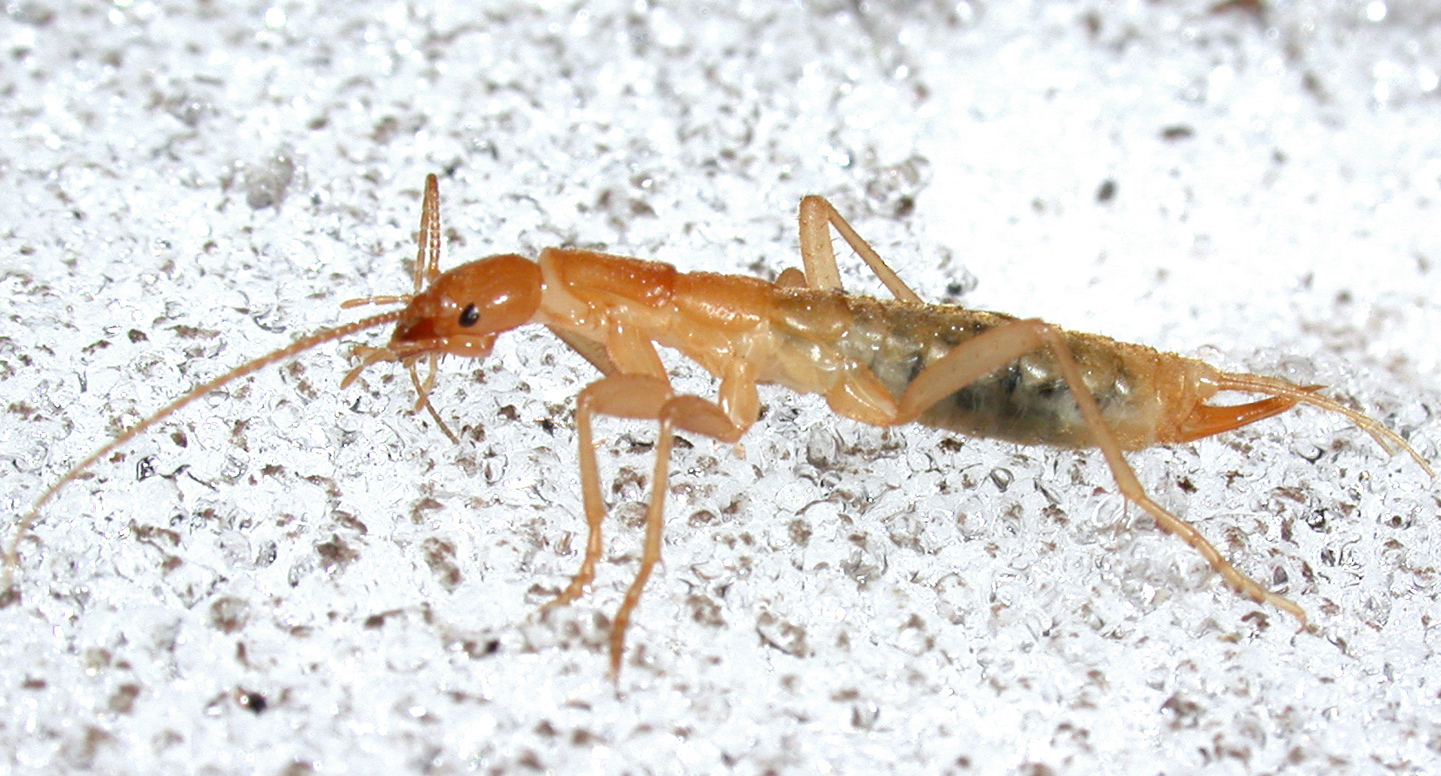
Ice crawler (Grylloblattidae) photographed live at night on an ice field, Northern California, USA.

Grylloblatta barberi is a North American species of wingless insect in the genus Grylloblatta. It is a rock crawler that lives at high altitudes in crevices under snow or glaciers. It was first described by Andrew Nelson Caudell in 1924 as part of a relict lineage of nocturnal and wingless insects that are adapted to living in near-freezing environments. Members of the genus Grylloblatta occupy the snow-covered tips of slopes in subnivean spaces or in glacial margins, where they commonly exhibit scavenging behavior and slow development. Molecular and morphological evidence have been utilized to place Grylloblatta barberi within the family Grylloblattidae. This research also provides support for the monophyly of Grylloblattodea as being part of the Polyneoptera.

== Taxonomic history ==
Grylloblatta barberi was previously formally described by Caudell (1924) based on specimens collected from Plumas County, California, where it was noted for its pale coloration and reduced eyes. This is typical for the order Grylloblattodea. Caudell originally placed the species within the previously poorly understood order Grylloblattodea which had only recently been recognized at the time.

== Phylogenetic relationships ==
Molecular studies that use nuclear genes (i.e., 18S rRNA, 28S rRNA, histone H3) provide support for the placement of Grylloblattidae within the superorder Polyneoptera. These findings also indicate a relationship between Grylloblattodea and Mantophasmatodea that is reflective of a sister-group. This denotes the clade Xenonomia. Recent expanded phylogenomic analyses studies (Wipfler et al. 2019; Beutel et al. 2015) ascribe Grylloblattodea to a distinct, early branching polyneopteran lineage.

== General morphology ==
Grylloblatta barberi is a wingless elongated insect measuring approximately 15–20 mm in length based on early and mid-century morphological descriptions. Adults are pale yellowish-brown and possess:

- Reduced compound eyes with few facets
- No ocelli
- Filiform, multi-segmented antennae
- Long, multi-segmented cerci extending from the abdomen
- Soft, lightly sclerotized cuticle
- Slender legs that are adapted for navigating rocky talus

The original description by Caudell provides an emphasis on the reduced visual structures of these insects, along with their elongated body and appendages. These characteristics reflect common adaptations to cold microhabitats with low levels of sunlight.

Kamp (1963) later provided more detailed morphological evidence on the basis of a description of the adult form. This evidence included the proportional length of antennal segments, tarsal structure, as well as abdominal segmentation.

Adult females possess a basal scape followed by 38 flagellomeres, with flagellomere II measuring 1.8 x the length of flagellomere I. Females also have several rows of characteristic spinelike setae along their parietal sutures/frons. They express very advanced tarsal pads found on the apices of their first four tarsomeres. They also present pulvilli on all of these tarsomeres that are apical and have leg ratios indicative of elongated tibia and femora. Adults also have cerci with 9 segments, each possessing conspicuous setae.

== Diagnostic features ==
Traits that distinguish G. barberi from closely related Grylloblatta species include subtle differences in:

- Cerci segment proportions
- Antennal segmentation count
- Genitalic structures

These characters are essential for identification to the level of species due to the morphological similarity that is present across the genus.

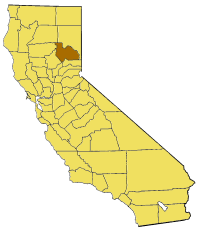
Grylloblatta barberi is endemic to Plumas County, California.

== Distribution ==
Grylloblatta barberi is restricted to Plumas County, California. Specimens have been collected in the North Fork Feather River area of California. The species was first collected at the junction of Butte Creek and the North Fork, where the holotype male nymph was taken on the 23rd of January 1923. Three additional immature specimens (paratypes A–C) were collected at the same locality.

Later collections confirm the extremely narrow range that this species possesses. It has been shown to be confined to this area of the Feather River canyon.

All known records fall within the periglacial zone of the late Pleistocene Tioga glaciation near Mount Lassen. This dispersal pattern is consistent with the glacial-relict distributions that are documented for many California Grylloblatta species.

== Habitat ==
Grylloblatta barberi is known only from a small stretch of the North Fork of the Feather River and its surrounding slopes.

The species occupies cold and rocky microhabitats, including:

- Talus slopes
- Under packed snow
- Moist crevices in boulders
- Periglacial and alpine-zone rock fields

These habitats remain near freezing, which provides stable thermal and moisture conditions that are required by Grylloblattidae.G. barberi is highly sensitive to temperatures above ~10 °C and will retreat deep into rock crevices during warmer periods.

== Biology and behavior ==
These insects are nocturnal and only come out at night when the temperature drops, providing them with more preferable conditions for foraging. Their reduced eyes and pale color mirror this lifestyle of G. barberi.

Scavenging is the dominant behavior, with adults feeding on dead insects, cold-immobilized arthropods, and organic debris within rock fragments.

G. barberi exhibits rather slow development as these insects require multiple years to complete their nymphal stages. This leisurely development is a hallmark of ice crawlers and is typical of cold-adapted insects inhabiting environments with short growing seasons.

== Evolutionary significance ==
Phylogenomic analysis identifies G. barberi along with its relatives as being a part of an ancient and relict insect lineage that survived various periods of climate warming. They did this through retreating to higher elevations for refuge, where temperatures are colder. This extreme specialization of Grylloblattodea for colder habitats can provide insight into early insect diversification within the Polyneoptera.

== Conservation ==
Grylloblatta barberi is not formally assessed by the IUCN; however, it is considered vulnerable due to:

- Restricted distribution
- Dependence on cold microhabitats
- Potential threats from climate warming, including glacial retreat and reduced snow cover
