= Colaspina =

Scientific classification
- Kingdom: Animalia
- Phylum: Arthropoda
- Clade: Pancrustacea
- Class: Insecta
- Order: Coleoptera
- Suborder: Polyphaga
- Infraorder: Cucujiformia
- Family: Chrysomelidae
- Subfamily: Eumolpinae
- Tribe: Bromiini
- Genus: Colaspina; Weise, 1893
- Species: C. saportae

Binomial name
- Colaspina saportae (Grenier, 1863)

Synonyms
- Dia saportae Grenier, 1863

Genus of leaf beetles from Spain and southern France

Colaspina is a genus of leaf beetles in the subfamily Eumolpinae. It contains only one species, Colaspina saportae, known from Spain and southern France (Provence). The species was first described from Aix-en-Provence in 1863 by Auguste Jean François Grenier, who dedicated it to the Marquess of Saporta. It has recently been suggested that Colaspina is possibly a sister genus to both Chalcosicya and Mediterranean Colaspidea combined.
