= Namkungia =

Scientific classification
- Domain: Eukaryota
- Kingdom: Animalia
- Phylum: Arthropoda
- Class: Insecta
- Order: Grylloblattodea
- Family: Grylloblattidae
- Genus: Namkungia; Storozhenko & Park 2002

Species
- see text

Genus of insects

Namkungia is a genus of cave-dwelling insects in the family Grylloblattidae found in Korea. It contains 2 species, both of which are found in caves in Jeongseon County, Gangwon Province, South Korea.

== Species ==
These species belong to the genus Namkungia:

- Namkungia biryongensis (Namkung 1974) – type locality: Biryong Cave, Jeongseon County, Gangwon Province, South Korea
- Namkungia magna (Namkung 1986) – type locality: Balgudeok Cave, Jeongseon County, Gangwon Province, South Korea
