= Grylloblattella cheni =

Scientific classification
- Kingdom: Animalia
- Phylum: Arthropoda
- Class: Insecta
- Order: Grylloblattodea
- Family: Grylloblattidae
- Genus: Grylloblattella
- Species: G. cheni

Binomial name
- Grylloblattella cheni Bai, Wang & Yang 2010

Species of insect

Grylloblattella cheni is a species of insect in the family Grylloblattidae. Its type locality is Ake Kule Lake in Xinjiang, China.
