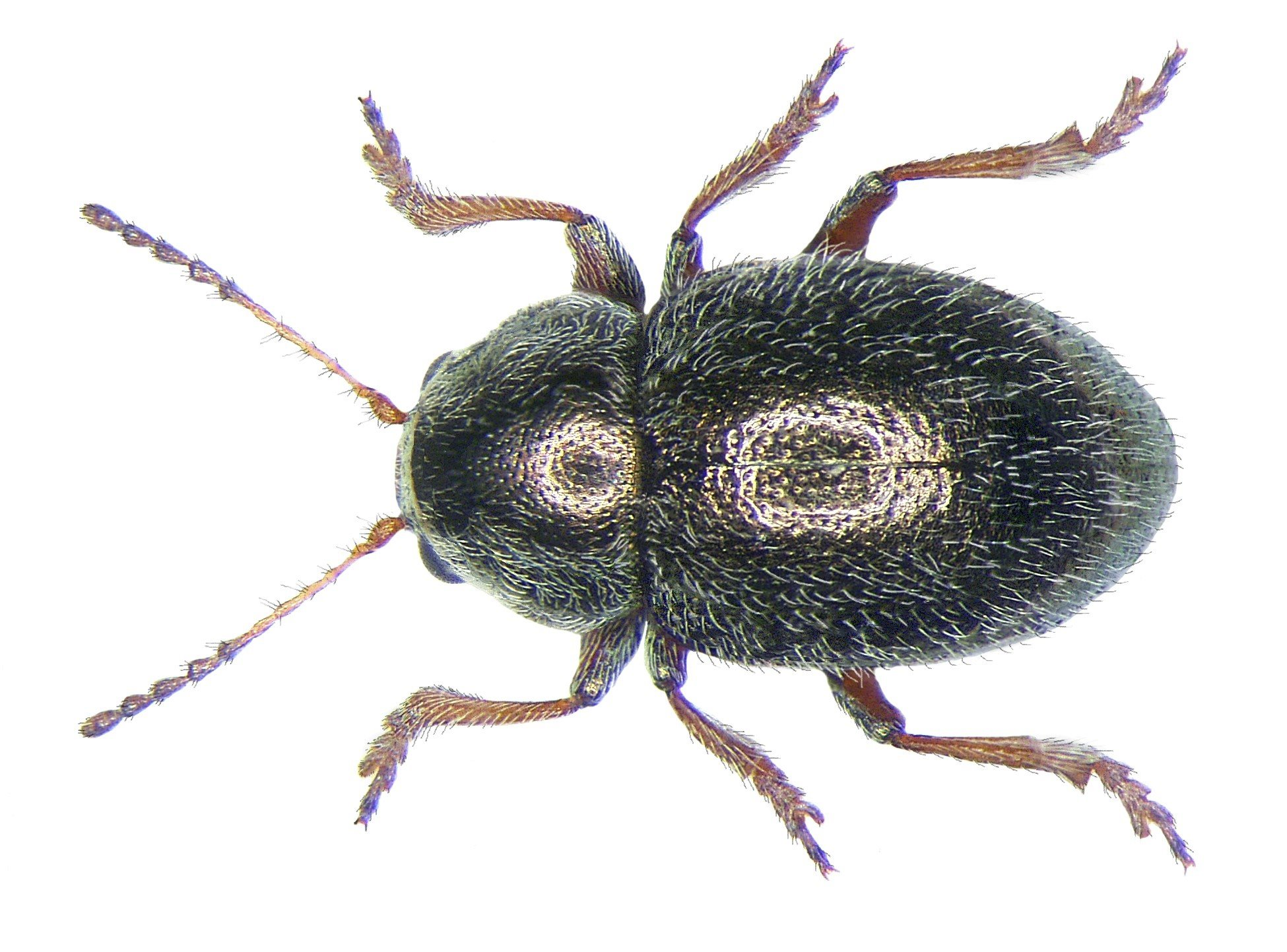
- Colaspidea oblonga

Scientific classification
- Kingdom: Animalia
- Phylum: Arthropoda
- Clade: Pancrustacea
- Class: Insecta
- Order: Coleoptera
- Suborder: Polyphaga
- Infraorder: Cucujiformia
- Family: Chrysomelidae
- Subfamily: Eumolpinae
- Tribe: Bromiini
- Genus: Colaspidea; Laporte, 1833

Type species
- Chrysomela aeruginea (= Chrysomela metallica Rossi, 1790) Fabricius, 1792

Synonyms
- Dia Dejean, 1836; Plestya Gistel, 1848

= Colaspidea =

Genus of leaf beetles

Colaspidea is a genus of leaf beetles in the subfamily Eumolpinae. It is known from North America (California and the southwestern United States) and the Mediterranean. It has recently been suggested that the Mediterranean species of Colaspidea are a sister genus to Chalcosicya, and that Colaspina forms a sister genus to the former two combined. It has also been suggested that the North American species of Colaspidea may represent a separate genus.

The North American species of Colaspidea have wings, while the Mediterranean species are wingless.

== Species ==
There are 19 described species in the genus Colaspidea:

Mediterranean species:

- Colaspidea algarvensis Zoia, 2014 – Portugal, Spain
- Colaspidea confinis Zoia, 2014 – Algeria
- Colaspidea dogueti Zoia, 2014 – Algeria
- Colaspidea globosa (Küster, 1848)^{g} – Portugal, Spain, Southern France
- Colaspidea graeca Zoia, 2014 – Greece
- Colaspidea grossa Fairmaire, 1866^{g} – Morocco
- Colaspidea incerta Zoia, 2014 – Algeria
- Colaspidea inflata Lefèvre, 1876 – Algeria
- Colaspidea juengeri Doguet, 1988 (formerly a subspecies of C. metallica) – Corfu, Sicily
- Colaspidea maghrebina Zoia, 2014 – Algeria
- Colaspidea maura Zoia, 2014 – Morocco, Algeria
- Colaspidea metallica (Rossi, 1790)^{g} – Central Italy
- Colaspidea oblonga (Blanchard, 1845)^{g} (synonyms: C. nitida H. Lucas, 1846; C. oblonga (Fairmaire, 1862); C. oblonga albanica Schatzmayr, 1923) – Corsica, Central and Southern Italy, Sardinia, Sicily, Croatia, Corfu, Greece, Crete, Morocco, Algeria, Tunisia
- Colaspidea ovulum Fairmaire, 1866 – Algeria
- Colaspidea pallidipes Zoia, 2014 – Morocco, Spain
- Colaspidea proxima (Fairmaire, 1862)^{g} – Spain, Southern France, Northern and Central Italy, Croatia, Algeria, Tunisia

North American species:

- Colaspidea pallipes Fall, 1933^{i c g} – Arizona, California, Nevada, Utah
- Colaspidea pomonae Fall, 1933^{i c g} – California
- Colaspidea smaragdula (LeConte, 1857)^{i c g b} – Arizona, California, Nevada, Oregon

Data sources: i = ITIS, c = Catalogue of Life, g = GBIF, b = BugGuide
