= Grylloblattella =

Scientific classification
- Kingdom: Animalia
- Phylum: Arthropoda
- Class: Insecta
- Order: Grylloblattodea
- Family: Grylloblattidae
- Genus: Grylloblattella; Storozhenko 1988

Species
- 15 species

Genus of insects

Grylloblattella is a genus of insects in the family Grylloblattidae found in the Altai-Sayan region of Central Asia. It contains 3 species restricted to montane environments in southern Siberia (Russia), China, and Kazakhstan.

== Species ==
These species belong to the genus Grylloblattella:

- Grylloblattella cheni Bai, Wang & Yang 2010 – type locality: Ake Kule Lake, Xinjiang, China
- Grylloblattella pravdini (Storozhenko & Oliger 1984) – type locality: Teletskoye Lake, Russia
- Grylloblattella sayanensis Storozhenko 1996 – type locality: Sambyl Pass, Russia

== Habitat ==
They are found in rocky streams and talus fields, including low-elevation microhabitats that are cold and humid. Unlike some other grylloblattids, they have not been found at montane sites.

Grylloblattella forage on snowfields at night. They are also often also active during the day in rocky habitats.
