= Grylloblatta gurneyi =

Scientific classification
- Kingdom: Animalia
- Phylum: Arthropoda
- Class: Insecta
- Order: Grylloblattodea
- Family: Grylloblattidae
- Genus: Grylloblatta
- Species: G. gurneyi

Binomial name
- Grylloblatta gurneyi Kamp 1963

Species of insect

Grylloblatta gurneyi is a species of wingless insect in the family Grylloblattidae. Its type locality is Lava Beds National Monument in northeastern California, United States.

== Habitat ==
It is found in lava tubes with ice formations.
