= Colaspidea metallica =

Scientific classification
- Kingdom: Animalia
- Phylum: Arthropoda
- Clade: Pancrustacea
- Class: Insecta
- Order: Coleoptera
- Suborder: Polyphaga
- Infraorder: Cucujiformia
- Family: Chrysomelidae
- Genus: Colaspidea
- Species: C. metallica

Binomial name
- Colaspidea metallica (Rossi, 1790)

Synonyms
- Chrysomela aeruginea Fabricius, 1792; Chrysomela metallica Rossi, 1790; Dia sphoeroides Fairmaire, 1862

Species of beetle

Colaspidea metallica is a species of beetle in the Chrysomelidae family that can be found on the Greek island Corfu and the Italian islands of Sardinia and Sicily. It can also be found in France.
