= Grylloblatta newberryensis =

Scientific classification
- Domain: Eukaryota
- Kingdom: Animalia
- Phylum: Arthropoda
- Class: Insecta
- Order: Grylloblattodea
- Family: Grylloblattidae
- Genus: Grylloblatta
- Species: G. newberryensis

Binomial name
- Grylloblatta newberryensis Marshall & Lytle 2015

Species of insect

Grylloblatta newberryensis is a species of insect in the family Grylloblattidae. It is found in central Oregon, United States.

Its type locality is Newberry Volcano in central Oregon.
