= Caudellia floridensis =

Scientific classification
- Domain: Eukaryota
- Kingdom: Animalia
- Phylum: Arthropoda
- Class: Insecta
- Order: Lepidoptera
- Family: Pyralidae
- Genus: Caudellia
- Species: C. floridensis

Binomial name
- Caudellia floridensis Neunzig, 1990

Synonyms
- Caudellia flordensis

Species of moth

Caudellia floridensis is a species of snout moth in the genus Caudellia. It was described by Herbert H. Neunzig in 1990, and is known from the US state of Florida.
