= Caudellia galapagosensis =

Scientific classification
- Kingdom: Animalia
- Phylum: Arthropoda
- Clade: Pancrustacea
- Class: Insecta
- Order: Lepidoptera
- Family: Pyralidae
- Genus: Caudellia
- Species: C. galapagosensis

Binomial name
- Caudellia galapagosensis Landry & Neunzig, 2006

Species of moth

Caudellia galapagosensis is a species of snout moth in the genus Caudellia. It was described by Bernard Landry and Herbert H. Neunzig in 2006 and is known from Ecuador's Galápagos Islands.
