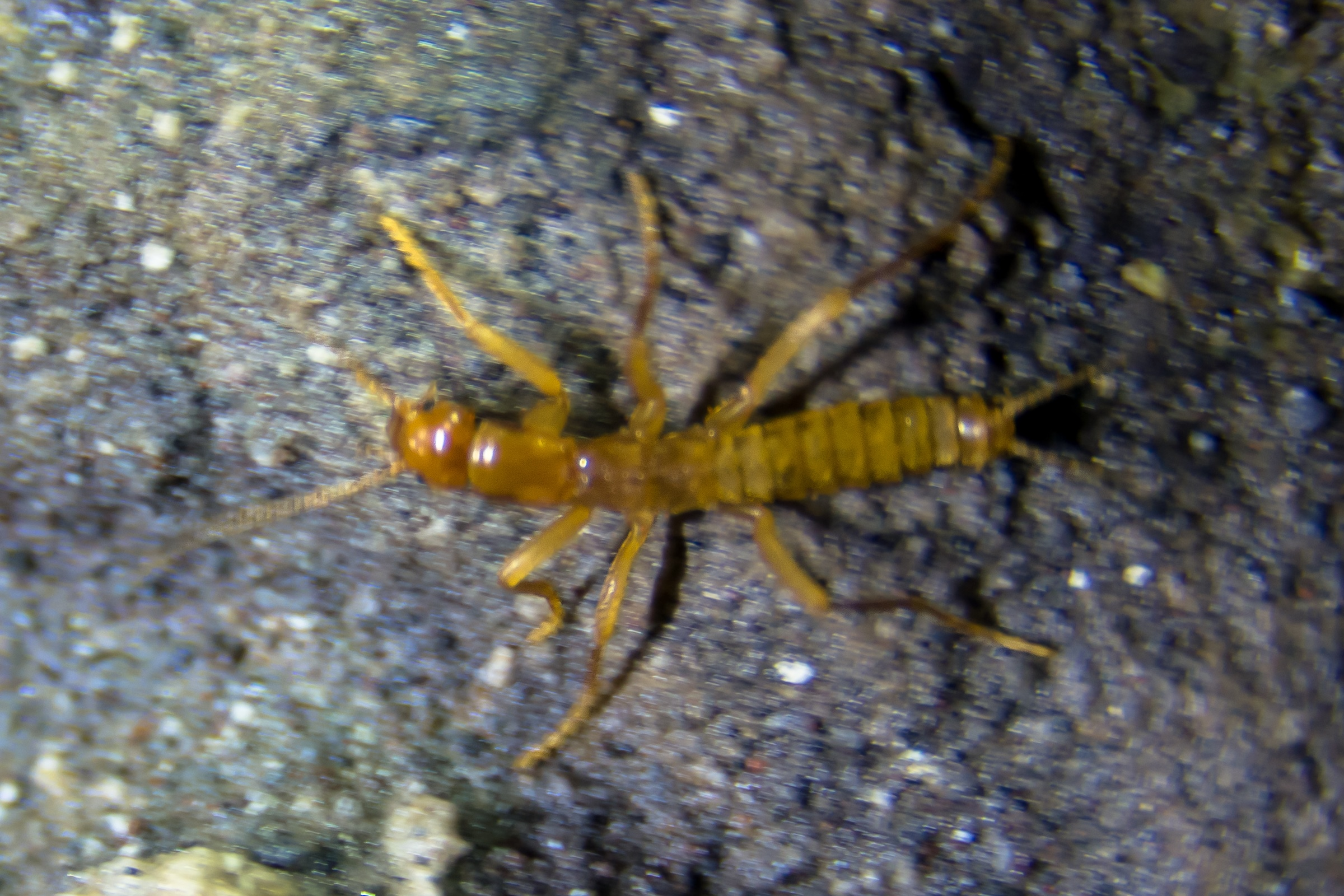

Conservation status
- Vulnerable (IUCN 2.3)

Scientific classification
- Kingdom: Animalia
- Phylum: Arthropoda
- Class: Insecta
- Order: Grylloblattodea
- Family: Grylloblattidae
- Genus: Grylloblatta
- Species: G. chirurgica

Binomial name
- Grylloblatta chirurgica Gurney, 1961

= Grylloblatta chirurgica =

Species of insect

Grylloblatta chirurgica is a species of insect in family Grylloblattidae. Like other species in the genus, it is endemic to the United States. This species is also known as the Mount Saint Helens grylloblatid, and is found at high elevations and in ice caves in south-western Washington state, especially in Skamania County around Mount St. Helens. It has also been found in the Chinook Pass area of Yakima County.
