= Grylloblatta bifratrilecta =

Scientific classification
- Domain: Eukaryota
- Kingdom: Animalia
- Phylum: Arthropoda
- Class: Insecta
- Order: Grylloblattodea
- Family: Grylloblattidae
- Genus: Grylloblatta
- Species: G. bifratrilecta

Binomial name
- Grylloblatta bifratrilecta Gurney, 1953

Species of insect

Grylloblatta bifratrilecta is a species of rock crawler in the family Grylloblattidae. It is found in North America, including Sonora Pass and Carson Pass in the Sierra Nevada.

== Habitat and behavior ==
It lives in crevices at high altitudes, typically above 7,000 feet (2,100 m). It is nocturnal and active mostly during winter months.
