= Marys Peak =

Mountain in Oregon, United States

- chatímanwi
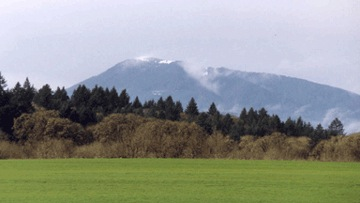
- Marys Peak viewed from the Willamette Valley

Highest point
- Elevation: 4,101 ft (1,250 m) NAVD 88
- Prominence: 3,357 ft (1,023 m)
- Listing: Oregon county high points
- Coordinates: 44°30′16″N 123°33′09″W

Naming
- Native name: chatímanwi (Kalapuya)

Geography
- Location within Oregon Location within the United States
- Location: Benton County, Oregon, U.S.
- Parent range: Central Oregon Coast Range, Oregon Coast Range
- Topo map: USGS Lorane

Climbing
- Easiest route: trail from Marys Peak Road

Marys Peak (formerly Mary's Peak and sometimes still spelled this way) is a mountain in Benton County, Oregon, United States, just southwest of Philomath. The Kalapuya people call the peak "chatímanwi", or 'place of spiritual power'. It is the highest peak in the Oregon Coast Range. It is also the highest point in Benton County, and ranks twelfth in the state for prominence.

On a clear day at the top of the peak, facing east, northeast, and southeast, one can see the cities and suburbs of the Willamette Valley, as well as the Cascade Range. To the west, the Pacific Ocean is visible on clear days.

The road to the peak now remains open in the winter. During the 2010–2011 winter, the Forest Service announced that it will leave the gates open to facilitate travel to the summit. The road will not be maintained, so a lifted 4x4 or four-wheel chains are required for motor access during the winter months.

On June 15, 2019, the Oregon Geographic Names Board unanimously endorsed a proposal to give Native American names to 10 unnamed creeks that flow down Marys Peak. The Confederated Tribes of the Grand Ronde and Confederated Tribes of Siletz Indians were enlisted to be involved in representing the ancient indigenous groups and selecting the new names. The names proposed for adoption are in the languages of the Kalapuya, Wusi’n and Yaqo’n people who originally inhabited the land. The U.S. Board on Geographic Names unanimously approved the 10 names in September 2019, and signs bearing these names were installed in 2025 by the city of Corvallis.

== History ==
The Kalapuya name for Marys Peak is "chatímanwi", sometimes written as "tcha Timanwi" or "chintimini". Kalapuya oral history describes their ancestors climbing the mountain to escape a massive flood. Chatímanwi is an important spiritual site for the Kalapuya. Confederated Tribes of Grand Ronde council member Brenda Tuomi described Marys Peak as "a place that's always been our protector, our provider, a place where our people could come to feel empowered, come to pray, come to heal".

Kalapuya people hunted and fished on Marys Peak. They also harvested beargrass, hazel, and cedar from the mountain for use in clothing and baskets. In 1856, the United States government forcibly removed the southern Kalapuya bands from their homes, including the Marys Peak area.

Early American settlers grazed their livestock on the mountain. In the late 1800s, a community called Peak was founded on the northwest slope of Marys Peak. Peak's post office closed in 1917, and the community is abandoned today.

The name Marys Peak, given by settlers of European ancestry, may have been inspired by Mary Lloyd, who came to Oregon in 1845. Lloyd was known as the first white woman to cross the Marys River, which has its origin on the mountain. However, there are alternate theories about the name.

The city of Corvallis began using the Rock Creek watershed on Marys Peak for its municipal water supply in 1906. As logging operations spread throughout the area, the Corvallis city government bought land in the Rock Creek watershed to preserve its water quality.

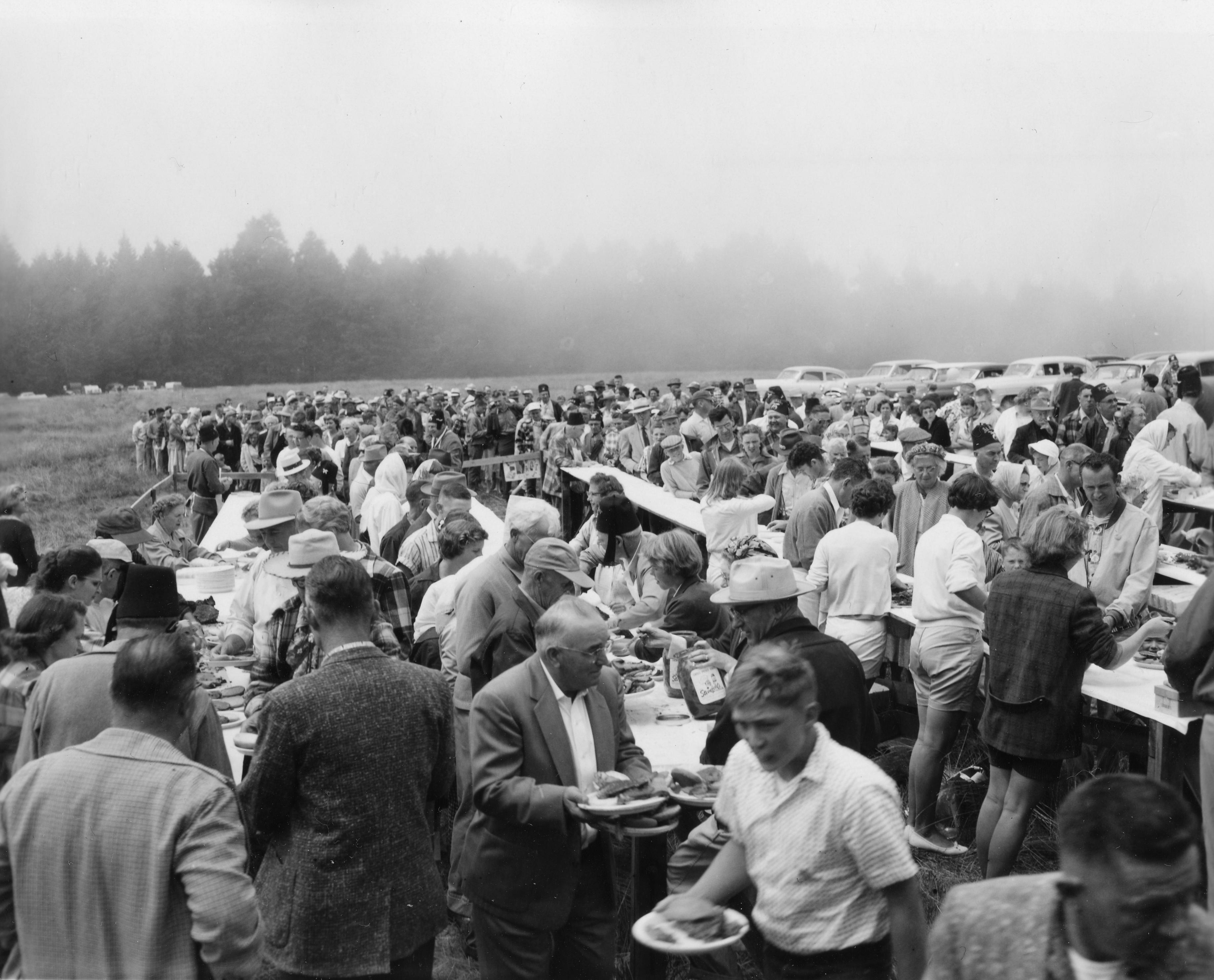
13th Annual Mary's Peak Shrine Trek

From 1946 to 1984, Shriners International held an annual picnic on the summit of Marys Peak to raise money for the Shriners Hospital for Crippled Children (now Shriners Children's Portland). In 1982, a Statesman Journal article reported that the event had raised more than $900,000 since it began. In 1984, poor weather caused the event organizers to move locations.

== Ecology ==
A grassland at the summit of the peak supports diverse wildflower species. The upper slopes are dominated by noble fir, and the lower slopes are dominated by Douglas fir and western hemlock.

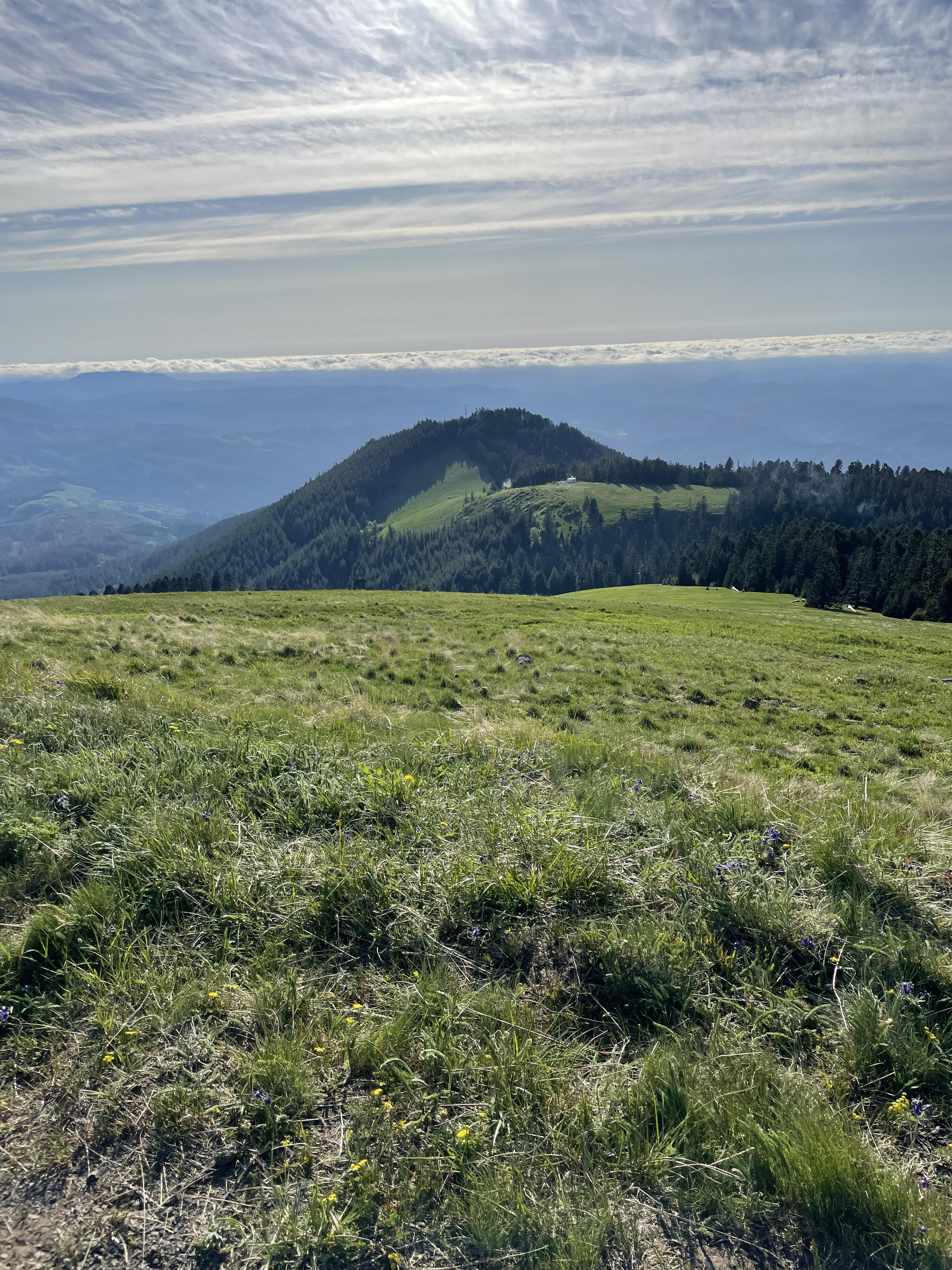
A meadow atop Marys Peak

The meadow contains several outcroppings of gabbro rock, which are often referred to as rock gardens. The most noted of these outcroppings covers four to five acres on a southern slope near the summit. The rock gardens support many wildflowers that grow well on thin, dry soils. These species include Cascade desertparsley, harsh paintbrush, Olympic onion, and spreading phlox.

In 1989, the Forest Service designated a 924-acre area on the upper slopes of Marys Peak as a Scenic Botanical Special Interest Area. This area includes the meadow at the summit, riparian zones, and tracts of noble fir forest.

Beginning in the 1950s or earlier, noble firs have spread into areas of Marys Peak that were once meadow. To preserve the meadow ecosystem, the Forest Service had 3,000 trees removed from 25 acres of land. The trees were harvested by Miller Timber Services, a subcontractor of pulp and paper company Georgia-Pacific. The removal began in the fall of 2015.

In 2015, scientists from Oregon State University identified a type of ice crawler found on Marys Peak as a unique species. It was named Grylloblatta chintimini.
