= Grylloblatta campodeiformis =

Scientific classification
- Domain: Eukaryota
- Kingdom: Animalia
- Phylum: Arthropoda
- Class: Insecta
- Order: Grylloblattodea
- Family: Grylloblattidae
- Genus: Grylloblatta
- Species: G. campodeiformis

Binomial name
- Grylloblatta campodeiformis Walker, 1914

Species of insect

Grylloblatta campodeiformis, also known as the northern rock crawler, is an omnivorous species of insect in family Grylloblattidae. Like other species in the genus Grylloblatta, it is endemic to North America.

== Taxonomy ==
This species was the first grylloblatid discovered and formally described in the scientific literature by Edmund Walker in 1914. It was originally placed in the order Orthoptera but has since been placed in the order Notoptera.

There are currently four subspecies:

- Grylloblatta campodeiformis athapaska Kamp, 1979, recorded in British Columbia, Alberta, and Montana
- Grylloblatta campodeiformis campodeiformis Walker, 1914, recorded in British Columbia
- Grylloblatta campodeiformis nahanni Kamp, 1979, recorded in British Columbia
- Grylloblatta campodeiformis occidentalis Silvestri, 1931, recorded in Washington state, US

== Description ==
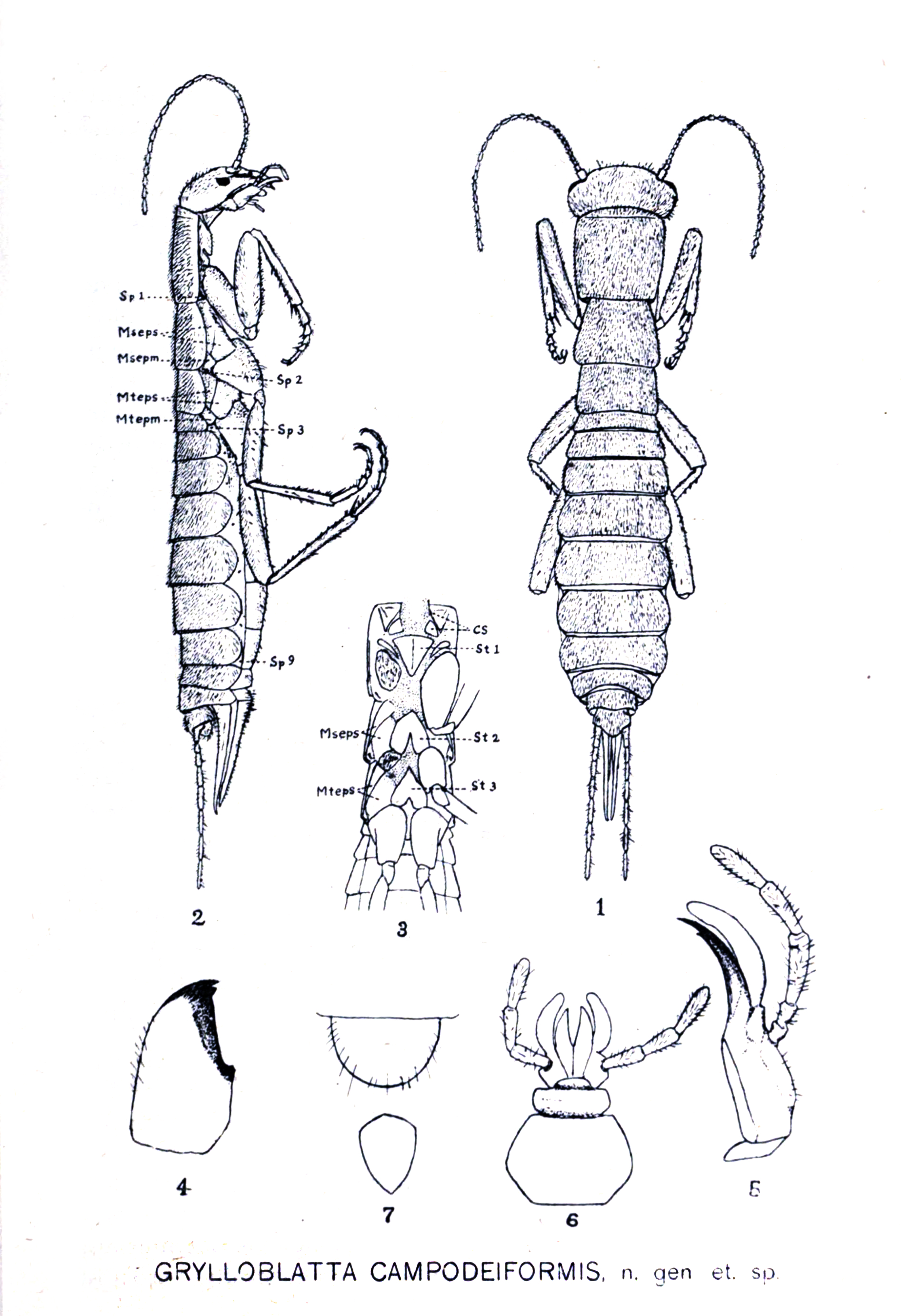
Illustration by Walker (1914)

Adults are typically 3 cm (1.2 in) long, excluding ovipositors and cerci, and are fairly elongate, wingless insects. They are a uniform honey-yellow in colour and covered with very short hair. Unlike some other species of grylloblatid, G. campodeiformis has eyes which have roughly 70 facets. The head is fairly flat and rounded. The thorax is elongate and over a third of the body length. The abdomen is composed of 10 segments and over half the body length. The legs are long and narrow (cursorial) with stout coxae and long femora. Their antennae are long ~9 mm (0.35 in) and thread-like. In adults the number of antennal subsegments is variable ranging from 24 to 27.

== Biology ==
Diet

Rock crawlers are nocturnal predators and scavengers that actively search for small, invertebrate prey. They also venture onto snowfields, foraging for “insect-fallout” carried and deposited there by wind.

== Distribution and habitat ==
This species was originally discovered on Sulphur Mountain, Alberta in the Canadian Rockies at an altitude of 6,500 feet (2,000 m). Subsequently it has been recorded from British Columbia (Canada), Montana, Washington (USA).

They are ground dwelling animals, living between small stones and debris during the day. While they can survive warmer temperatures of up to 20.5 °C (68.9 °F) they are typically nocturnal, becoming active on snow fields at cooler temperatures of around 0 °C (32 °F) making them psychrophilic.

Like other North American grylloblattids, G. campodeiformis is at some risk of extinction due to its habitat requirements and reduced mobility.
