= Pringleophaga kerguelensis =

Scientific classification
- Kingdom: Animalia
- Phylum: Arthropoda
- Clade: Pancrustacea
- Class: Insecta
- Order: Lepidoptera
- Family: Tineidae
- Genus: Pringleophaga
- Species: P. kerguelensis

Binomial name
- Pringleophaga kerguelensis Enderlein, 1905

Species of moth

Pringleophaga kerguelensis is a species of Pringleophaga.

== Description ==
The Pringleophaga kerguelensis is a type of moth found in the Southern Indian Ocean.
