= Grylloblattina =

Scientific classification
- Domain: Eukaryota
- Kingdom: Animalia
- Phylum: Arthropoda
- Class: Insecta
- Order: Grylloblattodea
- Family: Grylloblattidae
- Genus: Grylloblattina; Bey-Bienko 1951
- Species: G. djakonovi

Binomial name
- Grylloblattina djakonovi Bey-Bienko 1951

Genus of insects

Grylloblattina is a genus of insects in the family Grylloblattidae. It is a monotypic genus consisting of the species Grylloblattina djakonovi.

== Range and habitat ==
Grylloblattina djakonovi is endemic to far eastern Russia, where it is found along stream banks in mature forests.

Specimens have been collected on Petrov Island in Kievka Bay, Primorsky Krai, Russia.
