= Grylloblatta siskiyouensis =

Scientific classification
- Kingdom: Animalia
- Phylum: Arthropoda
- Class: Insecta
- Order: Grylloblattodea
- Family: Grylloblattidae
- Genus: Grylloblatta
- Species: G. siskiyouensis

Binomial name
- Grylloblatta siskiyouensis Schoville 2012

Species of insect

Grylloblatta siskiyouensis is a species of insect in the family Grylloblattidae. Its type locality is in Oregon Caves National Monument in the United States.

== Range ==
Although it is currently known only from Oregon Caves National Monument, it may potentially also be found in other areas of the Siskiyou Mountains.

== Habitat ==
It is found in caves and forests.
