= Grylloblatta marmoreus =

Scientific classification
- Kingdom: Animalia
- Phylum: Arthropoda
- Class: Insecta
- Order: Grylloblattodea
- Family: Grylloblattidae
- Genus: Grylloblatta
- Species: G. marmoreus

Binomial name
- Grylloblatta marmoreus (Schoville, 2012)

Species of insect

Grylloblatta marmoreus is a species of cave-dwelling insect in the family Grylloblattidae. Its type locality is in the Marble Mountains of California, United States.

== Entomology ==
G.marmoreus was described from a male found on a rock in Planetary Dairy Cave, and a juvenile in a pit. The male specimen is 125mm long, and buff, while the juvenile is amber.
