= Namkungia biryongensis =

Conservation status
- Endangered (IUCN 3.1)

Scientific classification
- Kingdom: Animalia
- Phylum: Arthropoda
- Class: Insecta
- Order: Grylloblattodea
- Family: Grylloblattidae
- Genus: Namkungia
- Species: N. biryongensis

Binomial name
- Namkungia biryongensis (Namkung, 1974)

Synonyms
- Galloisiana biryongensis Namkung, 1974

Species of insect

Namkungia biryongensis is a species of cave-dwelling insect in the family Grylloblattidae. Its type locality is Biryong Cave in Jeongseon County, Gangwon Province, South Korea.

It was first described in 1974 by Joon Namkung as Galloisiana biryongensis.
