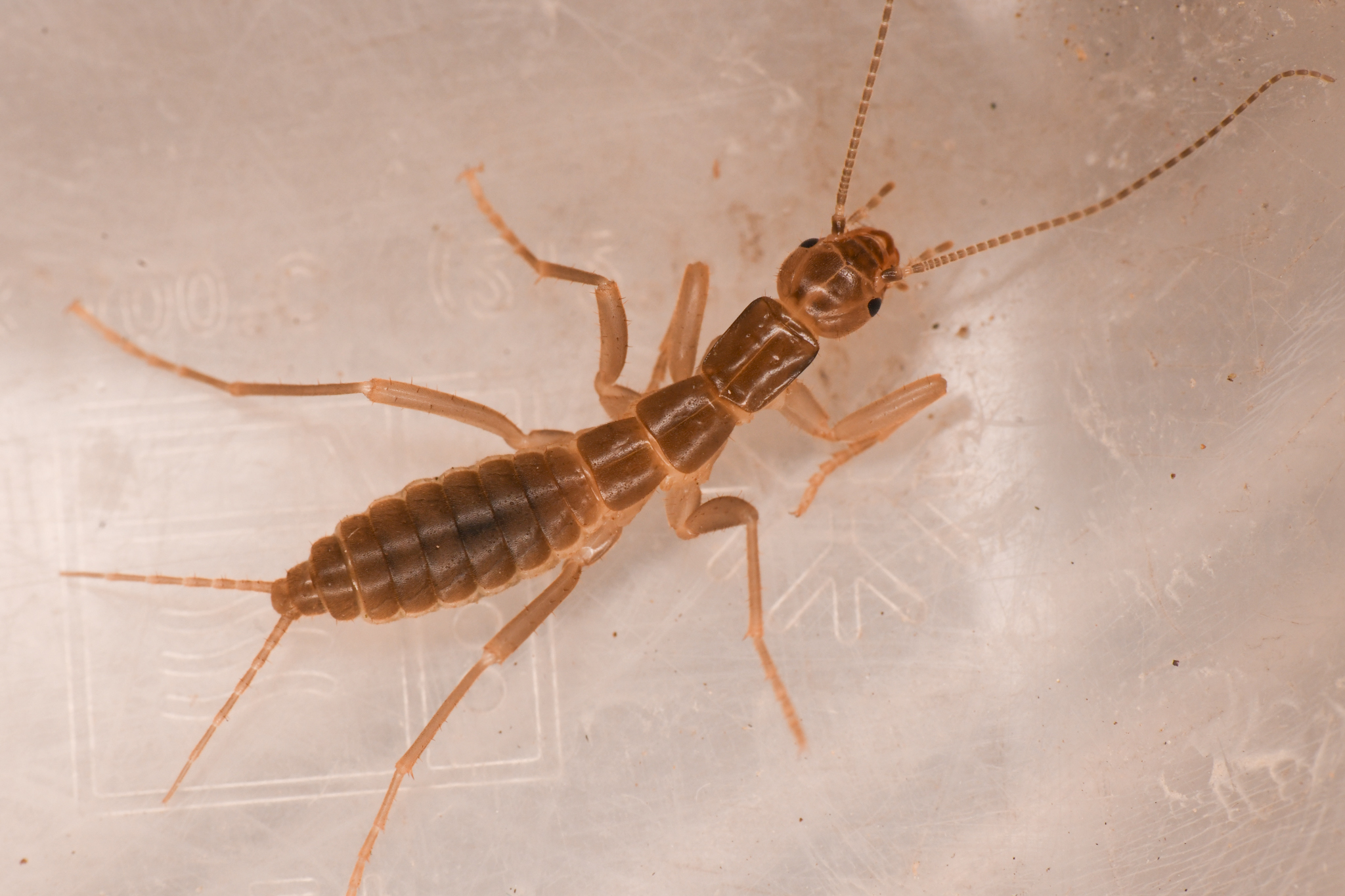

Scientific classification
- Kingdom: Animalia
- Phylum: Arthropoda
- Clade: Pancrustacea
- Class: Insecta
- Order: Grylloblattodea
- Family: Grylloblattidae
- Genus: Grylloblatta
- Species: G. scudderi

Binomial name
- Grylloblatta scudderi Kamp, 1979

= Grylloblatta scudderi =

Species of insect

Grylloblatta scudderi, also known as Scudder's rock crawler, is a species of Grylloblattidae. It was first described in 1979. It is endemic to British Columbia, Canada, and is unranked by NatureServe as of January 2021.

The first specimens were collected from Whistler Mountain in Garibaldi Provincial Park, British Columbia.
