= Caudellia nigrella =

Scientific classification
- Domain: Eukaryota
- Kingdom: Animalia
- Phylum: Arthropoda
- Class: Insecta
- Order: Lepidoptera
- Family: Pyralidae
- Genus: Caudellia
- Species: C. nigrella

Binomial name
- Caudellia nigrella (Hulst, 1890)

Synonyms
- Ephestia nigrella Hulst, 1890; Ephestia arizonella Walter, 1928

Species of moth

Caudellia nigrella is a species of snout moth, family Pyralidae. It was described by George Duryea Hulst in 1890. It is found in North America from northern Mexico through the United States (Texas, Arizona, Nevada, California) to Alberta, Canada.
