= Chalcosicya =

Scientific classification
- Kingdom: Animalia
- Phylum: Arthropoda
- Clade: Pancrustacea
- Class: Insecta
- Order: Coleoptera
- Suborder: Polyphaga
- Infraorder: Cucujiformia
- Family: Chrysomelidae
- Subfamily: Eumolpinae
- Tribe: Bromiini
- Genus: Chalcosicya; Blake, 1930

Type species
- Chalcosicya maestrensis Blake, 1930

Genus of leaf beetles from the West Indies and Mexico

Chalcosicya is a genus of leaf beetles in the subfamily Eumolpinae. It is mainly known from the West Indies, though one species is found in southern Mexico. It has recently been thought to be a sister genus to the Mediterranean Colaspidea, with Colaspina as a sister genus to the former two combined.

The genus was first erected by the American entomologist Doris Holmes Blake in 1930 for a single new species from Cuba. In subsequent publications by Blake, she described more than 20 additional species of the genus from various islands in the West Indies. In 2012, a species of Chalcosicya was described from southern Mexico by R. Wills Flowers, expanding the range of the genus to the mainland of North America.

Beetles in the genus are small in size (less than 4 mm) and have a robust, ovate body. They have a black, dark bronze, green or blue color, and are covered in scale-like hairs or setae.

== Species ==
- Chalcosicya acuminata Blake, 1951 – Dominican Republic
- Chalcosicya alayoi Blake, 1960 – Cuba
- Chalcosicya androsensis Blake, 1965 Bahamas (Andros Island)
- Chalcosicya aptera Blake, 1951 – Dominican Republic
- Chalcosicya constanzae Blake, 1951 – Dominican Republic
- Chalcosicya convexa Blake, 1951 – Dominican Republic
- Chalcosicya crotonis (Fabricius, 1792) – Puerto Rico
  - Chalcosicya crotonis var. acuta Blake, 1951
  - Chalcosicya crotonis var. angularis Blake, 1951
  - Chalcosicya crotonis var. parguerensis Blake, 1951
  - Chalcosicya crotonis var. septentrionalis Blake, 1951
- Chalcosicya darlingtoni Blake, 1951 – Dominican Republic
- Chalcosicya ditrichota Blake, 1938 – Cuba
- Chalcosicya eleutherae Blake, 1951 – Bahamas (Eleuthera)
- Chalcosicya farri Blake, 1966 – Jamaica
- Chalcosicya fraterna Blake, 1951 – Dominican Republic
- Chalcosicya gemina Blake, 1951 – Dominican Republic
- Chalcosicya glabra Blake, 1951 – Dominican Republic
- Chalcosicya grandis Blake, 1951 – Guadeloupe
- Chalcosicya humeralis Blake, 1971 – Dominican Republic
- Chalcosicya insularis (Blatchley, 1922) – Isla de la Juventud
- Chalcosicya maestrensis Blake, 1930 – Cuba
- Chalcosicya maya Flowers, 2012 – Mexico
- Chalcosicya nana (Suffrian, 1866) – Cuba
- Chalcosicya parsoni Blake, 1951 – Cuba
- Chalcosicya parvula Blake, 1951 – Dominican Republic
- Chalcosicya plana Blake, 1951 – Antigua
- Chalcosicya rotundata Blake, 1938 – Cuba
- Chalcosicya semicostata Blake, 1951 – Cuba
- Chalcosicya senilis Blake, 1951 – Dominican Republic
- Chalcosicya setosella Blake, 1971 – Dominican Republic
- Chalcosicya teres Blake, 1951 – Dominican Republic
- Chalcosicya truncata Blake, 1951 – Dominican Republic
- Chalcosicya villosa Blake, 1951 – Dominican Republic

Synonyms:

- Chalcosicya costata Blake, 1938 is a synonym of Chalcosicya insularis (Blatchley, 1922)
