= Grylloblatta chandleri =

Scientific classification
- Domain: Eukaryota
- Kingdom: Animalia
- Phylum: Arthropoda
- Class: Insecta
- Order: Grylloblattodea
- Family: Grylloblattidae
- Genus: Grylloblatta
- Species: G. chandleri

Binomial name
- Grylloblatta chandleri Kamp 1963

Species of insect

Grylloblatta chandleri is a species of insect in the family Grylloblattidae. Its type locality is an ice cave in Eagle Lake in California, United States.

It has also been recorded in Shasta County (North Christmas Tree Cave) and Tehama County (Wilson Lake Ice Cave, Mount Lassen).
