= Caudellia colorella =

Scientific classification
- Kingdom: Animalia
- Phylum: Arthropoda
- Class: Insecta
- Order: Lepidoptera
- Family: Pyralidae
- Genus: Caudellia
- Species: C. colorella

Binomial name
- Caudellia colorella (Dyar, 1914)

Synonyms
- Ephestia colorella Dyar, 1914

Species of moth

Caudellia colorella is a species of snout moth in the genus Caudellia. It was described by Harrison Gray Dyar Jr., in 1914, and is known from Panama.
