= Grylloblatta rothi =

Scientific classification
- Kingdom: Animalia
- Phylum: Arthropoda
- Class: Insecta
- Order: Grylloblattodea
- Family: Grylloblattidae
- Genus: Grylloblatta
- Species: G. rothi

Binomial name
- Grylloblatta rothi Gurney 1953

Species of insect

Grylloblatta rothi is a species of insect in the family Grylloblattidae found in Oregon. Its type locality is Happy Valley in Deschutes County, Oregon, United States. It is also known from Mount Hood and Crater Lake.
