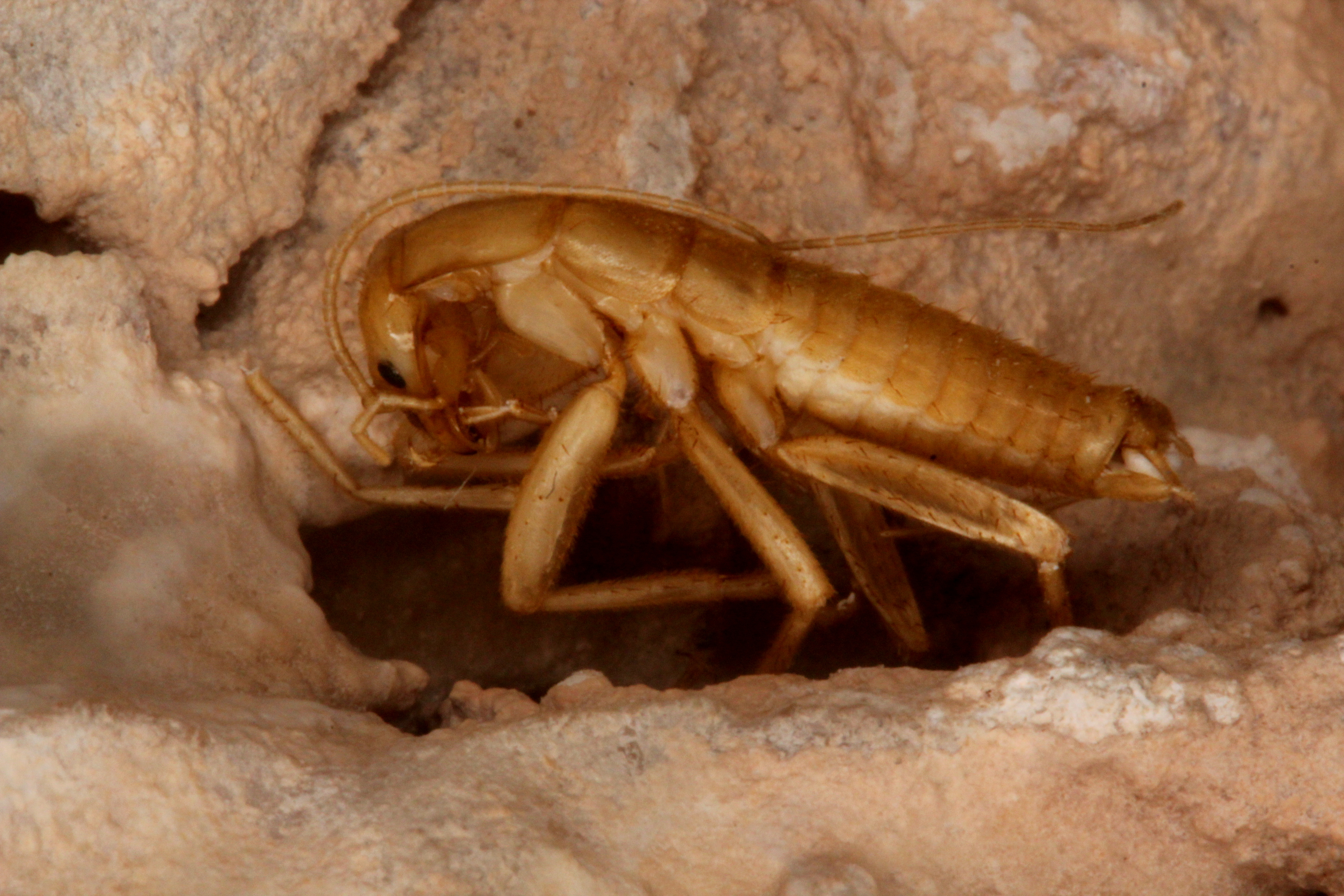

Scientific classification
- Kingdom: Animalia
- Phylum: Arthropoda
- Class: Insecta
- Order: Grylloblattodea
- Family: Grylloblattidae
- Genus: Grylloblatta
- Species: G. oregonensis

Binomial name
- Grylloblatta oregonensis Schoville 2012

= Grylloblatta oregonensis =

Species of insect

Grylloblatta oregonensis is a species of insect in the family Grylloblattidae. Its type locality is in Oregon Caves National Monument in the United States.
