= Caudellia pilosa =

Scientific classification
- Domain: Eukaryota
- Kingdom: Animalia
- Phylum: Arthropoda
- Class: Insecta
- Order: Lepidoptera
- Family: Pyralidae
- Genus: Caudellia
- Species: C. pilosa

Binomial name
- Caudellia pilosa Neunzig, 1996

Species of moth

Caudellia pilosa is a species of snout moth in the genus Caudellia. It was described by Herbert H. Neunzig in 2006 and is known from the Dominican Republic.
