= Colaspidea ovulum =

Scientific classification
- Kingdom: Animalia
- Phylum: Arthropoda
- Clade: Pancrustacea
- Class: Insecta
- Order: Coleoptera
- Suborder: Polyphaga
- Infraorder: Cucujiformia
- Family: Chrysomelidae
- Genus: Colaspidea
- Species: C. ovulum

Binomial name
- Colaspidea ovulum Fairmaire, 1866

Species of beetle

Colaspidea ovulum is a species of leaf beetle of Tunisia and Algeria described by Léon Fairmaire in 1866.
