= Colaspidea smaragdula =

Scientific classification
- Kingdom: Animalia
- Phylum: Arthropoda
- Clade: Pancrustacea
- Class: Insecta
- Order: Coleoptera
- Suborder: Polyphaga
- Infraorder: Cucujiformia
- Family: Chrysomelidae
- Genus: Colaspidea
- Species: C. smaragdula

Binomial name
- Colaspidea smaragdula (LeConte, 1857)

Synonyms
- Eumolpus smaragdulus LeConte, 1857; Eumolpus cuprascens LeConte, 1858; Glyptoscelis varicolor Crotch, 1874; Colaspidea subvittata Fall, 1897; Colaspidea grata Fall, 1933

Species of beetle

Colaspidea smaragdula is a species of leaf beetle. It is found in North America.
