= Grylloblatta chintimini =

Scientific classification
- Domain: Eukaryota
- Kingdom: Animalia
- Phylum: Arthropoda
- Class: Insecta
- Order: Grylloblattodea
- Family: Grylloblattidae
- Genus: Grylloblatta
- Species: G. chintimini

Binomial name
- Grylloblatta chintimini Marshall & Lytle, 2015

Species of insect

Grylloblatta chintimini is a species of rock crawler in the family Grylloblattidae. It is found in the state of Oregon in the United States.

Its type locality is Marys Peak in Oregon.
