= Colaspidea grossa =

Scientific classification
- Kingdom: Animalia
- Phylum: Arthropoda
- Clade: Pancrustacea
- Class: Insecta
- Order: Coleoptera
- Suborder: Polyphaga
- Infraorder: Cucujiformia
- Family: Chrysomelidae
- Genus: Colaspidea
- Species: C. grossa

Binomial name
- Colaspidea grossa Fairmaire, 1866

Species of beetle

Colaspidea grossa is a species of beetle in the Chrysomelidae family, that can be found in North Africa particularly in Morocco and Southern Spain.
