= Namkungia magna =

Conservation status
- Vulnerable (IUCN 3.1)

Scientific classification
- Kingdom: Animalia
- Phylum: Arthropoda
- Class: Insecta
- Order: Grylloblattodea
- Family: Grylloblattidae
- Genus: Namkungia
- Species: N. magna

Binomial name
- Namkungia magna (Namkung, 1986)

Synonyms
- Galloisiana magnus Namkung, 1986

Species of insect

Namkungia magna (formerly Galloisiana magnus) is a species of cave-dwelling insect in the family Grylloblattidae. Its type locality is Balgudeok Cave in Jeongseon County, Gangwon Province, South Korea.

== Description ==
Namkungia magna is a large, wingless grylloblattid adapted to cold, dark cave environments. It has an elongated body, long antennae, and sensory adaptations for navigating subterranean habitats. Its size is notable within the Grylloblattidae family, making it one of the largest ice bugs described.

== Distribution and habitat ==
This species is endemic to the Korean Peninsula, specifically recorded in Balgudeok Cave. It inhabits stable, low-light, and cool cave environments where it avoids the temperature extremes and predation pressures of surface habitats.

== Ecology ==
Like other members of Grylloblattidae, N. magna is presumed to be omnivorous or detritivorous, feeding on decomposing plant material, fungi, and possibly smaller invertebrates within the cave ecosystem. Grylloblattids are known for slow development and long lifespans, traits that suit the stable but resource-limited cave environment.

== Conservation ==
Due to its restricted range and highly specialized habitat, Namkungia magna is considered vulnerable. Disturbances to cave systems, including human intrusion and environmental changes, pose significant threats to its survival.
