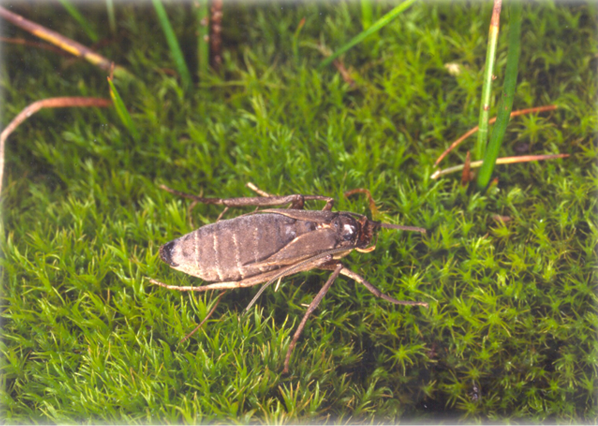
- Pringleophaga marioni

Scientific classification
- Kingdom: Animalia
- Phylum: Arthropoda
- Clade: Pancrustacea
- Class: Insecta
- Order: Lepidoptera
- Family: Tineidae
- Subfamily: Tineinae
- Genus: Pringleophaga

Species
- Pringleophaga crozetensis Enderlein, 1905; Pringleophaga kerguelensis Enderlein, 1905; Pringleophaga marioni Viette, 1968

= Pringleophaga =

Genus of moths

Pringleophaga is a genus of moths belonging to the family Tineidae.
