= Grylloblattella sayanensis =

Scientific classification
- Kingdom: Animalia
- Phylum: Arthropoda
- Class: Insecta
- Order: Grylloblattodea
- Family: Grylloblattidae
- Genus: Grylloblattella
- Species: G. sayanensis

Binomial name
- Grylloblattella sayanensis Storozhenko 1996

Species of insect

Grylloblattella sayanensis is a species of insect in the family Grylloblattidae found in the Sayan Mountains of Russia. Its type locality is Sambyl Pass in Siberian Russia.
