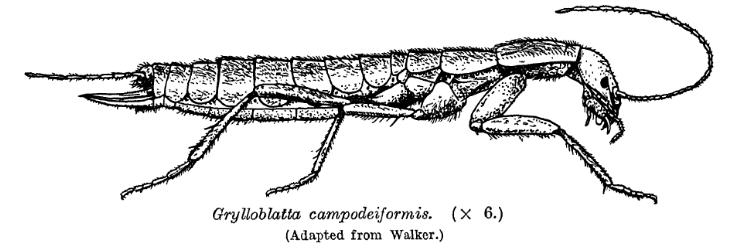
- Grylloblatta campodeiformis

Scientific classification
- Kingdom: Animalia
- Phylum: Arthropoda
- Class: Insecta
- Order: Grylloblattodea
- Family: Grylloblattidae
- Genus: Grylloblatta; Walker, 1914

Species
- 15 species

= Grylloblatta =

Genus of insects

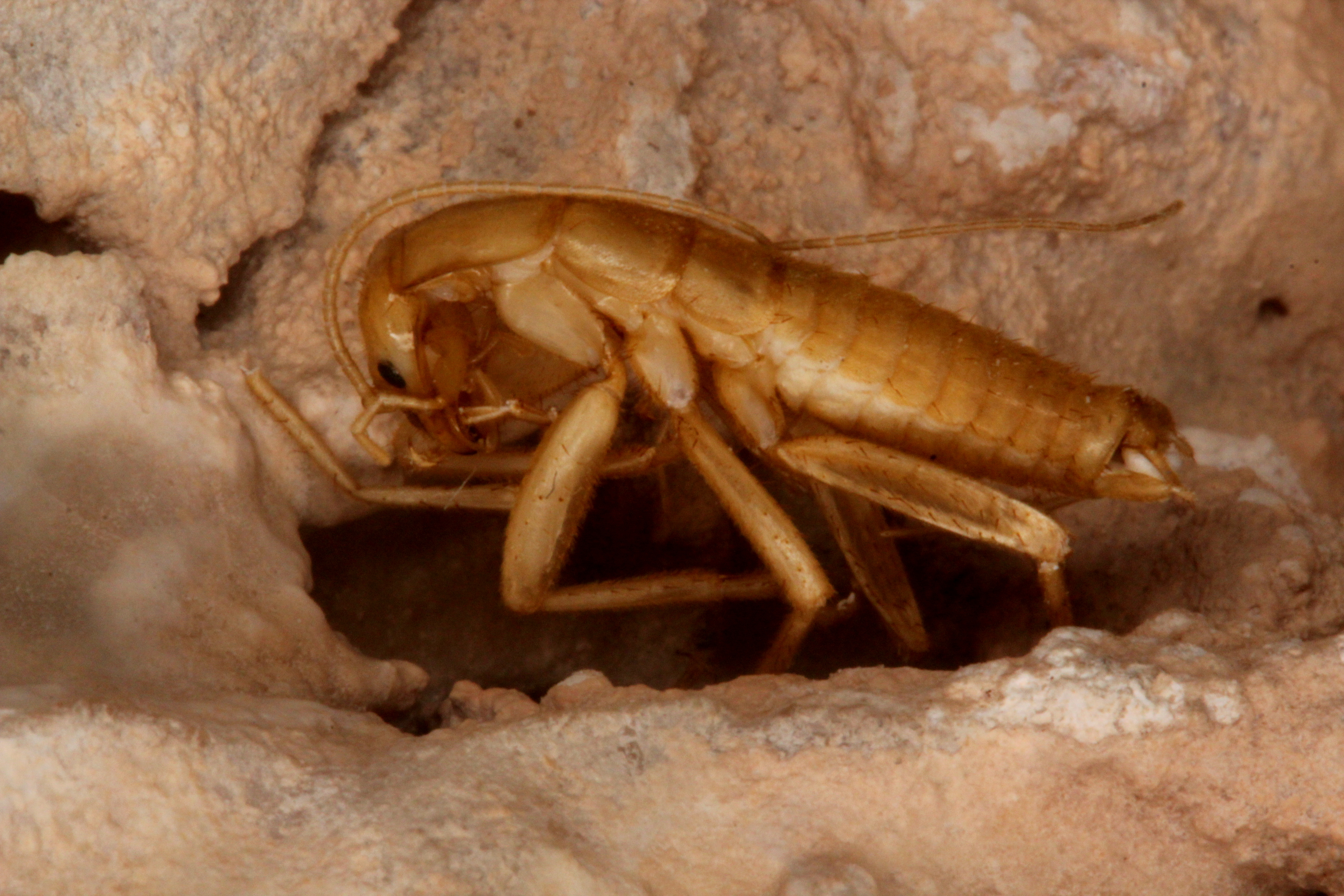
Grylloblatta oregonensis

Grylloblatta is a genus of insects in the family Grylloblattidae. It contains 15 species, including Grylloblatta chirurgica, almost exclusively from high-altitude and high-latitude regions of the United States and Canada, living in ice caves and glaciers.

The genus was first described by Edmund Walker in 1914, based on a single species, Grylloblatta campodeiformis.

== Species ==
These 15 species belong to the genus Grylloblatta:

- Grylloblatta barberi Caudell, 1924^{i c g}
- Grylloblatta bifratrilecta Gurney, 1953^{i c g b}
- Grylloblatta campodeiformis E. M. Walker, 1914^{i c g b} (northern rock crawler)
- Grylloblatta chandleri Kamp, 1963^{i c g}
- Grylloblatta chintimini Marshall & Lytle, 2015^{i c g b}
- Grylloblatta chirurgica Gurney, 1961^{i c g b} (Mount St Helens' grylloblattid)
- Grylloblatta gurneyi Kamp, 1963^{i c g}
- Grylloblatta marmoreus Schoville, 2012^{i c g}
- Grylloblatta newberryensis Marshall and Lytle, 2015^{i c g}
- Grylloblatta oregonensis Schoville, 2012^{i c g}
- Grylloblatta rothi Gurney, 1953^{i c g}
- Grylloblatta scudderi Kamp, 1979^{i c g}
- Grylloblatta sculleni Gurney, 1937^{i c g}
- Grylloblatta siskiyouensis Schoville, 2012^{i c g}
- Grylloblatta washoa Gurney, 1961^{i c g}

Data sources: i = ITIS, c = Catalogue of Life, g = GBIF, b = Bugguide.net

=== Novel species ===
Based on further evidence, Schoville & Graening (2013) indicate the following can be unique lineages, perhaps undescribed species.

- Grylloblatta sp. "South Ice Cave" – Deschutes County
- Grylloblatta sp. "Glacier Peak"
- Grylloblatta sp. "Mount Rainier"
- Grylloblatta sp. "Sawyer's Ice Cave 1" – Linn County and Yakima County
- Grylloblatta sp. "Sawyer's Ice Cave 2" – Linn County
- Grylloblatta sp. "Trout Lake Caves" – Klickitat County
- Grylloblatta sp. "Central Sierra Nevada" – Sixty Lake Basin, Fresno County
- Grylloblatta sp. "Tioga Crest" – Yosemite National Park and Inyo National Forest
- Grylloblatta sp. "Graveyard Lake" – Sierra National Forest
- Grylloblatta sp. "Ostrander Lake" – Yosemite National Park
- Grylloblatta sp. "Southwest Sierra Nevada" – Sequoia National Park and environs
- Grylloblatta sp. "Lilburn cave" – Sequoia National Park
- Grylloblatta sp. "Trinity Mountains" – Shasta–Trinity National Forest
- Grylloblatta sp. "Olympic Mountains" – Olympic National Forest, near The Brothers
- Grylloblatta sp. "Mount Spokane"
- Grylloblatta sp. "Polaris Peak" – Coeur d'Alene National Forest

== Life cycle ==
Individuals have lifespans of between 6 and 10 years.
