= Caudellia =

Scientific classification
- Kingdom: Animalia
- Phylum: Arthropoda
- Class: Insecta
- Order: Lepidoptera
- Family: Pyralidae
- Subfamily: Phycitinae
- Genus: Caudellia; Dyar, 1904

Genus of moths

Caudellia is a genus of snout moths. It was described by Harrison Gray Dyar Jr. in 1904, honoring his colleague Andrew Nelson Caudell.

== Species ==
- Caudellia apyrella (Dyar, 1904)
- Caudellia colorella (Dyar, 1914)
- Caudellia declivella (Zeller, 1881)
- Caudellia floridensis Neunzig, 1990
- Caudellia galapagosensis Landry & Neunzig, 2006
- Caudellia nigrella (Hulst, 1890)
- Caudellia pilosa Neunzig, 2006
