= Colaspidea inflata =

Scientific classification
- Kingdom: Animalia
- Phylum: Arthropoda
- Clade: Pancrustacea
- Class: Insecta
- Order: Coleoptera
- Suborder: Polyphaga
- Infraorder: Cucujiformia
- Family: Chrysomelidae
- Genus: Colaspidea
- Species: C. inflata

Binomial name
- Colaspidea inflata Lefèvre, 1876

Species of beetle

Colaspidea inflata is a species of leaf beetle of Algeria, described by Édouard Lefèvre in 1876.
