= Caudellia declivella =

Scientific classification
- Kingdom: Animalia
- Phylum: Arthropoda
- Clade: Pancrustacea
- Class: Insecta
- Order: Lepidoptera
- Family: Pyralidae
- Genus: Caudellia
- Species: C. declivella

Binomial name
- Caudellia declivella (Zeller, 1881)

Synonyms
- Ephestia declivella Zeller, 1881; Ephestia animosella Dyar, 1914

Species of moth

Caudellia declivella is a species of snout moth in the genus Caudellia. It was described by Philipp Christoph Zeller in 1881, and is known from Panama and Colombia.
