= Grylloblattella pravdini =

Scientific classification
- Kingdom: Animalia
- Phylum: Arthropoda
- Class: Insecta
- Order: Grylloblattodea
- Family: Grylloblattidae
- Genus: Grylloblattella
- Species: G. pravdini

Binomial name
- Grylloblattella pravdini (Storozhenko & Oliger 1984)

Species of insect

Grylloblattella pravdini is a species of insect in the family Grylloblattidae. Its type locality is Teletskoye Lake, Altai Republic, Russia.

== Habitat ==
It can be found alongside rocky stream banks and in talus fields.
