= Grylloblatta washoa =

Scientific classification
- Kingdom: Animalia
- Phylum: Arthropoda
- Class: Insecta
- Order: Grylloblattodea
- Family: Grylloblattidae
- Genus: Grylloblatta
- Species: G. washoa

Binomial name
- Grylloblatta washoa Gurney 1961

Species of insect

Grylloblatta washoa is a species of insect in the family Grylloblattidae. Its type locality is Echo Summit in the Sierra Nevada of California, United States. Specimens have also been collected in Placer County and Nevada County.
