= Grylloblatta sculleni =

Scientific classification
- Domain: Eukaryota
- Kingdom: Animalia
- Phylum: Arthropoda
- Class: Insecta
- Order: Grylloblattodea
- Family: Grylloblattidae
- Genus: Grylloblatta
- Species: G. sculleni

Binomial name
- Grylloblatta sculleni Gurney 1937

Species of insect

Grylloblatta sculleni is a species of insect in the family Grylloblattidae that is found in Oregon, United States. Its type locality is Scott Camp in Deschutes County, Oregon, United States.
