= Colaspidea globosa =

Scientific classification
- Kingdom: Animalia
- Phylum: Arthropoda
- Clade: Pancrustacea
- Class: Insecta
- Order: Coleoptera
- Suborder: Polyphaga
- Infraorder: Cucujiformia
- Family: Chrysomelidae
- Genus: Colaspidea
- Species: C. globosa

Binomial name
- Colaspidea globosa (Küster, 1848)

Synonyms
- Colaspidea abbreviata Desbrochers des Loges, 1871; Dia globata L. Redtenbacher, 1858; Pachnephorus globosa Küster, 1848

Species of beetle

Colaspidea globosa is a species of beetle in the Chrysomelidae family that can be found in France, Spain, on the island of Sicily, and North Africa.
