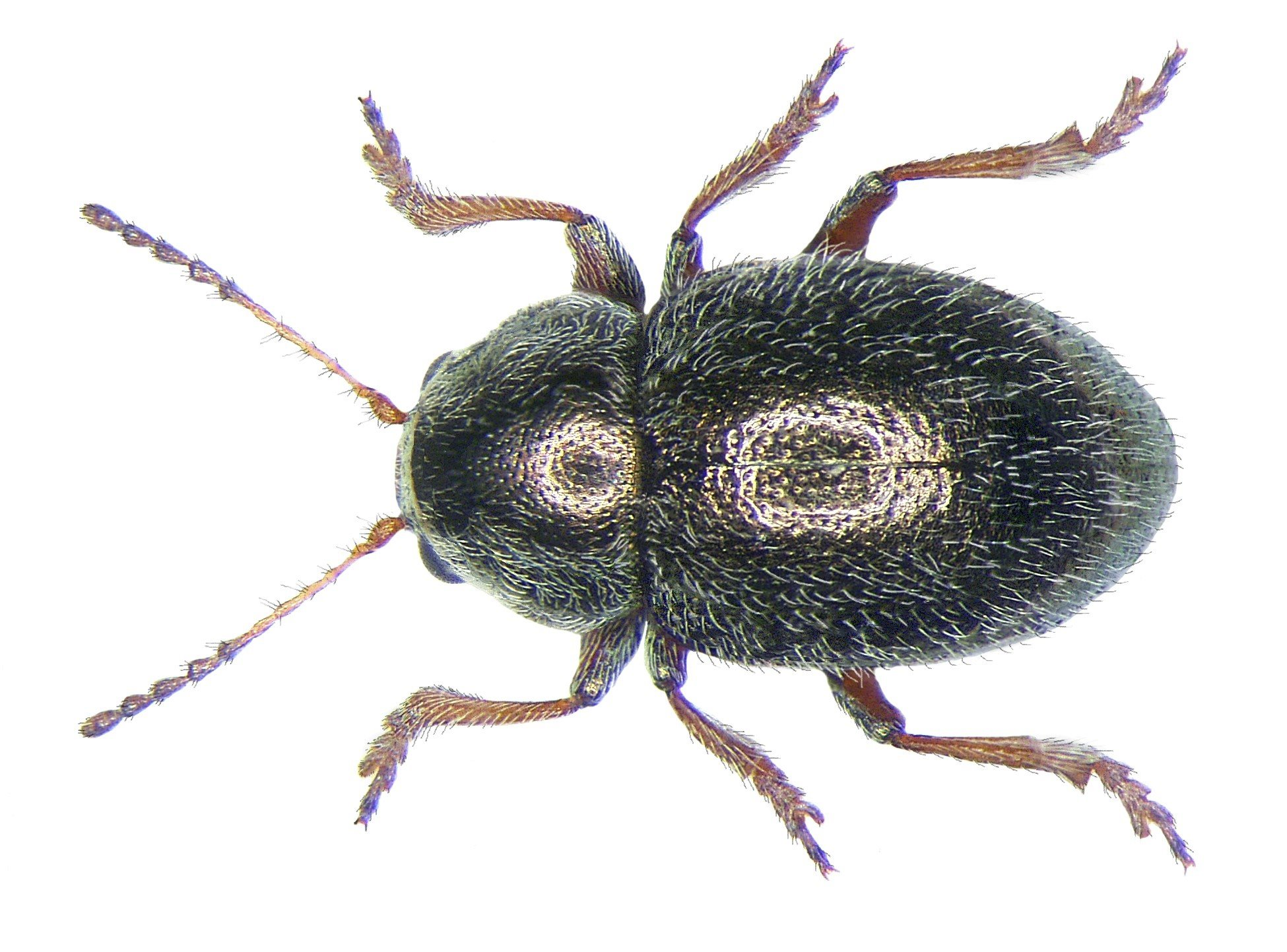

Scientific classification
- Kingdom: Animalia
- Phylum: Arthropoda
- Clade: Pancrustacea
- Class: Insecta
- Order: Coleoptera
- Suborder: Polyphaga
- Infraorder: Cucujiformia
- Family: Chrysomelidae
- Genus: Colaspidea
- Species: C. oblonga

Binomial name
- Colaspidea oblonga (Blanchard, 1855)

Synonyms
- Colaspidea nitida H. Lucas, 1846; Colaspidea oblonga (Fairmaire, 1862); Colaspidea oblonga albanica Schatzmayr, 1923; Dia oblonga Blanchard, 1855; Dia oblonga Fairmaire, 1862

= Colaspidea oblonga =

Species of beetle

Colaspidea oblonga is a species of beetle in the family Chrysomelidae that can be found on Balearic Islands and Crete. It can also be found in such European countries as France, Germany, and the Italian islands of Corsica, Sardinia, and Sicily (including the mainland). Besides the central European countries, it can also be found in all states of former Yugoslavia, except for North Macedonia, and in Tunisia.
