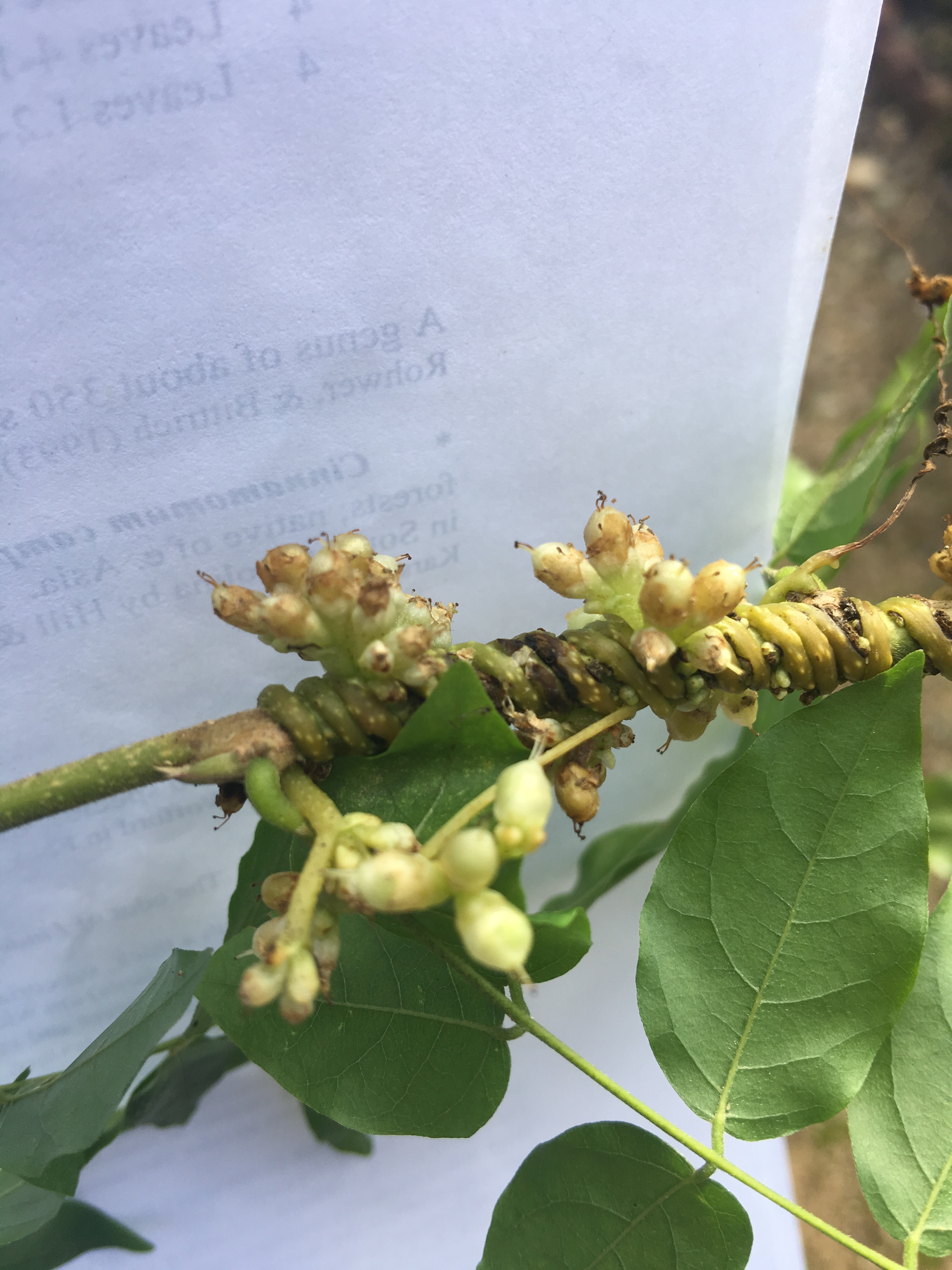

Scientific classification
- Kingdom: Plantae
- Clade: Tracheophytes
- Clade: Angiosperms
- Clade: Eudicots
- Clade: Asterids
- Order: Solanales
- Family: Convolvulaceae
- Genus: Cuscuta
- Species: C. compacta

Binomial name
- Cuscuta compacta Juss. ex Choisy

= Cuscuta compacta =

Species of flowering plant

Cuscuta compacta, the compact dodder, is a parasitic plant that specializes on woody plants. This species is distributed across the Eastern and Midwestern USA, Eastern Canada, and Mexico.

== Introduction ==
Cuscuta compacta is also known as compact dodder or flower love vine. The range of this parasitic plant extends from eastern Canada, the eastern and Midwestern USA to Canada. It is very common in southern Alabama and other southeastern U.S. states.

== Description ==
The plant Cuscuta compacta is known as stem parasite with a yellowish stem that wraps around a host plant. The flowers on this plant are very small. The flowers are small and occur from clusters of four to five. The flowers have a tube or cylinder form with a size of 5mm long and 2mm wide. The sepals of the flower have obtuse tips. The corolla tips on C. compacta gradually acuminate to a sharp point. The length of the stamens are 0.3mm long and is exerted. The style of the pistil is 0.5 mm long. Scales on C. compacta are shorter than the corolla tube. Capsules are tubular in shape with a length of 3mm long and width of 2mm wide. The seeds of C. compacta are 2mm in length and are brown when fresh.

== Taxonomy ==
The species Cuscuta compacta Juss. ex Choisy has four accepted synonyms or subspecific varieties. Synonyms are alternative names for a species. Some names attributed to Cuscuta compacta are Cuscuta compacta var. adpressa (Engelm.) Engelm, Cuscuta fruticum Bertol, Cuscuta glomerata var. adpressa (Engelm.) Choisy, and Lepidanche adpressa Engelm. The Cuscutaceae family is closely related to the Oncothecaceae family on an Angiosperm Phylogeny. C. compacta is in the Cleistogrammica section subsection Lepidanche. Two closest species related to C. compacta are, Cuscuta glomerata and Cuscuta denticulata.

== Distribution and habitat ==
The species Cuscuta compacta can be particularly found in the lower 48 states including Canada. The genus Cuscuta compacta has been identified in Africa, Europe, South America, China, and Australia. Cuscuta compacta can be seen wrapped around their host plants during the months of July through November. Its habitat consists of bottomland forests near stream banks. Other locations are marshes, swamps, and any wet habitats. Cuscuta compacta can parasitize both herbaceous and but especially specialize on woody hosts. Cuscuta is highly diverse being found all over the world yet majority of this genus is in the Americas.

== Parasitism ==
C. compacta is a heterotrophic parasitic plant meaning they attach themselves around other plants and remove their nutrients. As compact dodders age over time, it does not grow any roots. Instead of growing roots, it produces a slender shoot that develops into tendrils. Although it takes time, the tendrils begin to bend and move in different directions until it has attached itself to a host. In a controlled lab environment Cuscuta compacta can attach itself to many host at one time. Yet in the wild, this species C. compacta appears to be more selective for hosts.

== Germination ==
Germination occurs when the embryo begins to grow and bursts from the seed coat. Then the process begins only after the seed absorbs water. The embryo then starts to use the stored food to grow and develop the radicle facing the [null ground][l1]. In order for Cuscuta compacta to germinate the ambient temperature needs to be 22 C to 23 C (71.6 F to 73.4 F).

== Economic impact ==
In North Carolina blueberry growers have reported Cuscuta compacta as an agronomic pest. Notably, C. compacta specializes on woody hosts such as blueberry bushes (Vaccinium spp.) The multiple basal shoots on blueberry bushes may facilitates parasitism by C. compacta. Ditches associated with wetlands may be responsible for Cuscuta seed dispersal or possibly birds.

== Hosts ==
Cuscuta compacta uses herbaceous hosts but specializes on woody or semi-woody plants. Reported hosts of C. compacta: Acer, Alnus, Amelopsis, Apios, Aster, Baccharis, Bignonia, Boehmeria, Campsis, Carpinus, Cephalanthus, Cyrilla, Diespyrus, Elephatopus, Eupatorium, Gelsemium, Halesia, Hypericum, Ilex, Idea, Iva, Lespedeza, Leucotboe, Ludwigia, Myrica, Nyssa, Rubus, Sambucus, Sapium, Sassafras, Saururus, Smilax, Vaccinium, Viburnum.
