= Biryong Cave =

Limestone cave in Jeongseon, South Korea

Jeongseon Biryong Cave
- Korean: 정선 비룡굴
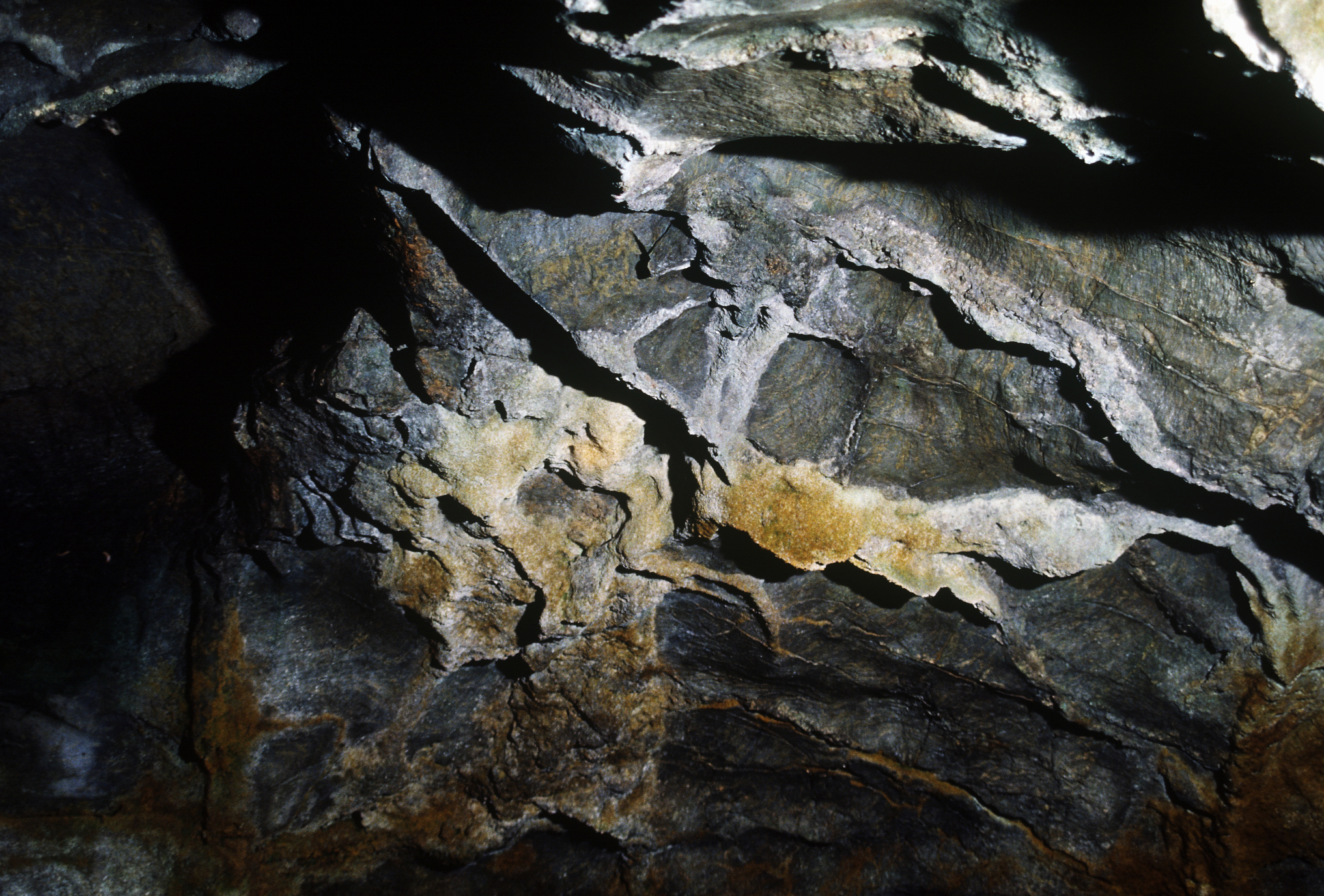

- Location within South Korea
- Location: Jeongseon-gun, Gangwon-do
- Coordinates: 37.4202487°N 128.6134464°E
- Established: 1980
- Governing body: Jeongseon County

Jeongseon Biryong Cave (Korean: 정선 비룡굴), is a limestone cave in Jeongseon County (Gangwon Province), South Korea. The cave has total length of 1.2 km and was first discovered in March 1966.

There is no running water within the cave, and hence within it, stalagmites and stalactites are rare. it has almost stopped growing, and artificial pollution and damage are serious. Consequently, access is controlled.

It was designated a natural monument of Gangwon Province on February 26, 1980. The cave is home to Namkungia biryongensis, an endangered species of ice-crawler insects. Fauna of this cave discovered so-far include 12 orders and 21 species.
