= Auguste Jean François Grenier =

French medical doctor and entomologist

Auguste Jean François Grenier (22 September 1814, in Andelys – 13 July 1890, in Bagnères) was a French medical doctor and entomologist. He studied at Rouen, then at Paris where he qualified as a doctor in 1842. He was devoted to entomology only between 1857 and 1859. The war of 1870 put an end to his research.

Grenier was especially interested in cavernicolous Coleoptera and made a large collection including the cave insect collections of Charles Nicholas Aubé (1802–1869) and of Jules Linder (1830–1869). His collection is preserved by the Société entomologique de France. He was president of that society in 1865.
