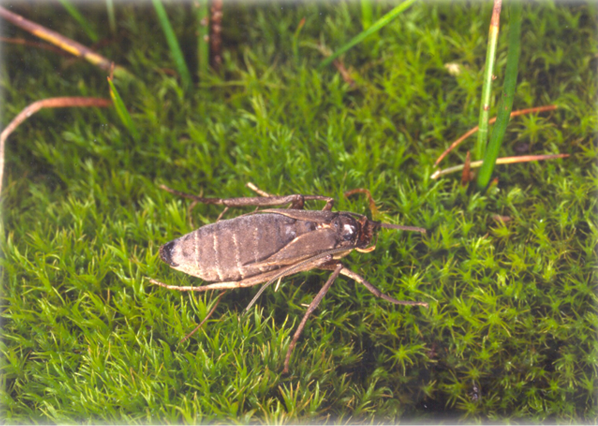

Scientific classification
- Kingdom: Animalia
- Phylum: Arthropoda
- Class: Insecta
- Order: Lepidoptera
- Family: Tineidae
- Genus: Pringleophaga
- Species: P. marioni

Binomial name
- Pringleophaga marioni Viette, 1968

= Pringleophaga marioni =

Species of moth

Pringleophaga marioni (Marion flightless moth or Subantarctic caterpillar) is a moth of the family Tineidae. It is endemic to Marion Island. Beside being unable to fly, this moth species is notable because of its ability to resist temperatures that are so low, that they would kill most other species.

== See also ==
- Pringlea
