= Kanas River =

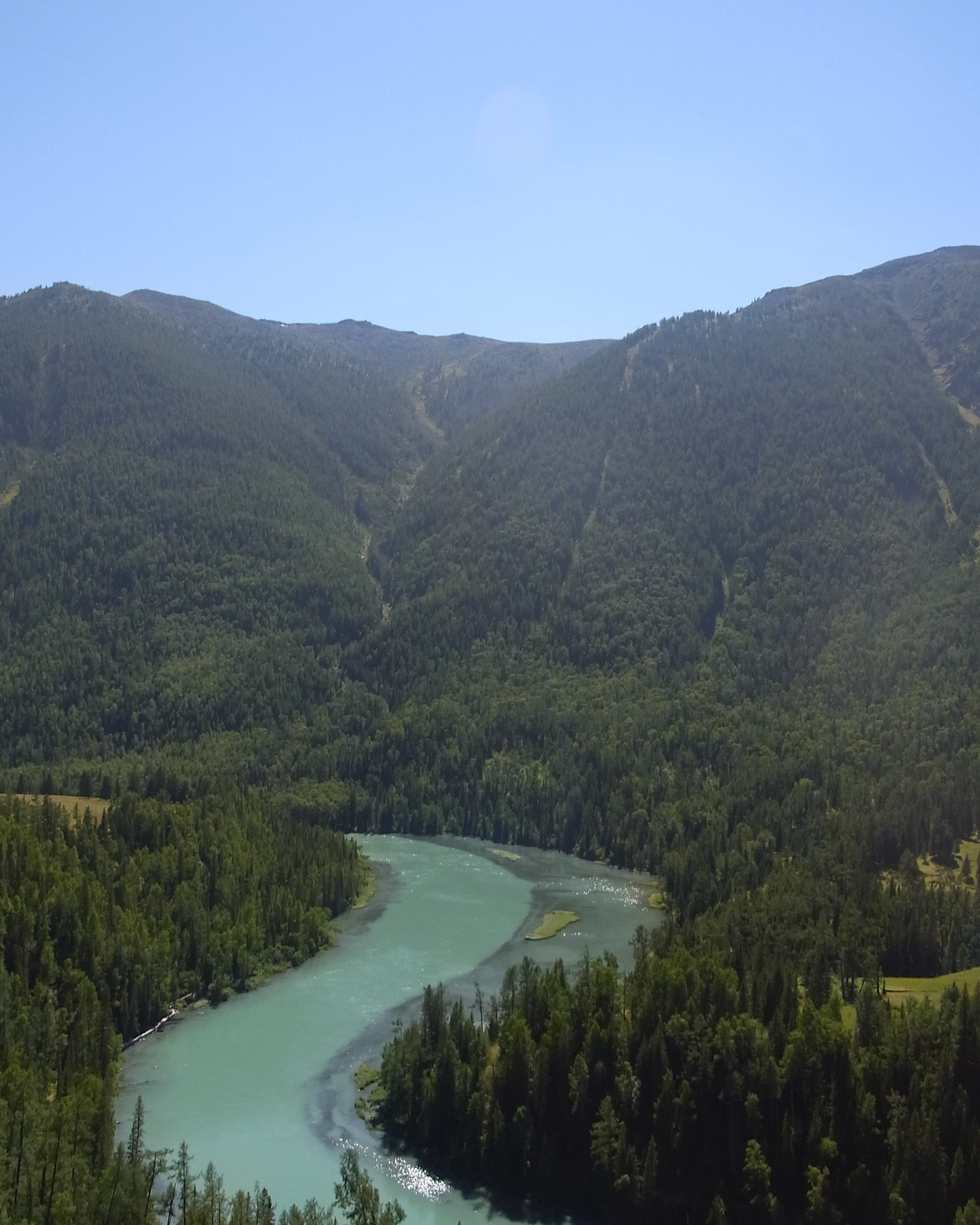
- Moon Bay, a scenic spot on the Kanas River

- Location within Dzungaria

Location
- Country: China
- Auton. region: Xinjiang

Physical characteristics
- Mouth: Burqin
  - coordinates: 48°30′18″N 87°19′31″E

Basin features
- Progression: Burqin→ Irtysh→ Ob→ Kara Sea

The Kanas River (Chinese: 喀納斯河) is a river in Burqin County, Altay Prefecture, Xinjiang, China. It originates from the main peaks of the Altai Mountains. It is a perennial river with a total length of 125 kilometers, an average width of about 50 meters, and a maximum width of 100 meters. Converging with the Hemu River to form the Burqin River, the water velocity at the Kanas Bridge is 2.5 meters per second under the perennial water level.
