= Andrew Nelson Caudell =

American entomologist (1872–1936)

- Born: 18 August 1872; Indianapolis, Indiana, U.S.
- Died: 1 March 1936 (aged 63); Washington, D.C., U.S.
- Education: Oklahoma Agricultural and Mechanical College, Massachusetts Agricultural College
- Years active: 1890s–1930s
- Employer: United States Department of Agriculture
- Known for: Entomologist

Andrew Nelson Caudell (18 August 1872 – 1 March 1936) was an entomologist who specialized in the study of grasshoppers and other insects in the order Orthoptera, becoming a prolific author of taxonomic studies, a member and president (in 1915) of the Entomological Society of Washington, and a fellow of the American Association for the Advancement of Science.

== Biography ==
Caudell was born August 18, 1872, in Indianapolis, Indiana, a son of Andrew Jackson and Mary Jane (née Bannon) Caudell. Raised in Oklahoma, he collected insects around the family farm. His introduction to entomology happened when he sheltered in an old building during a rain. There he found a copy of the US Department of Agriculture with notes on insects. He became an assistant at the entomology collections at the local college even before graduating at the agricultural college and then joined to complete his Bachelor of Science degree at Oklahoma Territorial Agricultural and Mechanical College in Stillwater, Oklahoma, now Oklahoma State University, and undertook postgraduate study at Massachusetts Agricultural College, now the University of Massachusetts Amherst.

After a brief employment with the Gypsy Moth Project in Massachusetts, he joined the Division of Insects of the United States Department of Agriculture in 1898 and remained with the department until his death. In addition to his USDA duties, he served as custodian of the Orthoptera collection of the Division of Insects of the United States National Museum, now the National Museum of Natural History in Washington, D.C. Along with Harrison Dyar, he was sent on collection expeditions to British Columbia (1903) and Colorado (1901). Caudell maintained meticulous card indexes on Orthoptera and also took an interest in the Zoraptera and was well known for writing the Entomological Code in 1912 with Nathan Banks that was considered a supplement to the International Code of Zoological Nomenclature.

He married on April 12, 1900, Penelope Lee Cundiff in a unique ceremony performed over telegraph lines with the bride in Mulhall, Oklahoma, and the groom in Kansas City, Kansas, with the minister and two witnesses, possibly the first such ceremony ever performed. They had one daughter.

Caudell died on March 1, 1936, at Washington, D.C. Among other honors, he is memorialized by two pyralid moth taxa published in a single paper by fellow entomologist and co-worker Harrison Gray Dyar Jr., the species Megasis caudellella (Dyar, 1904) and the genus Caudellia (Dyar, 1904) and the tettigoniid grasshopper Conocephalus caudellianus (Davis, 1905), Caudell's conehead.
