= Wingless insect =

Insect lacking wings

There are various disparate groups of wingless insects. Apterygota are a subclass of small, agile insects, distinguished from other insects by their lack of wings in the present and in their evolutionary history. They include Thysanura (silverfish and firebrats). Some species lacking wings are members of insect orders that generally do have wings. Some do not grow wings at all, having "lost" the possibility in the remote past. Some have reduced wings that are not useful for flying. Some develop wings but shed them after they are no longer useful. Other groups of insects may have castes with wings and castes without, such as ants. Ants have alate queens and males during the mating season and wingless workers, which allows for smaller workers and more populous colonies than comparable winged wasp species.

== Wingless flies ==
True flies are insects of the order Diptera. The name is derived from the Greek di- = two, and ptera = wings. Most insects of this order have two wings (not counting the halteres, club-like limbs which are homologous to the second pair of wings found on insects of other orders). Wingless flies are found on some islands and other isolated places. Some are parasites, resembling ticks.

=== Wingless flies ===
- Chionea scita, a type of snow crane fly
- Genus Badisis
- Family Braulidae, or bee lice
- Melophagus ovinus, or the sheep ked
- Mystacinobia zelandica, the New Zealand batfly
- Wingless midges
  - Genus Belgica, including Belgica antarctica, the Antarctic midge
  - Genus Pontomyia, marine flightless midges

=== Fly species that shed wings ===
- Lipoptena mazamae, the Neotropical deer ked

=== Wingless mutant flies ===
- Flightless fruit fly

== Wingless moths ==
There are many species of wingless moths. Often only the females are wingless (larviform females).

=== Moth species having wingless females ===
- Luffia lapidella
- Operophtera fagata, the northern winter moth
- Orgyia recens, the scarce vapourer
- Pachythelia villosella
- Operophtera brumata, the winter moth

Many more

=== Flightless moths ===
- Pringleophaga marioni, the Subantarctic caterpillar

== Wingless wasps ==
- Family Rhopalosomatidae, having winged, wingless, and reduced-wing species

=== Wasp species having wingless females ===
- Family Mutillidae, with more than 3,000 species
- Diamma bicolor, the blue ant (a wasp)
- Some ichneumon wasps like Gelis

== Others ==
- Order Notoptera
- Order Phthiraptera, lice, a wingless order under the winged superorder Exopterygota
- Order Siphonaptera, fleas, believed to have had winged ancestors
- Family Eumastacidae, grasshoppers having many wingless species
- Family Lampyridae, fireflies which often have larviform females
- Family Myrmecophilidae, ant crickets
- Family Trichogrammatidae, parasitic wasps, some species of which have wingless males that mate and die inside the host egg
- Genus Platerodrilus, trilobite beetles with flightless larviform females
- Thinopinus pictus, the pictured rove beetle
