= Ake Kule Lake =

Lake in Xinjiang, China

- 阿克库勒湖 (Chinese); Aq kol (White lake) (Kazakh)
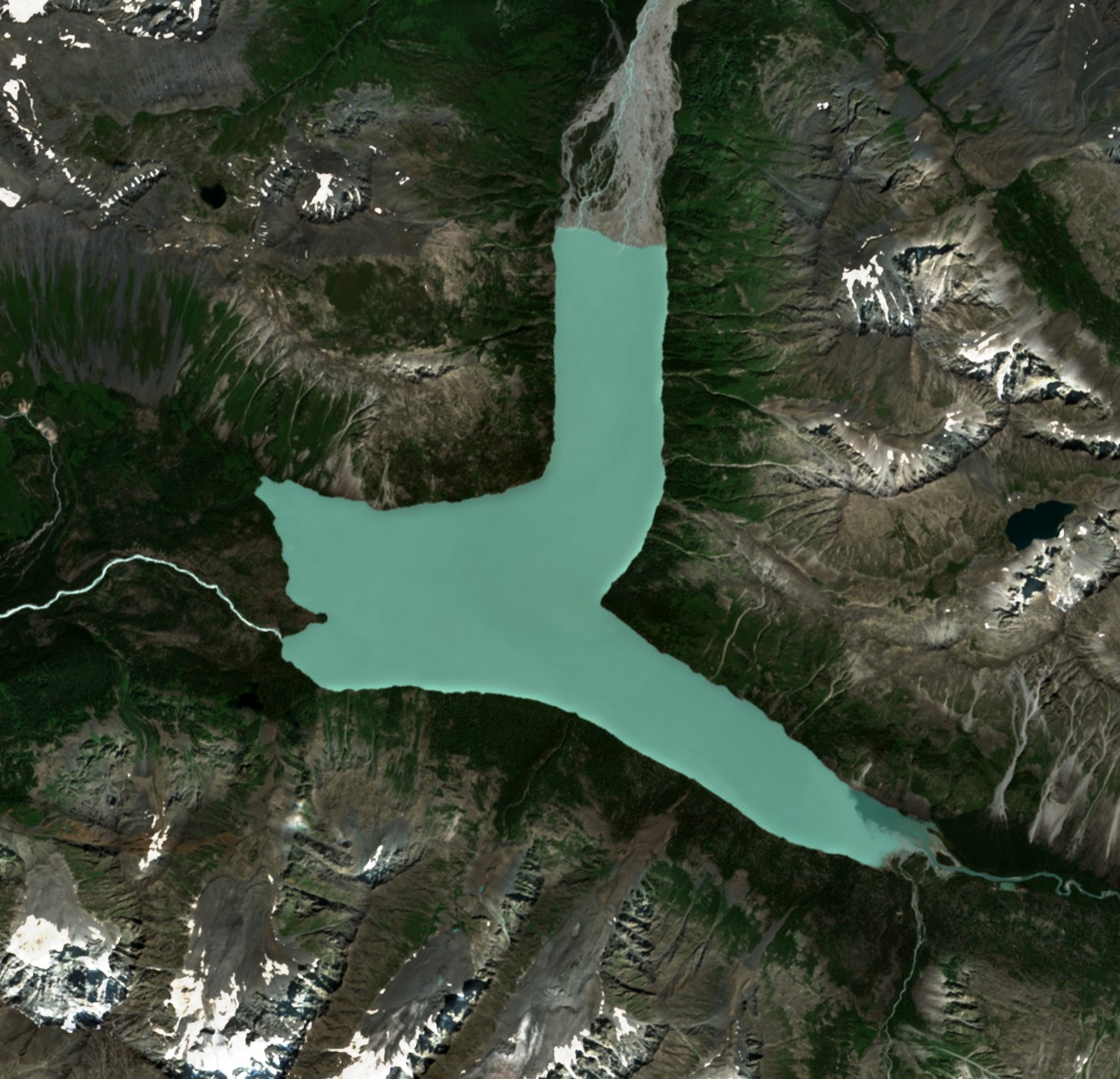
- Sentinel-2 image (2021)

- Location within Dzungaria
- Location: Altay Prefecture, Xinjiang, China
- Coordinates: 49.048°N 87.568°E
- Type: Lake
- Primary inflows: Kanas River
- Primary outflows: Kanas River
- Surface area: 4.43 square kilometers (1.71 sq mi)

Ake Kule Lake (Chinese: 阿克库勒湖; pinyin: Ākèkùlēi hú) is a lake in Altay Prefecture, Xinjiang, China, close to the borders of Kazakhstan, Mongolia and Russia. It measures approximately 4.43 square kilometers (1.71 sq mi) in area.

The lake is situated on the Kanas River in Altai highland. It has formed behind the moraine left by the glacier which formerly occupied this part of the Kanas River valley and has receded after the end of the quaternary glaciation period.

The lake's name roughly translates to White (Aq/Ak) Lake (köl / kul) due to the Glacial meltwater creating a fine rock flour that looks milky or whitish in appearance
