= Cave insect =

Group of troglofauna

Cave-dwelling insects are among the most widespread and prominent troglofauna (cave-dwelling animals), including troglobites, troglophiles, and trogloxenes. As a category of ecological adaptations, such insects are significant in many senses, ecological, evolutionary, and physiological.

== Introduction ==
A cave is an unusually well-defined ecological habitat in terms of its nature, time, and place. Accordingly, it is not surprising that a number of insects permanently inhabit caves, especially at the deepest levels, and are markedly specialised for niches in some of the extreme conditions. These are the true cavernicole species; troglobites rather than troglophiles or trogloxenes. These include; spiders and insects.

Cavernicolous insect species rarely are adapted to move from cave to cave, so each species or community generally will be restricted wholly to certain caves or cave systems each, and commonly will have evolved in their respective home cave systems. Exceptions commonly are those that have been carried by mobile vertebrate trogloxenes or troglophiles, though in some cases a number of populations may have evolved from a single mobile troglophile population. Caves tend to be geologically short-lived, so most of the specialised adaptations are correspondingly young in evolutionary terms and to have arisen rapidly and in parallel from similar ancestors that began as similar troglophiles in separated caves. Many insect troglobites are Orthopteran, Collembolan, or Blattodean, for example, and given the nature of their open-air ancestral species, it would be in no way surprising that where a cave becomes available, it soon is invaded by opportunistic troglophiles that may be widely distributed and may evolve similarly in separate caves in different areas.

Caves also appear to have become the last refugium for many ancient types of insects, which are no longer found free in the open in surrounding regions. Such cave fauna thus represent, at least in part, relicts. It does not follow that they had been in those particular caves since ancient times though. For example, modern troglobitic Onychophora had not been occupying their current caves since the Carboniferous period but had entered new caves comparatively recently and flourished by exaptation.

Once adapted to troglobitic existence, cave insects become specialised and dependent on the cavernicolous conditions; when suddenly exposed to the outside world, they are likely to succumb rapidly.

True cavernicolous species, troglobites, include many animals apart from insects. There are various troglobites among the planarians, Oligochaeta, Polychaeta, leeches, Mollusca, and fishes. Troglobitic Crustaceans include species of Amphipoda, Cladocera, Copepoda, Decapoda, Isopoda, and Syncarida. Many troglobites are predatory, including Chilopoda, Acari, Opiliones, Chernetidae, and spiders.

Troglobitic insects include Apterygota such as Campodea and various Collembola. There are many species of beetles in families such as Carabidae, Curculionidae, Leiodidae, and Silphidae. Some Orthoptera are troglobitic and some are trogloxenic. The order Blattodea includes troglobites, and so do the Trichoptera and Diptera.

== Categorization of cave dwellers ==
The cave dwellers fall under one of the following categories:

- Troglobite species are true cave dwellers, occurring exclusively in caves and unable to survive in the open.
  True troglobites among insects include many Coleoptera, some Stenopelmatidae, Diptera, and Zygentoma.
- Troglophile species sometimes occur outside the cave habitat but typically complete their life cycle in caves.
- Trogloxene cannot live permanently in caves, but may enter caves and spend parts of their life cycles in caves.
  Unusual South African Tettigoniidae in a few genera such as Cederbergeniana are trogloxenes that feed on plants by night and shelter in caves by day.

== The cave environment ==
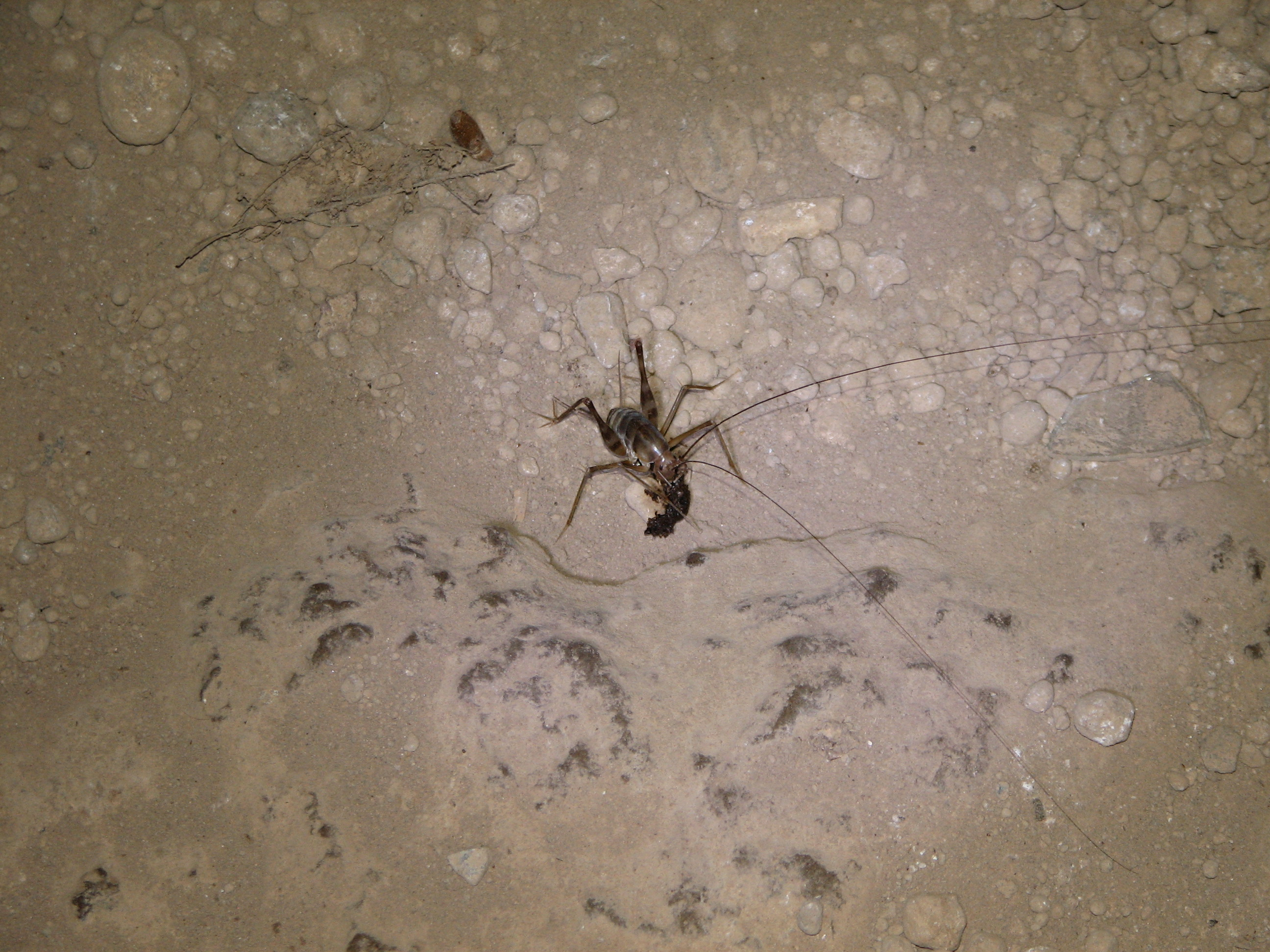
A cave cricket (Rhaphidophoridae) in a cave in Thailand eating guano

The climate in deep caves typically is without distinction of day and night, But insects have a sleeping pattern and not many are affected even by the passage of the seasons. Violent winds and storms are unknown, though there may be steady air currents under some circumstances. Humidity is roughly stable. Communications with the outside world only occur under special conditions such as floods and exceptional droughts. Where streams pass through caves or water seeps in, they commonly are important sources of nutrition.

Trogloxenes are important to cave ecology, because they commonly feed outside and import material that serves as food when they return. Insect species such as some butterflies, flies, and beetles over-winter in caves, and casualties remain as food. Cavernicolous bats, being trogloxenes, are major ecological factors in some caves where they spend their daylight hours, and some species such as Mexican free-tailed bats provide massive deposits of organic matter, mainly in the form of faeces and carcasses.

Other trogloxenic animals include vertebrates such as bears, hyenas, other predators, reptiles, oilbirds, cave swiftlets and even humans, that enter for short term shelter or for hibernation. Most of them contribute organic matter rather than consuming it, and are important resources for troglobitic insects, many of which actually specialise in reliance on particular species that are long-term regular visitors. The cave environment thus is characterised by absence, restriction, or attenuation of certain factors such as light, circadian or seasonal stimuli, living space, freedom of movement, or abrupt contrasts in temperature and humidity. Other items may depend on local conditions; for example, most caves provide little available food and some provide little water, whereas some provide perennial water or quantities of dung so great as to support ecological stratification, with organisms preying on other organisms that live in turn on different stages of the original product.

The ultimate sources of nearly all food in caves are outside the cave. Running water and air currents carry in carcasses and other organic detritus. Fungi and bacteria that develop on this material provide food for many cave dwellers. Bat guano represents another source. Lepidoptera that enter caves for sleeping are preyed upon by troglobitic Orthoptera, largely Tettigoniidae and Gryllidae. The cavernicolous Collembola feed on colloidal matter in the water or dust borne on the surface tension. The insects and similarly sized invertebrates are food for spiders and Myriapoda. Most such activities go on in darkness, except close to the outside, or where certain microbes or insects such as Arachnocampa provide bioluminescence, even if only to attract prey.

== Evolutionary characteristics ==
In individual caves, the most conspicuous and perhaps most ubiquitous peculiarity of insects, as with other troglobites, is the reduction of body pigmentation. This does not apply to all cavernicolous insects. It is particularly marked in Coleoptera. The reduction or total loss of body pigmentation is correlated with the absence of sunlight. A second peculiarity is the reduction of eyes in all cavernicolous species. This contrasts with most nocturnal or crepuscular species, in many of which there is a strong tendency to adapt to low light levels by responding to selection for large, highly sensitive eyes.

A form of adaptation common to many cave insects as well as some external predatory species, is elongation of appendages, especially the antennae, palps and forelegs that assist in precise location of prey before striking. Many also bear elongated sensory organs, typically setae, as for example, in the beetle Scotoplanetes arenstorffianus, in which there are well developed setae, including on the elytra and also supraorbitally, but the eyes themselves are absent. from Herzegovina. In contrast, none of the free-living related carabids have such sensory setae on the elytra. Troglobitic insects commonly have no functional wings, and many have no wings at all. One exception is Troglocladius hajdi (family Chironomidae), which has strongly reduced eyes consisting of only 0–4 ommatidia, yet have well-developed wings and is able to fly in total darkness. Among the cave beetles the elytra may be retained as sclerotised bodily protection, but the hind wings, that are used for flight in most beetles, are non-functional or absent.

== Geographical locations ==
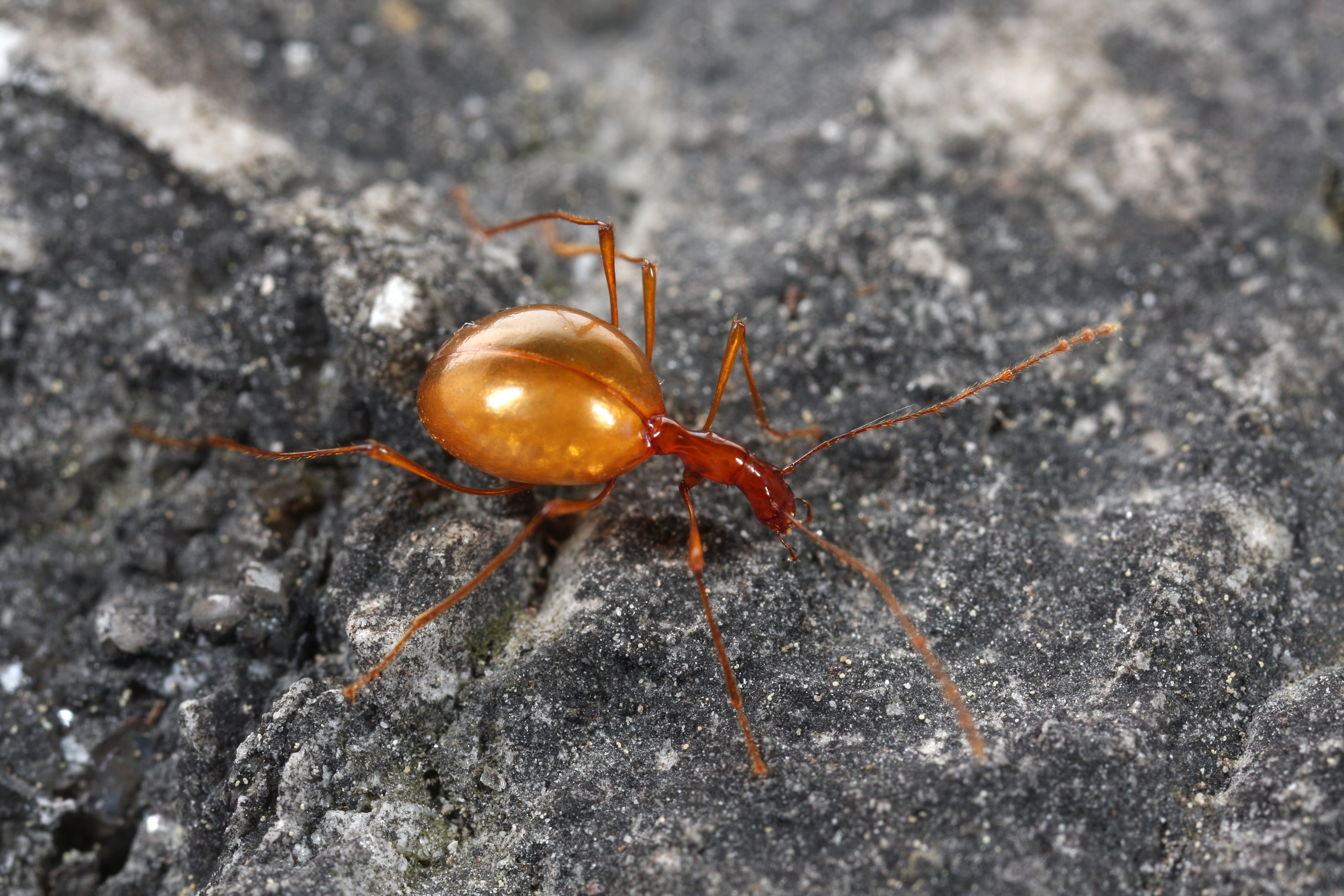
Leptodirus hochenwartii

Some important cave insects from Europe include the following: Paraoalyscia wollastoni, Bathysciola fauveli, Trechus (Trichaphaenops) sollandi, Royerella villaridi, Trechus (Trichaphaenops) angulipennis, Trechus (Duvalius) pilosellus stobieckii, etc. The beetle Leptodirus hochenwartii, found in the Postojna cave system in Slovenia, was the first animal to be recognized as a true cave dweller.

The cave insects found in the Atlas Mountains include blind Trechus jurijurae, Aphaenops iblis, Nebria nudicollis with very long antennae and legs, the staphylinids Paraleptusa cavatica and Apterophaenops longiceps, and the curculionid Troglorrhynchus mairei. The carabid Laemostenus fezzensis is a troglophile. Neaphaenops tellkampfi occurs in caves in Kentucky. The American stenopelmatid Hadenoecus subterraneus is recorded from Kentucky caves. The remarkable carabid Comstockia subterranea is a true cave species found in Texas. The exclusively cave-dwelling silphid Adelops hirtus occurs in Kentucky caves and has very minute, unpigmented, atrophied eyes.

The Hawaiian Islands have a significant number of endemic cave insects that inhabit lava tubes, including several blind planthoppers that feed on ʻōhiʻa roots (Oliarus polyphemus, Oliarus priola, Oliarus kalaupapae), a lava tube water treader (Cavaticovelia aaa), and several species of Caconemobius cave crickets.
