= Mesovelia amoena =

Scientific classification
- Domain: Eukaryota
- Kingdom: Animalia
- Phylum: Arthropoda
- Class: Insecta
- Order: Hemiptera
- Suborder: Heteroptera
- Family: Mesoveliidae
- Genus: Mesovelia
- Species: M. amoena

Binomial name
- Mesovelia amoena Uhler, 1894

Synonyms
- Mesovelia douglasensis Hungerford, 1924

Species of true bug

Mesovelia amoena is a species of water treader in the family Mesoveliidae. It is found in the Caribbean Sea, Central America, North America, Oceania, and South America.
