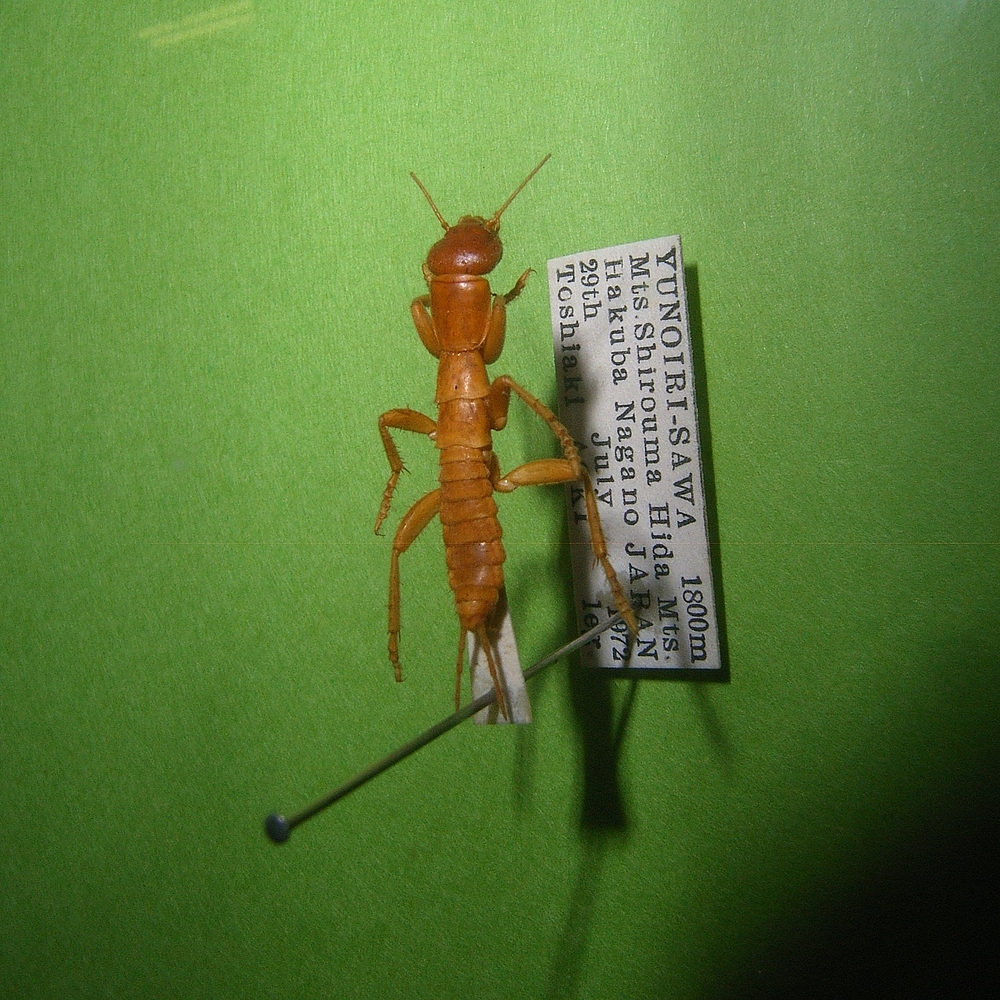
- Galloisiana nipponensis located in Hakuba, Nagano, Japan.
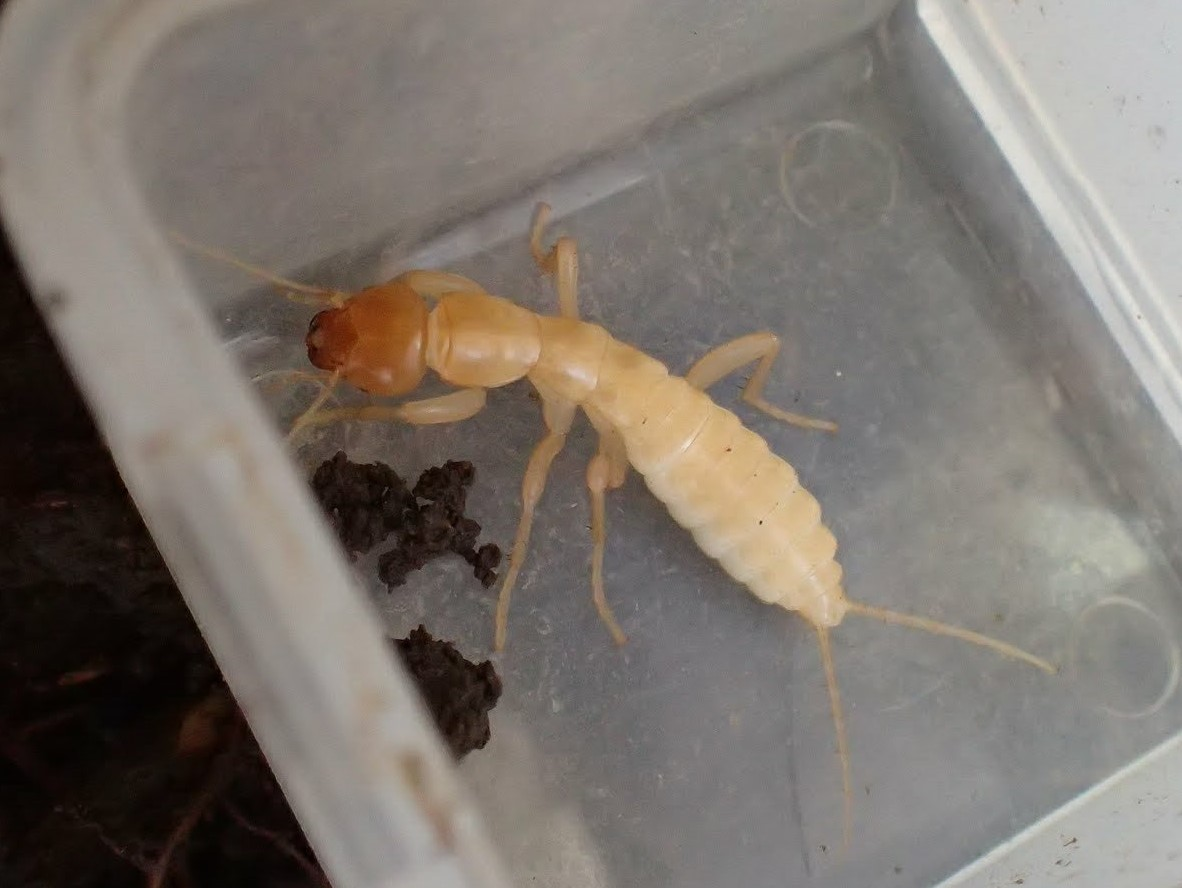
- Galloisiana kiyosawai located in Japan.

Scientific classification
- Kingdom: Animalia
- Phylum: Arthropoda
- Clade: Pancrustacea
- Class: Insecta
- Order: Grylloblattodea
- Family: Grylloblattidae
- Genus: Galloisiana; Caudell 1924

Species
- 12 species (see text)

Synonyms
- Galloisia Caudell & King 1924 (preoccupied)

= Galloisiana =

Genus of insects

Galloisiana is a genus of ice crawlers that belongs to the family Grylloblattidae. It is native to East Asia in countries such as Japan, Korea, China and Russia.

== Taxonomy ==
=== Species ===
This genus contains 14 described species. A list of species that belong to genus Galloisiana are listed below:

- Galloisiana chujoi Gurney 1961 – type locality: Oninoiwaya Cave, southern Japan
- Galloisiana harimensis Nakahama & Yamasaki, 2026 - western Honshu Island, Japan
- Galloisiana kawamurai Nakahama & Yamasaki, 2026 - western Honshu Island, Japan
- Galloisiana kiyosawai Asahina 1959 – type locality: Hirayu-Onsen, Honshu, Japan
- Galloisiana kosuensis Namkung 1974 – type locality: Gosu Cave, South Korea
- Galloisiana nipponensis (Caudell & King 1924) – type locality: Lake Chūzenji, Honshu Island, Japan
- Galloisiana notabilis Silvestri 1927 – type locality: Nagasaki Prefecture, southern Japan
- Galloisiana odaesanensis Kim & Lee 2007 – type locality: Mount Odae, South Korea
- Galloisiana olgae Vrsansky & Storozhenko 2001 – type locality: Mount Olga, Russia
- Galloisiana sinensis Wang 1987 – type locality: Paektu Mountain, PR China
- Galloisiana sofiae Szeptycki 1987 – type locality: Mount Myohyang, North Korea
- Galloisiana ussuriensis Storozhenko 1988 – type locality: Primorsky Krai, Russia
- Galloisiana yezoensis Asahina 1961 – type locality: Miyazaki-Toge, Japan
- Galloisiana yuasai Asahina 1959 – type locality: Tokugo-Toge, Honshu Island, Japan

== Habitat ==
Species of this genus prefer rocky areas and cool, moist environments. This means that they are frequently found near streams, often under rocks, in well developed forests.

There are currently seven species that are known to occur in Japan. They are G. chujoi, G. harimensis, G. kawamurai, G. kiyosawai, G. nipponensis, G. notabilis and G. yuasai. Specimens have also been collected in Shikoku, which are genetically close to specimens from the Suzuka Mountains. Unlike the Grylloblatta species of North America, they are not known to forage in snowfields. They are most abundant in montane habitats in central Honshu. In central Honshu, Galloisiana specimens have been collected in the following mountains and mountain ranges: Mount Agaki (volcano), Akaishi Mountains, Chikuma Mountains, Echigo Mountains, Mount Funagata, Mount Haruna (volcano), Hida Mountains, the Southern Hida Kogen Highlands, the Joshin'etsu Kogen Highlands, Kanto Mountains, Kiso Mountains, Mahiru Mountains, Mount Myoko, the Northern Ryohaku Mountains, Suzuka Mountains, Taishaku Mountains, Yatsugatake (volcanic cluster) and Mount Zao (volcanic cluster).

== Diet ==
Galloisiana species are generalist scavengers that feed on both plant and animal materials.
