= Galloisiana kosuensis =

Conservation status
- Critically Endangered (IUCN 3.1)

Scientific classification
- Kingdom: Animalia
- Phylum: Arthropoda
- Class: Insecta
- Order: Grylloblattodea
- Family: Grylloblattidae
- Genus: Galloisiana
- Species: G. kosuensis

Binomial name
- Galloisiana kosuensis Namkung, 1974

Species of insect

Galloisiana kosuensis is a species of cave-dwelling insect in the family Grylloblattidae. Its type locality is Gosu Cave, South Korea.

It was first described in 1974 by Joon Namkung, and is a species endemic to Korea, where it is found in Gosu Cave, Chungcheongbuk-do.
