= Kazumura Cave =

Cave on the island of Hawaiʻi

- Interactive map of Kazumura Cave
- Location: Hawaii County, Hawaii
- Depth: 3,613 feet (1,101 m)
- Length: 40.7 miles (65.5 km)
- Geology: Aila'au Lava Flow (500 years old)
- Entrances: 101
- Difficulty: Easy to Difficult
- Hazards: Varied
- Access: Private

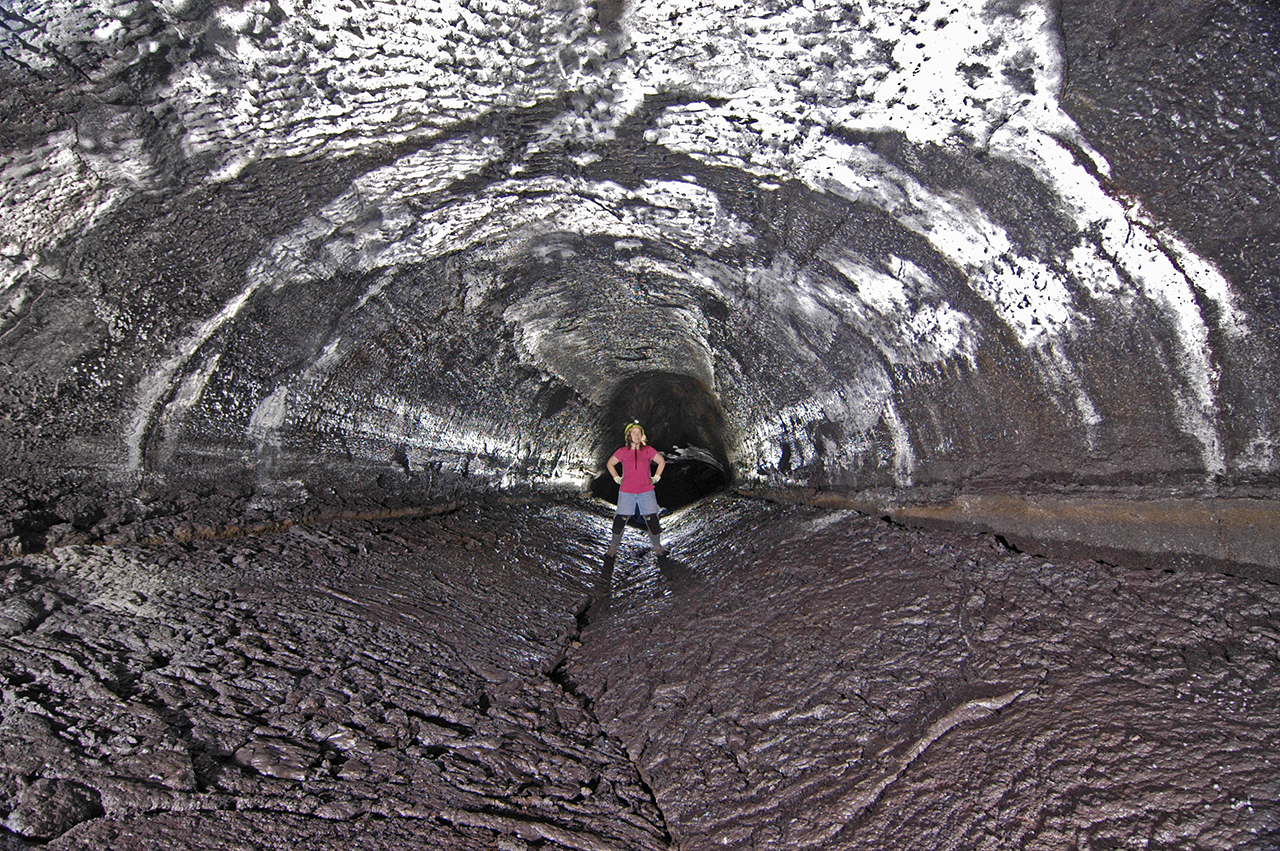
Arched passages in the main tube show the classic lava tube shape. The floor was the crust on a former lava lake that fell inward as it drained from beneath.

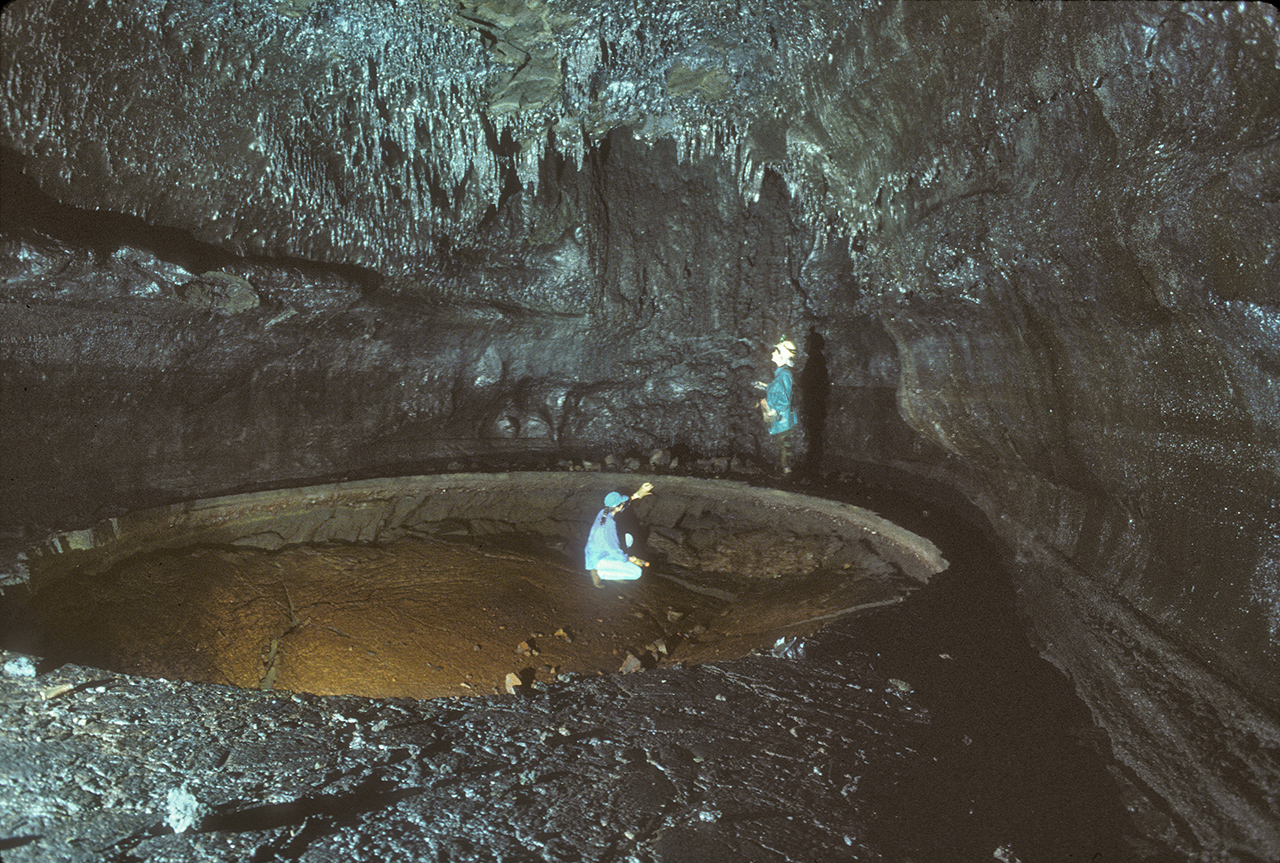
Collapse into a round lava lake after it drained. The source of the lava is the lavafall in the background.

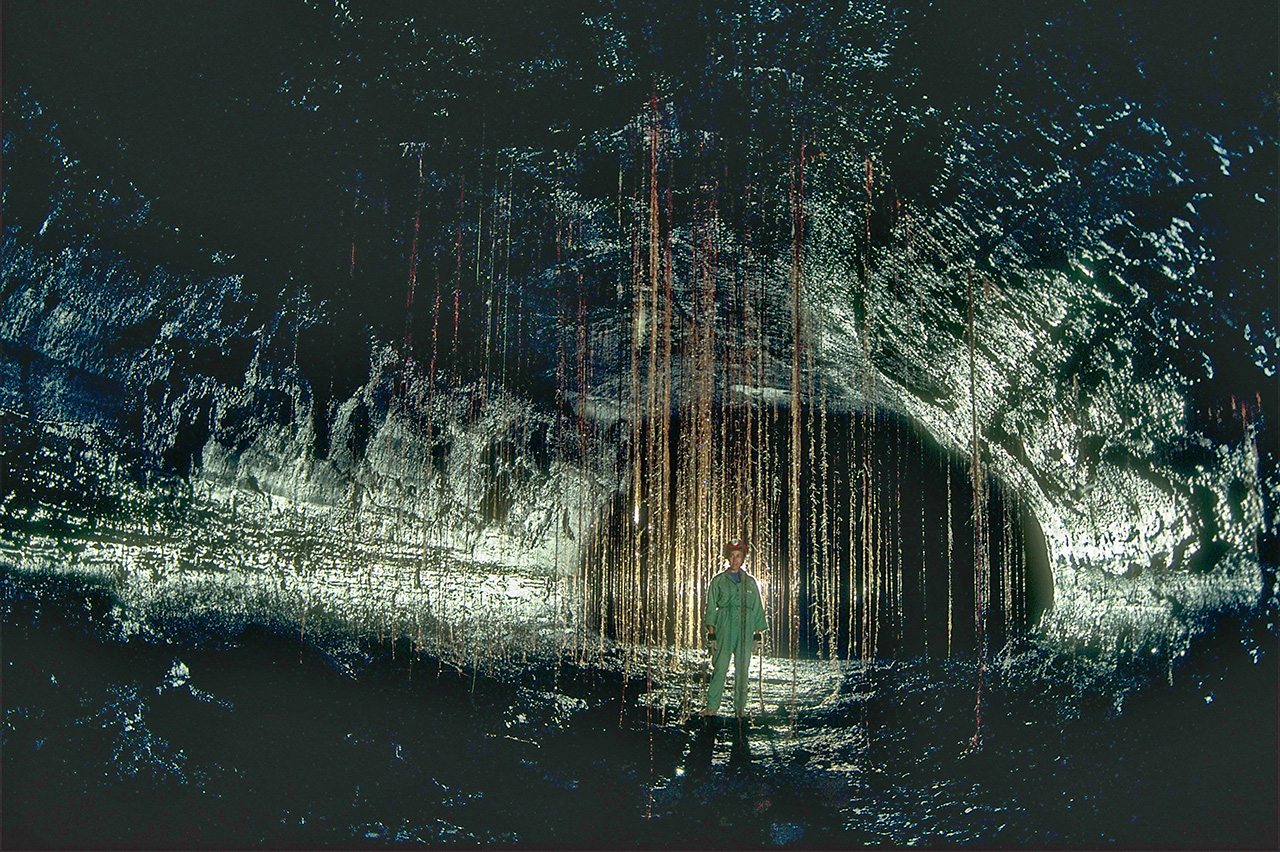
A forest of sensitive tree roots in the main corridor of Kazumura.

Kazumura Cave is a lava tube and has been surveyed at 40.7 miles (65.5 kilometers) long and 3,614 feet (1,102 meters) deep, making it the longest and deepest lava tube in the world. (Note: Kazumura Cave was not naturally this length. Short sections of solid black rock were dug through to connect the separate caves together. This makes Kazumura, at least in terms of measured length, an artificial construction since manmade passage is not, strictly speaking, a cave.) The cave is located on the island of Hawaiʻi on the eastern slope of Kīlauea. Kīlauea is the most recently active volcano on the Big Island. The ʻAilāʻau lava flow that contains Kazumura Cave originated from the Kīlauea Iki Crater about 500 years ago.

== History ==
One of the earliest documentations of Kazumura Cave was in 1966 when one of its entrances was designated as a fallout shelter. By the early 1970s, the cave had entered into the awareness of the caving community when Francis Howarth discovered new troglobitic moth species, Schrankia howarthi. Later in 1981, a British expedition ended up surveying 7.27 miles (11.70 km) of the cave, and it was then recognized as one of the world's longest lava tubes.

By 1993, a single year of extensive surveying established that it was the longest in the world. Originally, Kazumura was two separate caves known as Upper Kazumura and Old Kazumura. Kevin Allred and Mike Meyer connected the two caves after seeing a small connection and enlarging it to permit entry. More connections were made later at Paradise Park Cave when it was connected to Kazumura through a breakdown pile. Later, a culvert was installed to keep the passage stable. Sexton Cave was discovered nearby; its passage ended where Kazumura's began. After some digging in black lava rock, Kevin and Mike Shambaugh got close to connecting these two caves. Eventually, Shambaugh connected them after continuous digging. Kevin and Carlene Allred then surveyed the combined caves to a total of 29.32 miles (47.19 km), which made it the longest lava tube in the world.

Meanwhile, the next cave upslope was Olaʻa Cave, which was nearly connected to Sexton but was sealed off by more black lava rock. The cave would later be connected to Kazumura by Kevin and Shambaugh in 1995. Smaller caves near Old Kazumura were also connected, including Hawaiian Acres # 1, Fern's, and Doc Bellou Caves. The latter two are connected by a tight crawlway.

Kevin and Carlene Allred recorded their work in the Kazumura Cave Atlas, a complete map of all passages of Kazumura Cave. It lists a total of 40.77 miles (65.61 km) for the system as of 2002, with a linear extent of 20.05 miles (32.27 km).

The Kazumura Cave Atlas lists 101 entrances, all on private property. Under current Hawaiʻi laws, landowners must be asked before entering any lava tubes on their property. At least one landowner runs paid adventure tours through his section of the cave as of 2016.

== Ecology ==
Kazumura Cave hosts a number of endemic cave arthropods found only on the island of Hawai'i, including a blind planthopper which feeds on the roots of native ʻōhiʻa trees (Oliarus polyphemus), a cave cricket (Caconemobius varius), a millipede, two species of Schrankia moths, an earwig, several species of spiders, and a unique cave-adapted water treader (Cavaticovelia aaa). These arthropods likely use a network of interconnected cooling cracks in the surrounding pahoehoe lava as their primary habitat and sometimes disperse into the cave.

== See also ==
- List of longest caves in the United States
