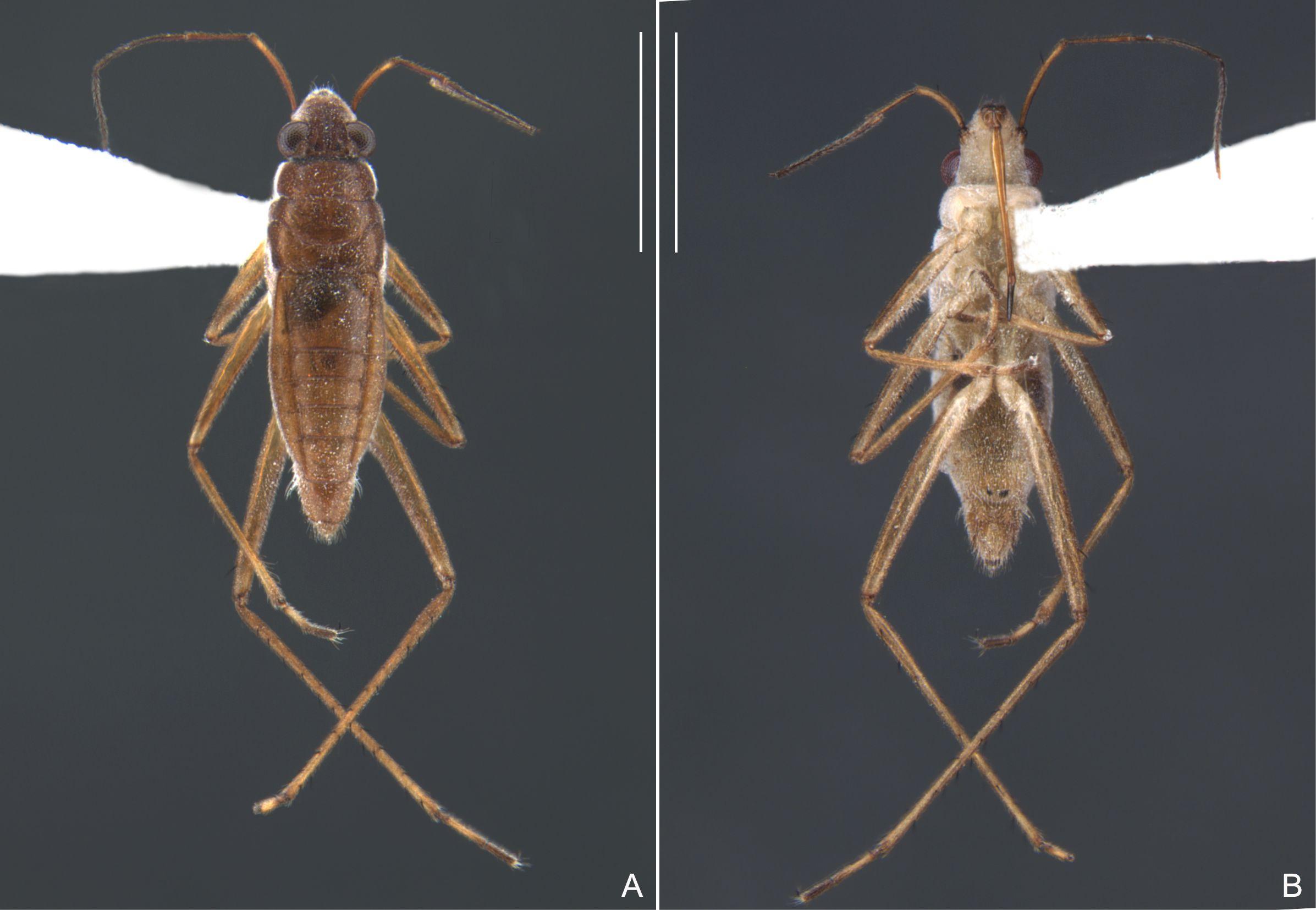

Scientific classification
- Kingdom: Animalia
- Phylum: Arthropoda
- Clade: Pancrustacea
- Class: Insecta
- Order: Hemiptera
- Suborder: Heteroptera
- Family: Mesoveliidae
- Genus: Mesovelia
- Species: M. mulsanti

Binomial name
- Mesovelia mulsanti White, 1879

Synonyms
- Mesovelia bisignata Uhler, 1884; Mesovelia mulsanti bisignata Uhler, 1884; Mesovelia mulsanti caraiba Jaczewski, 1930

= Mesovelia mulsanti =

Species of true bug

Mesovelia mulsanti, or Mulsant's water treader, is a species of water treader in the family Mesoveliidae 3–4 mm in size.

== Distribution and habitat ==
The main range is from southern Canada to Texas, but it is also found in Central America, South America, the Caribbean and Hawaii.

Mesovelia mulsanti inhabits a variety of freshwater environments, especially standing water with abundant floating vegetation such as duckweed and algae. It occurs in both shaded and unshaded areas.

== Behaviour ==
=== Life cycle ===
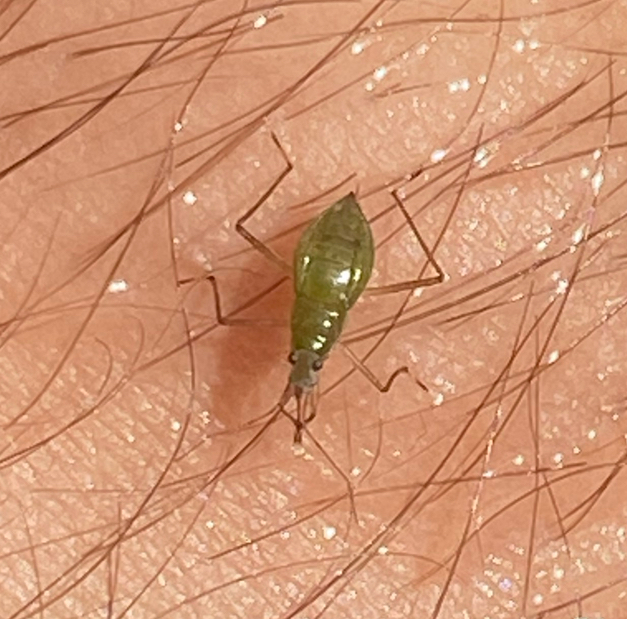
Adult female

A study conducted from 1983 to 1986 in Union County, Illinois, documented that M. mulsanti is typically trivoltine, producing three full generations per year, with a potential partial fourth generation in late autumn. The species overwinters exclusively as eggs; nymphs and adults do not survive freezing conditions.

In subtropical and tropical regions such as Florida and the Caribbean, M. mulsanti may reproduce year-round, often without entering diapause, due to the absence of cold periods.

=== Diet ===
Mesovelia mulsanti is a surface-dwelling predator, feeding on small invertebrates, primarily insects, found on or near the water surface. It may also prey on crustaceans that rise to the surface film.
