= Oliarus kalaupapae =

Conservation status
- Critically Imperiled (NatureServe)

Scientific classification
- Domain: Eukaryota
- Kingdom: Animalia
- Phylum: Arthropoda
- Class: Insecta
- Order: Hemiptera
- Suborder: Auchenorrhyncha
- Infraorder: Fulgoromorpha
- Family: Cixiidae
- Genus: Oliarus
- Species: O. kalaupapae

Binomial name
- Oliarus kalaupapae Hoch & Howarth 1998

Species of planthopper

Oliarus kalaupapae, the Moloka'i cave planthopper, is a species of Oliarus planthopper endemic to the island of Moloka'i, where it inhabits lava tubes.

== Description ==
Oliarus kalaupapae is among the least visibly cave-adapted of the Hawaiian cave planthoppers, and still retains wings and eyes (unlike Oliarus polyphemus and Oliarus priola on Hawai'i island and Maui, respectively). Adults are uniformly yellow colored and reach up to 5.6mm long, with females being slightly larger than males.

== Distribution and habitat ==
Olarius kalaupapae is only found on the island of Moloka'i, where it is restricted to dark caves and crevices. It inhabits lava tubes formed by the long-extinct East Moloka'i volcano hundreds of thousands of years ago.
