= Mesovelia polhemusi =

Scientific classification
- Domain: Eukaryota
- Kingdom: Animalia
- Phylum: Arthropoda
- Class: Insecta
- Order: Hemiptera
- Suborder: Heteroptera
- Family: Mesoveliidae
- Genus: Mesovelia
- Species: M. polhemusi

Binomial name
- Mesovelia polhemusi Spangler, 1990

Species of true bug

Mesovelia polhemusi is a species of water treader in the family Mesoveliidae. It was originally described from Belize and has since been found in southern Florida.

Mesovelia polhemusi is a marine insect, occupying tidal mangrove forests where few other aquatic insects are found. The species was named for John T. Polhemus.
