= Mesovelia vittigera =

Scientific classification
- Kingdom: Animalia
- Phylum: Arthropoda
- Clade: Pancrustacea
- Class: Insecta
- Order: Hemiptera
- Suborder: Heteroptera
- Family: Mesoveliidae
- Genus: Mesovelia
- Species: M. vittigera

Binomial name
- Mesovelia vittigera Horváth, 1895

Species of water treader

Mesovelia vittigera is a species of water treader in the genus Mesovelia, first described by Géza Horváth in 1895.
