= Galloisiana notabilis =

Scientific classification
- Kingdom: Animalia
- Phylum: Arthropoda
- Class: Insecta
- Order: Grylloblattodea
- Family: Grylloblattidae
- Genus: Galloisiana
- Species: G. notabilis

Binomial name
- Galloisiana notabilis (Silvestri 1927)

Species of insect

Galloisiana notabilis is a species of insect in the family Grylloblattidae that is endemic to southern Japan. Its type locality is Nagasaki Prefecture, Japan.

== Habitat ==
Galloisiana notabilis is a fossorial species that prefers rocky stream banks. It is one of the few grylloblattids found in low-elevation environments with hot summers. Galloisiana chujoi is the only other known grylloblattid species that is also found in Kyushu.
