= Galloisiana yuasai =

Scientific classification
- Kingdom: Animalia
- Phylum: Arthropoda
- Class: Insecta
- Order: Grylloblattodea
- Family: Grylloblattidae
- Genus: Galloisiana
- Species: G. yuasai

Binomial name
- Galloisiana yuasai Asahina 1959

Species of insect

Galloisiana yuasai is a species of insect in the family Grylloblattidae that is endemic to Japan. Its type locality is Tokugo Pass, Japan.

Galloisiana yuasai is found in montane habitats in central Honshu, including in the southern Hida Mountains where it is sympatric with the morphologically larger Galloisiana kiyosawai. It can be found alongside rocky stream banks.
