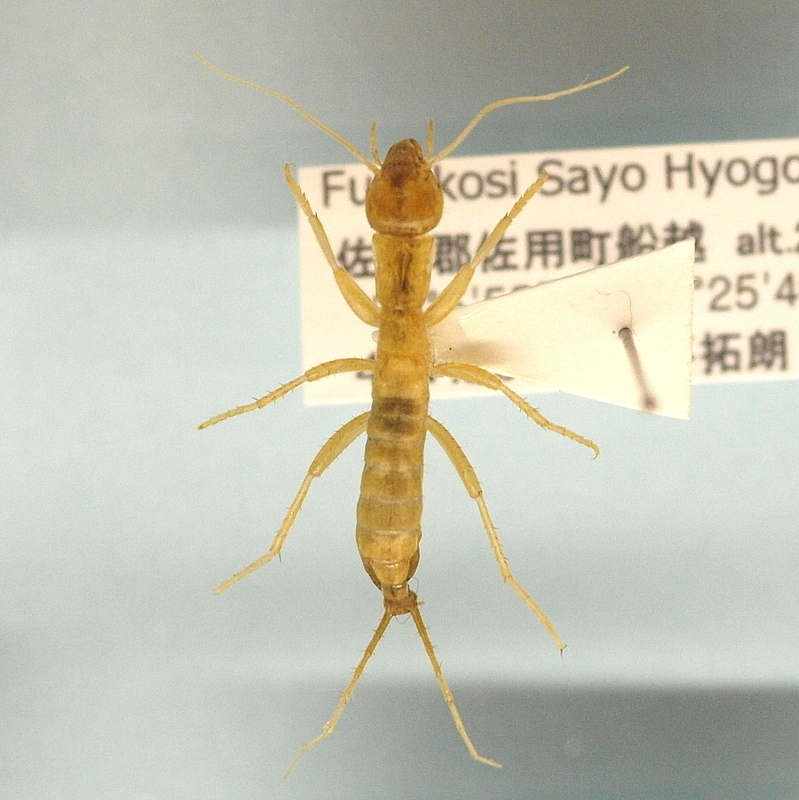
- Galloisiana nipponensis

Scientific classification
- Kingdom: Animalia
- Phylum: Arthropoda
- Class: Insecta
- Order: Grylloblattodea
- Family: Grylloblattidae
- Genus: Galloisiana
- Species: G. nipponensis

Binomial name
- Galloisiana nipponensis (Caudell & King 1924)

= Galloisiana nipponensis =

Species of insect

Galloisiana nipponensis is a species of insect in the family Grylloblattidae that is endemic to Japan. Its type locality is Lake Chūzenji, Japan.

== Range and habitat ==
It is found in montane habitats in central Honshu, including in the Taishaku Mountains (帝釈山脈) (near the Echigo Mountains).

== Life cycle ==
Individuals live for at least five years.
