= Galloisiana sofiae =

Scientific classification
- Kingdom: Animalia
- Phylum: Arthropoda
- Class: Insecta
- Order: Grylloblattodea
- Family: Grylloblattidae
- Genus: Galloisiana
- Species: G. sofiae

Binomial name
- Galloisiana sofiae Szeptycki 1987

Species of insect

Galloisiana sofiae is a species of insect in the family Grylloblattidae. Its type locality is Mount Myohyang, North Korea.
