= Galloisiana chujoi =

Scientific classification
- Kingdom: Animalia
- Phylum: Arthropoda
- Class: Insecta
- Order: Grylloblattodea
- Family: Grylloblattidae
- Genus: Galloisiana
- Species: G. chujoi

Binomial name
- Galloisiana chujoi Gurney 1961

Species of insect

Galloisiana chujoi is a species of cave-dwelling insect in the family Grylloblattidae that is endemic to southern Japan. Its type locality is Oninoiwaya Cave, Japan.
