= Galloisiana yezoensis =

Scientific classification
- Kingdom: Animalia
- Phylum: Arthropoda
- Clade: Pancrustacea
- Class: Insecta
- Order: Notoptera
- Suborder: Grylloblattodea
- Family: Grylloblattidae
- Genus: Galloisiana
- Species: G. yezoensis

Binomial name
- Galloisiana yezoensis Asahina 1961

Species of insect

Galloisiana yezoensis is a species of insect in the family Grylloblattidae that is endemic to Japan. Its type locality is Miyazaki Pass, Japan.

== Range and habitat ==
It is found in montane habitats in central Hokkaido.
