= Galloisiana sinensis =

Scientific classification
- Kingdom: Animalia
- Phylum: Arthropoda
- Class: Insecta
- Order: Grylloblattodea
- Family: Grylloblattidae
- Genus: Galloisiana
- Species: G. sinensis

Binomial name
- Galloisiana sinensis Wang 1987

Species of insect

Galloisiana sinensis is a species of insect in the family Grylloblattidae. Its type locality is Changbaishan in Jilin, northeastern China.
