= Galloisiana ussuriensis =

Scientific classification
- Kingdom: Animalia
- Phylum: Arthropoda
- Class: Insecta
- Order: Grylloblattodea
- Family: Grylloblattidae
- Genus: Galloisiana
- Species: G. ussuriensis

Binomial name
- Galloisiana ussuriensis Storozhenko 1988

Species of insect

Galloisiana ussuriensis is a species of insect in the family Grylloblattidae. Its type locality is Primorsky Krai, Russia.
