= Galloisiana odaesanensis =

Conservation status
- Near Threatened (IUCN 3.1)

Scientific classification
- Kingdom: Animalia
- Phylum: Arthropoda
- Class: Insecta
- Order: Grylloblattodea
- Family: Grylloblattidae
- Genus: Galloisiana
- Species: G. odaesanensis

Binomial name
- Galloisiana odaesanensis Kim & Lee 2007

Species of insect

Galloisiana odaesanensis is a species of insect in the family Grylloblattidae. Its type locality is Mount Odae in Gangwon Province, South Korea.

Specimens have also been collected at Sangwonsa.
