= Galloisiana olgae =

Scientific classification
- Kingdom: Animalia
- Phylum: Arthropoda
- Class: Insecta
- Order: Grylloblattodea
- Family: Grylloblattidae
- Genus: Galloisiana
- Species: G. olgae

Binomial name
- Galloisiana olgae Vrsansky & Storozhenko 2001

Species of insect

Galloisiana olgae is a species of insect in the family Grylloblattidae. Its type locality is Mount Olga, Russia.
