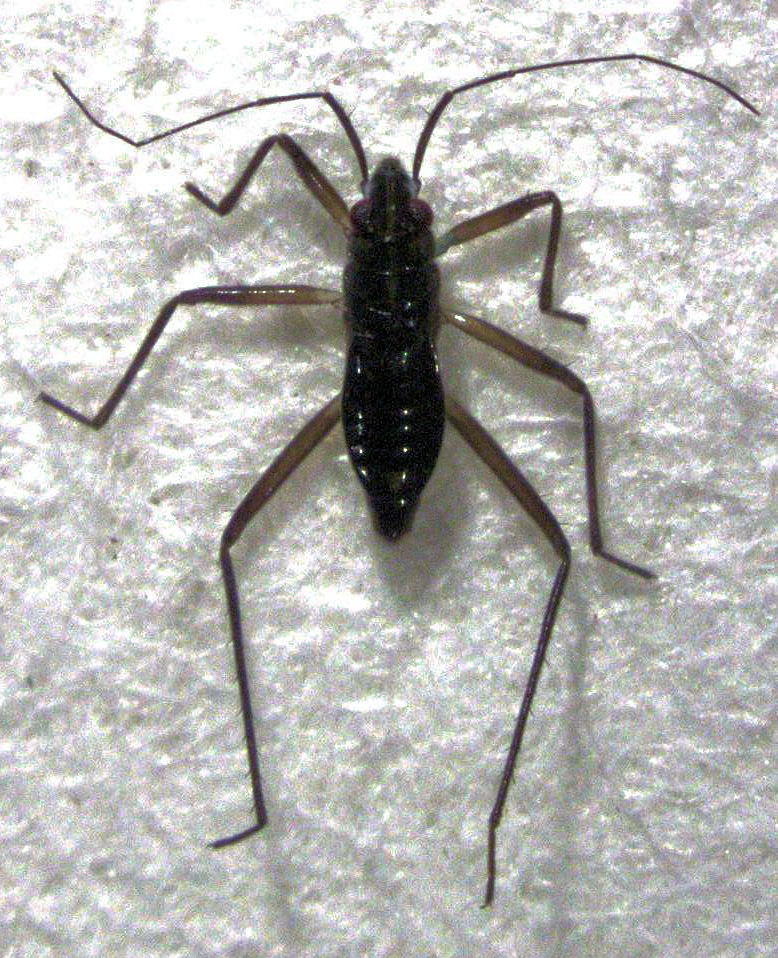
- Mesovelia hackeri

Scientific classification
- Domain: Eukaryota
- Kingdom: Animalia
- Phylum: Arthropoda
- Class: Insecta
- Order: Hemiptera
- Suborder: Heteroptera
- Family: Mesoveliidae
- Genus: Mesovelia; Mulsant & Rey, 1852

Synonyms
- Fieberia Jakovlev, 1873

= Mesovelia =

Genus of true bugs

Mesovelia is a genus of water treaders in the family Mesoveliidae. There are more than 30 described species in Mesovelia.

== Species ==
These 33 species belong to the genus Mesovelia:

- Mesovelia amoena Uhler, 1894
- Mesovelia bila Jaczewski, 1928
- Mesovelia blissi Drake, 1949
- Mesovelia cryptophila Hungerford, 1924
- Mesovelia dentiventris Linnavuori, 1971
- Mesovelia dominicana Garrouste & Nel, 2010
- Mesovelia easaci Jehamalar & Chandra, 2017
- Mesovelia ebbenielseni Andersen & Weir, 2004
- Mesovelia egorovi Kanyukova, 1981
- Mesovelia furcata Mulsant & Rey, 1852
- Mesovelia hackeri Harris & Drake, 1941
- Mesovelia halirrhyta J. Polhemus, 1975
- Mesovelia hambletoni Drake & Harris, 1946
- Mesovelia hilrrhyta Polhemus
- Mesovelia horvathi Lundblad, 1933
- Mesovelia hovarthi Lundblad, 1933
- Mesovelia hungerfordi Hale, 1926
- Mesovelia indica Horváth, 1915
- Mesovelia kumaria Jehamalar & Chandra, 2017
- Mesovelia lillyae Jehamalar & Chandra, 2017
- Mesovelia melanesica J. Polhemus & D. Polhemus, 2000
- Mesovelia miyamotoi Kerzhner, 1977
- Mesovelia mulsanti White, 1879 (Mulsant's water treader)
- Mesovelia pacifica Usinger, 1946
- Mesovelia polhemusi Spangler, 1990
- Mesovelia stysi J. Polhemus & D. Polhemus, 2000
- Mesovelia subvittata Horváth, 1915
- Mesovelia thermalis Horváth, 1915
- Mesovelia thomasi Hungerford, 1951
- Mesovelia tuberculata Floriano & Moreira in Floriano et al., 2016
- Mesovelia ujhelyii Lundblad, 1933
- Mesovelia vittigera Horváth, 1895
- Mesovelia zeteki Harris & Drake, 1941
