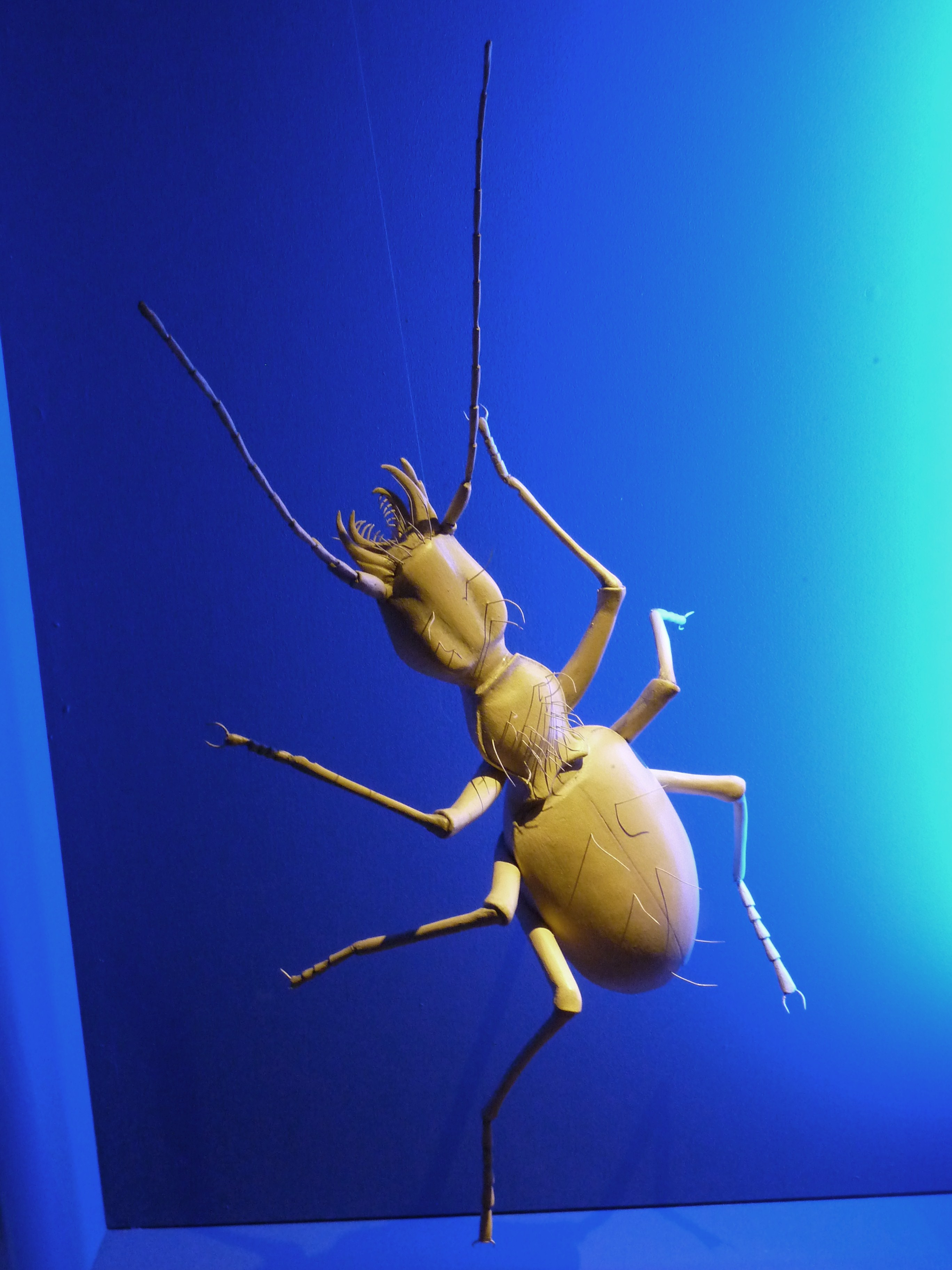
- Trichaphaenops sollaudi

Scientific classification
- Kingdom: Animalia
- Phylum: Arthropoda
- Class: Insecta
- Order: Coleoptera
- Suborder: Adephaga
- Family: Carabidae
- Subfamily: Trechinae
- Genus: Trichaphaenops; Jeannel, 1916

= Trichaphaenops =

Genus of beetles

Trichaphaenops is a genus of beetles in the family Carabidae, containing the following species:

- Trichaphaenops cerdonicus Abaille de Perrin, 1903
- Trichaphaenops crassicollis Jeannel, 1949
- Trichaphaenops gounellei Bedel, 1880
- Trichaphaenops raffaldianus Lemaire, 1981
- Trichaphaenops sollaudi Jeannel, 1916
