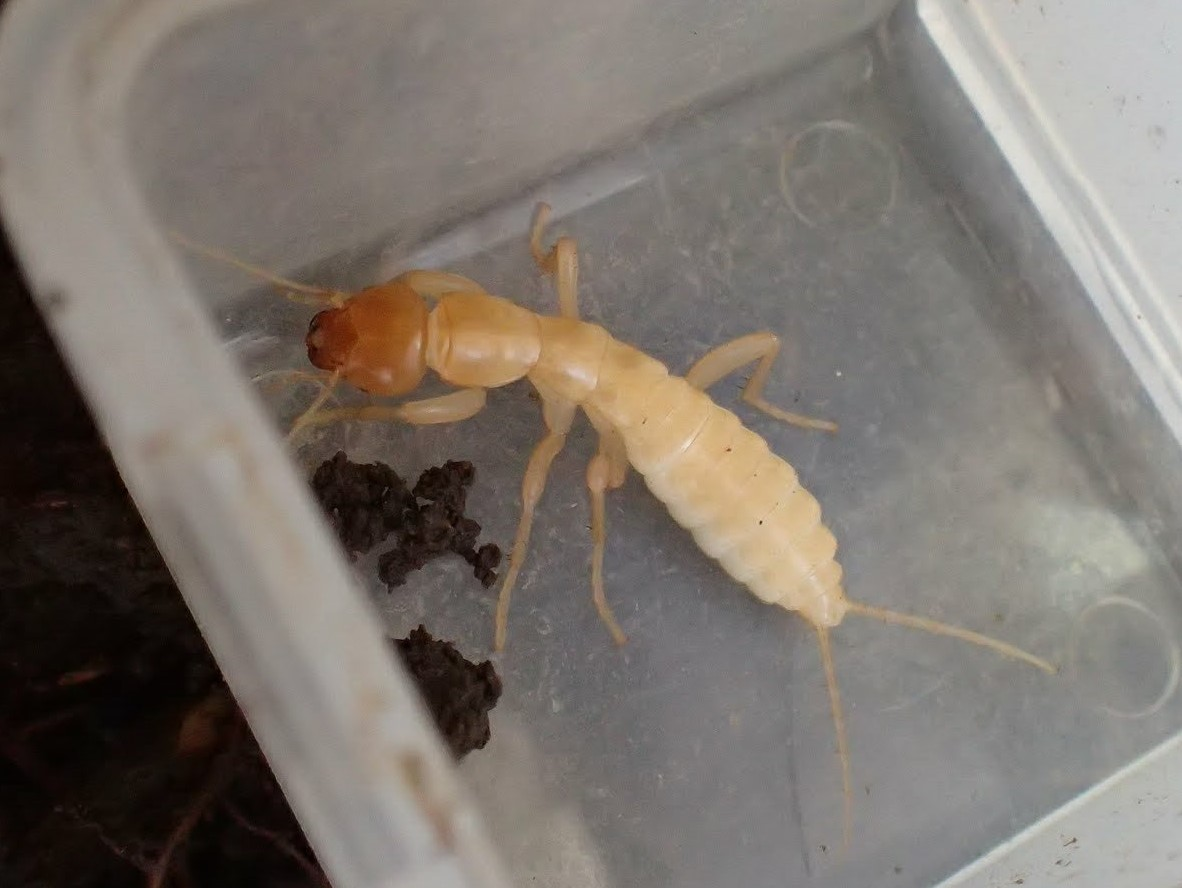

Scientific classification
- Kingdom: Animalia
- Phylum: Arthropoda
- Class: Insecta
- Order: Grylloblattodea
- Family: Grylloblattidae
- Genus: Galloisiana
- Species: G. kiyosawai

Binomial name
- Galloisiana kiyosawai Asahina, 1959

= Galloisiana kiyosawai =

Species of insect

Galloisiana kiyosawai is a species of insect in the family Grylloblattidae that is endemic to Japan. Its type locality is Hirayu Warm Springs, Japan.

== Range and habitat ==
It is found in montane habitats in central Honshu.
