= Nebria nudicollis =

Scientific classification
- Domain: Eukaryota
- Kingdom: Animalia
- Phylum: Arthropoda
- Class: Insecta
- Order: Coleoptera
- Suborder: Adephaga
- Family: Carabidae
- Genus: Nebria
- Species: N. nudicollis

Binomial name
- Nebria nudicollis Peyerimhoff, 1911

Species of beetle

Nebria nudicollis is a species of ground beetle in the Nebriinae subfamily that is endemic to Algeria. The species have 2 subspecies both of which are endemic to the same country. Their scientific names are Nebria nudicollis initialis and Nebria nudicollis nudicollis.
