= Oliarus priola =

Conservation status
- Critically Imperiled (NatureServe)

Scientific classification
- Domain: Eukaryota
- Kingdom: Animalia
- Phylum: Arthropoda
- Class: Insecta
- Order: Hemiptera
- Suborder: Auchenorrhyncha
- Infraorder: Fulgoromorpha
- Family: Cixiidae
- Genus: Oliarus
- Species: O. priola

Binomial name
- Oliarus priola Fennah 1973

Species of planthopper

Oliarus priola, the Maui cave planthopper, is a species of Oliarus planthopper endemic to the island of Maui, where it inhabits lava tubes.

== Description ==
Oliarus priola is completely pale and unpigmented, with no eyes. Its physical appearance is nearly identical to Oliarus polyphemus, a related cave planthopper on the island of Hawai'i.

== Distribution and habitat ==
Olarius priola is only found on the island of Maui. It inhabits lava tubes from the volcano Haleakalā. The type locality is Holoinawawai Stream Cave in Hana district.
