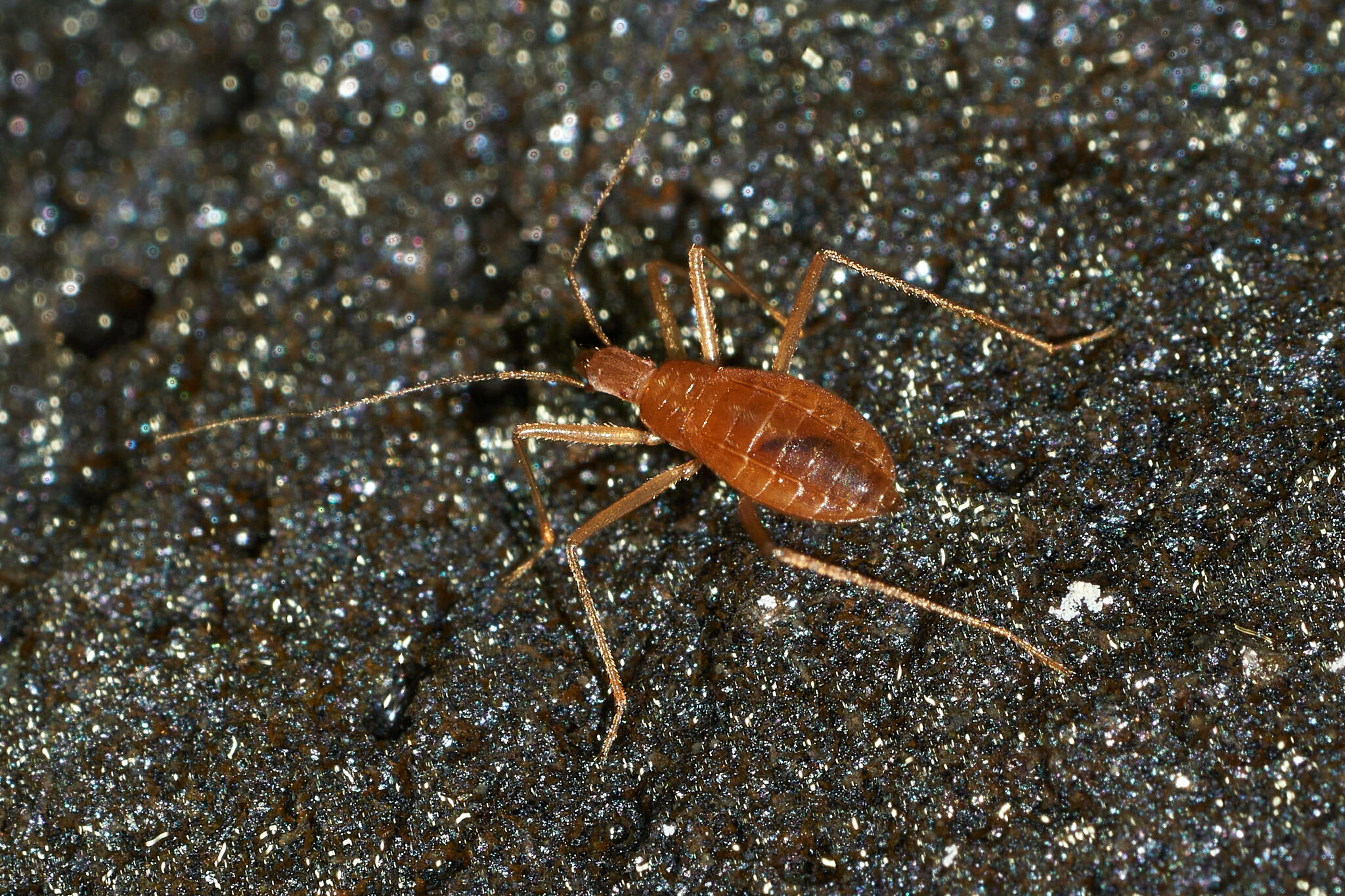

Scientific classification
- Domain: Eukaryota
- Kingdom: Animalia
- Phylum: Arthropoda
- Class: Insecta
- Order: Hemiptera
- Suborder: Heteroptera
- Family: Mesoveliidae
- Genus: Cavaticovelia; Andersen & J.Polhemus, 1980
- Species: C. aaa

Binomial name
- Cavaticovelia aaa (Gagné & Howarth, 1975)

Synonyms
- Speovelia aaa Gagne & Howarth 1975

= Cavaticovelia =

Genus of true bugs

Cavaticovelia is a monotypic genus of insects in the order Hemiptera, the true bugs, containing the single species Cavaticovelia aaa. This bug, known commonly as the aaa water treader, lava tube crawler, or lava tube water treader, is a water treader native to Hawaii.

The insect's specific name, aaa, is derived from ʻaʻaʻā, the Hawaiian word for "lava tube".

== Distribution & habitat ==
Cavaticovelia aaa is known from the Kazumura Cave system of lava tubes, where it can be found on the walls of the cave especially near seeps and crevices. This species is usually found associated with cave slimes growing on lava tube walls. It is only found on the island of Hawaii.

As with other Hawaiian lava tube endemic arthropods, the bulk of this species' habitat is expected to be a wide inaccessible network of lava cooling cracks filled with detritus and tree root systems that permeates the lava rock in the Puna and Kau districts. These crevice systems are expected to have a more stable microenvironment than the lava tubes themselves, with arthropod residents making excursions (transient or not) into the larger tubes. Since these crevice networks are not accessible to humans, C. aaa is only ever seen in the lava tubes themselves.

Like other lava tube endemic arthropods in Hawaii, C. aaa requires nearly saturated humidity to survive and will desiccate and die if the local humidity drops below 95%.

== Behavior & diet ==
Although Cavaticovelia aaa has eyes, it is functionally blind. It is not expected to feed on living prey, with dead or immobilized insects (including dead individuals of its own species) making up the bulk of its diet.
