= Darwinivelia =

Scientific classification
- Domain: Eukaryota
- Kingdom: Animalia
- Phylum: Arthropoda
- Class: Insecta
- Order: Hemiptera
- Suborder: Heteroptera
- Family: Mesoveliidae
- Genus: Darwinivelia; Andersen & J.Polhemus, 1980

Genus of insects

Darwinivelia is a genus of true bugs belonging to the family Mesoveliidae.

Species:

- Darwinivelia angulata J.Polhemus & Manzano, 1992
- Darwinivelia fosteri Andersen & J.Polhemus, 1980
- Darwinivelia polhemi Carvalho, 1984
