= Gosu Cave =

Limestone cave in Danyang, South Korea

Coordinates: 36.98856°N 128.381778°E

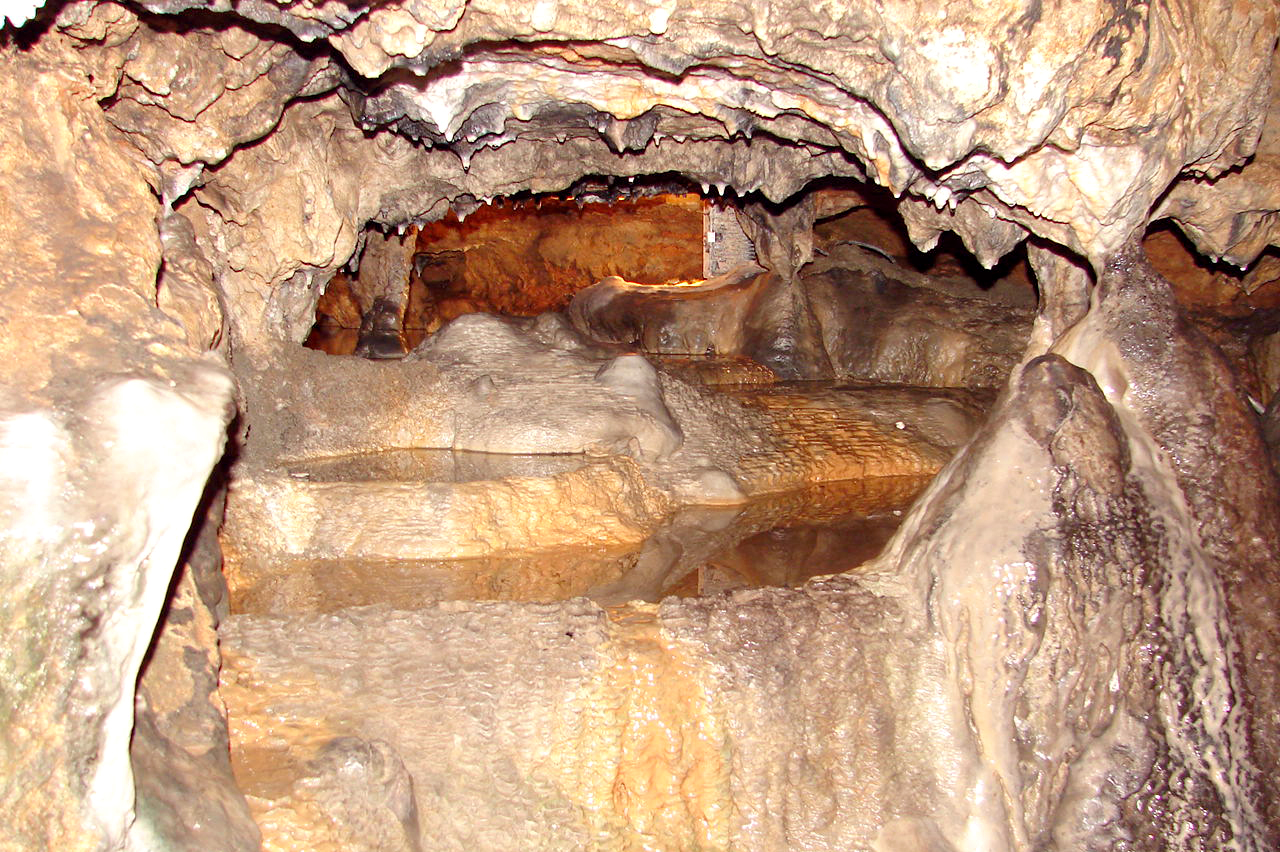
Formations within Gosu Cave

Gosu Cave (Korean: 고수동굴), alternatively Kosu Cave, is a huge limestone cave near Danyang (North Chungcheong Province), South Korea formed over 450 million years ago. It is among the best known natural caves in Korea, and is known as the "underground palace". Gosu Cave is listed as the country's "Natural Monument No. 256".

"Gosu" means "field of tall reeds" and comes from the fact that the area used to be filled with fields of tall grasses. After the cave was discovered in the early 1970s, rough stone instruments were excavated from the cave's entrance, showing that this used to be a home to prehistoric people.

== Features of the cave ==
The cave, 1,300 m/4,264 ft deep, is inhabited by 25 species of insects and animals. About 120 different stalactites and stalagmites are found here. Some of the formations resemble animals or human figures, such as Lion Rock, Octopus Rock, Eagle Rock, and even the Virgin Mary Rock. The Lion Rock is said to be the guardian of the cave. While it has an entire length of 5.4 km/17,716 ft, visitors are limited to exploring up to 1.7 km/5,577 ft of the cave.

The main branch of Gosu Cave is 1,200 m/3,937 ft long. It features a variety of spectacular speleothems: stalactites, stalagmites, columns, cave coral, cave pearls, cave shields, draperies, and aragonite crystals. The main chamber has a series of majestic 10m/33 ft long stalactites.

== Tourism ==
The cave is open to the public every day year-round, and gets the most visitors on hot summer days; the interior of the cave is cool, being a steady 15 °C/59 °F year-round, and in winter gloves are recommended for holding the cool metal railings. A 1.7 km/5,577 ft length of twisting, turning limestone caverns have been outfitted with metal walkways, becoming quite narrow at some points, and subdued lighting. The vertical height of the walkways is 50 m/164 ft.

== Gallery ==
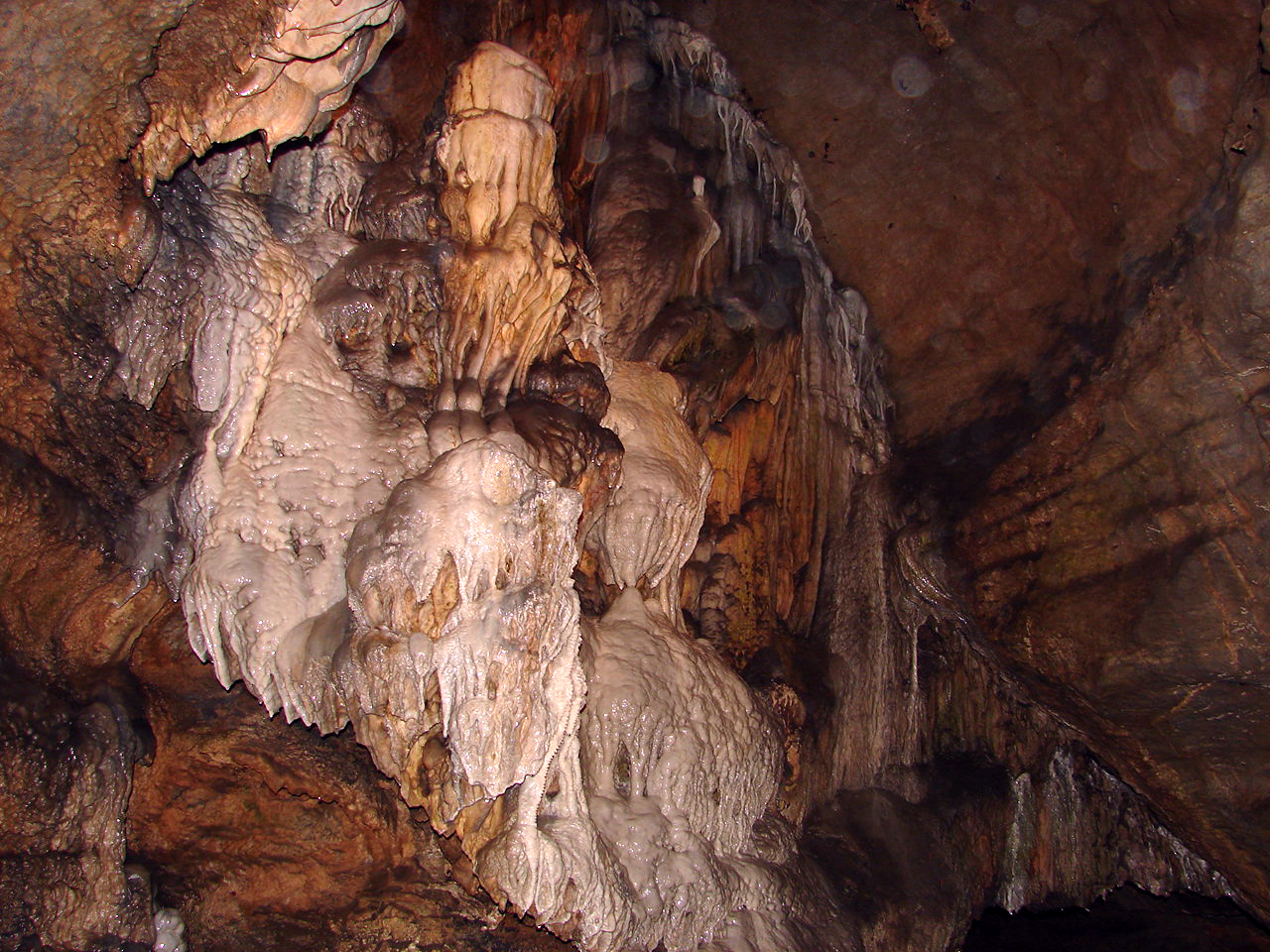

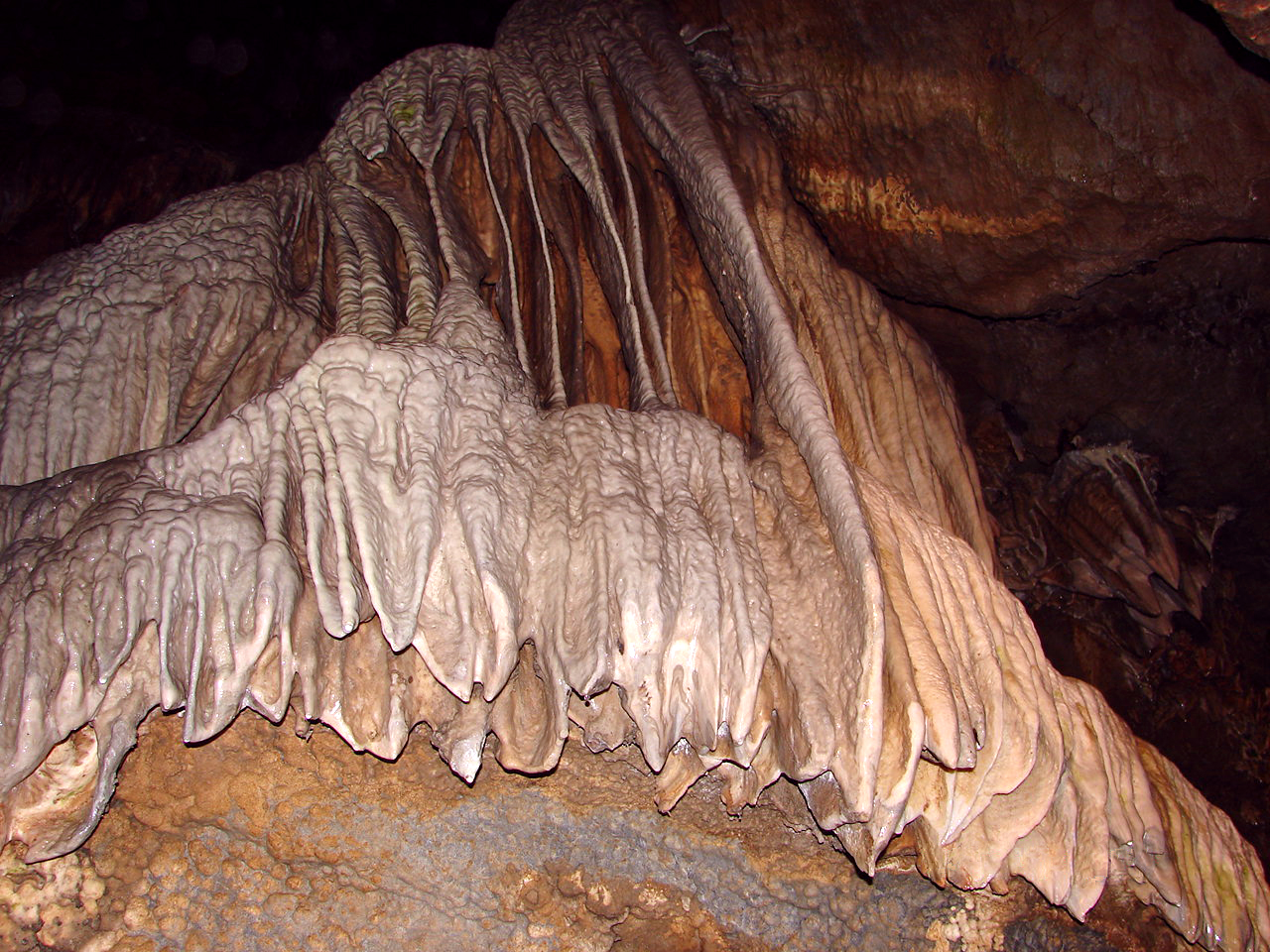

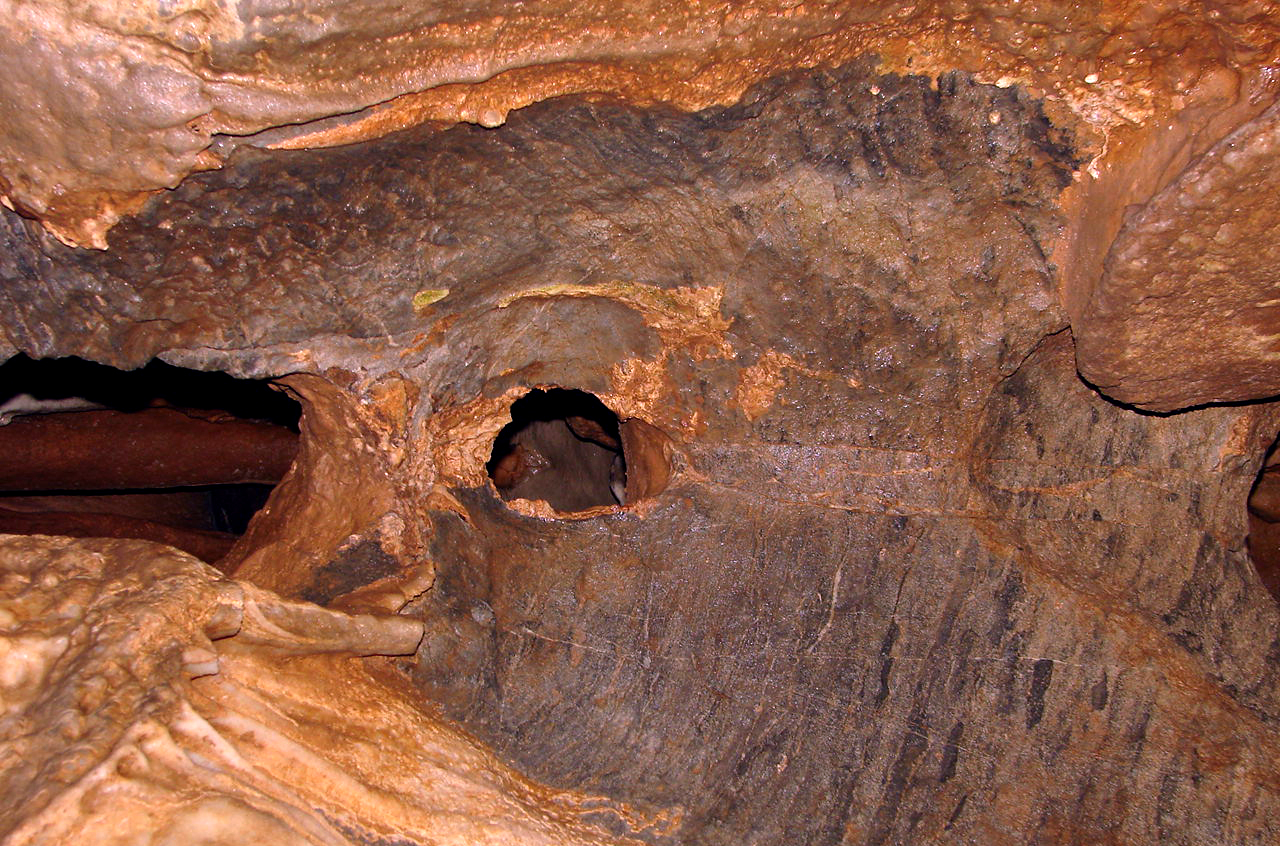

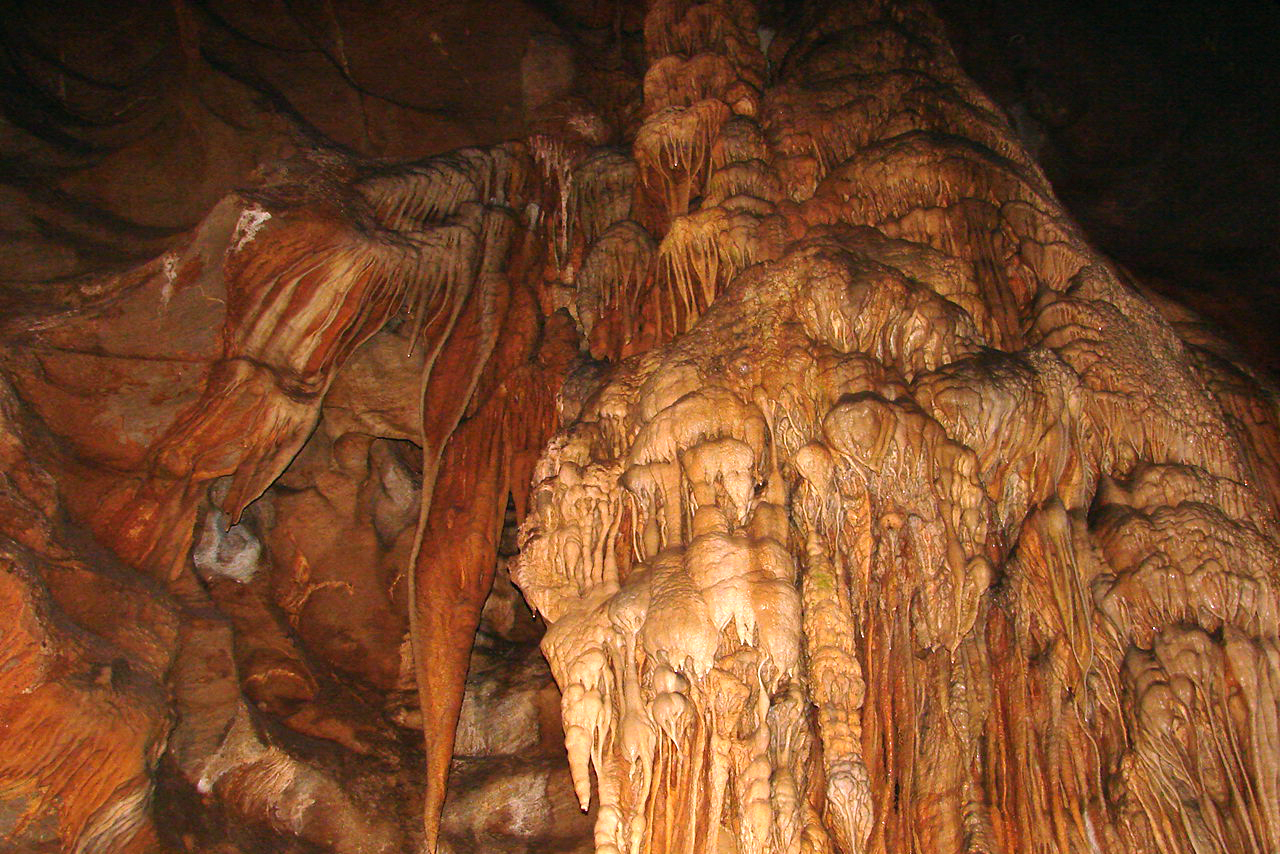

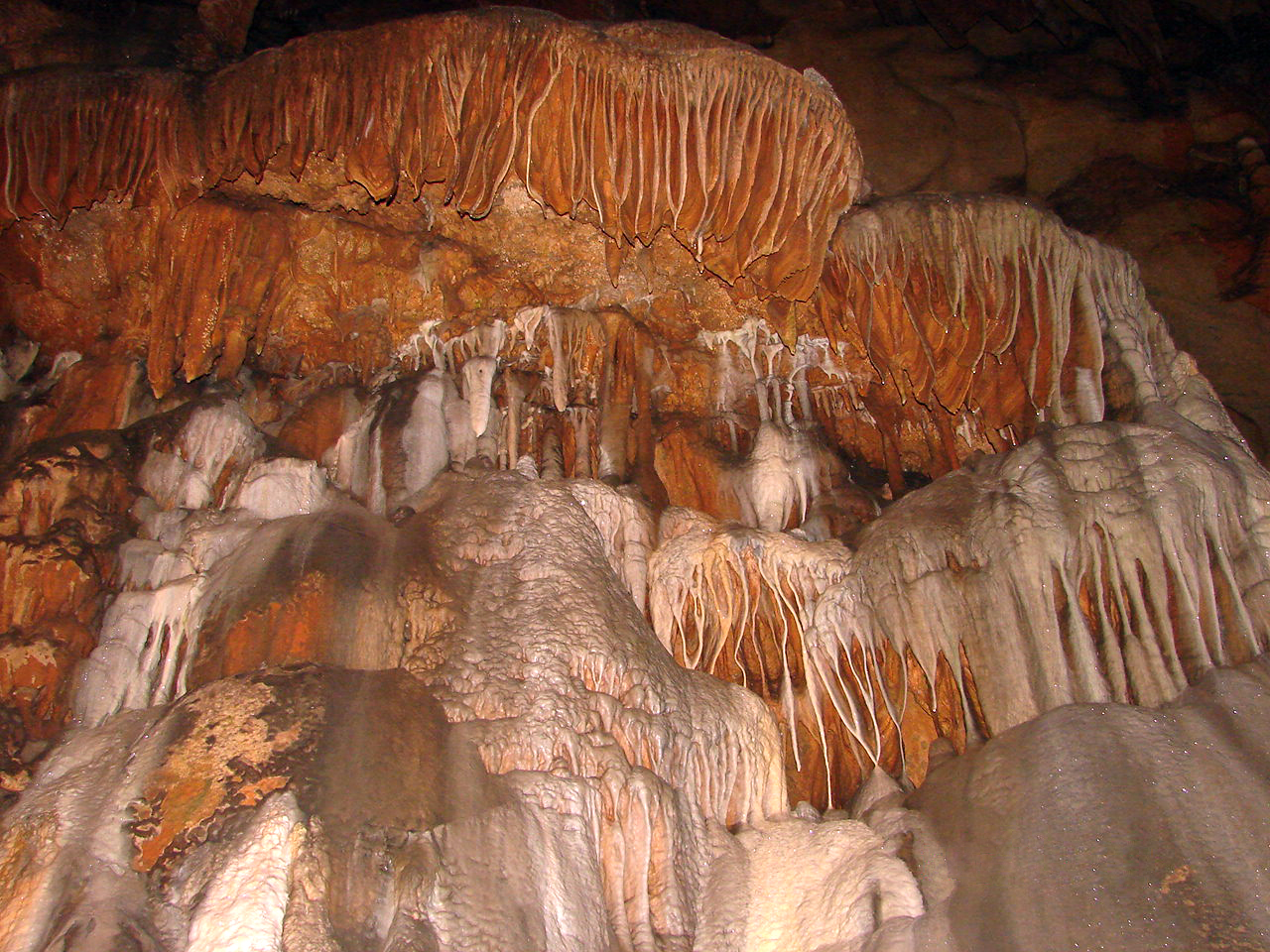

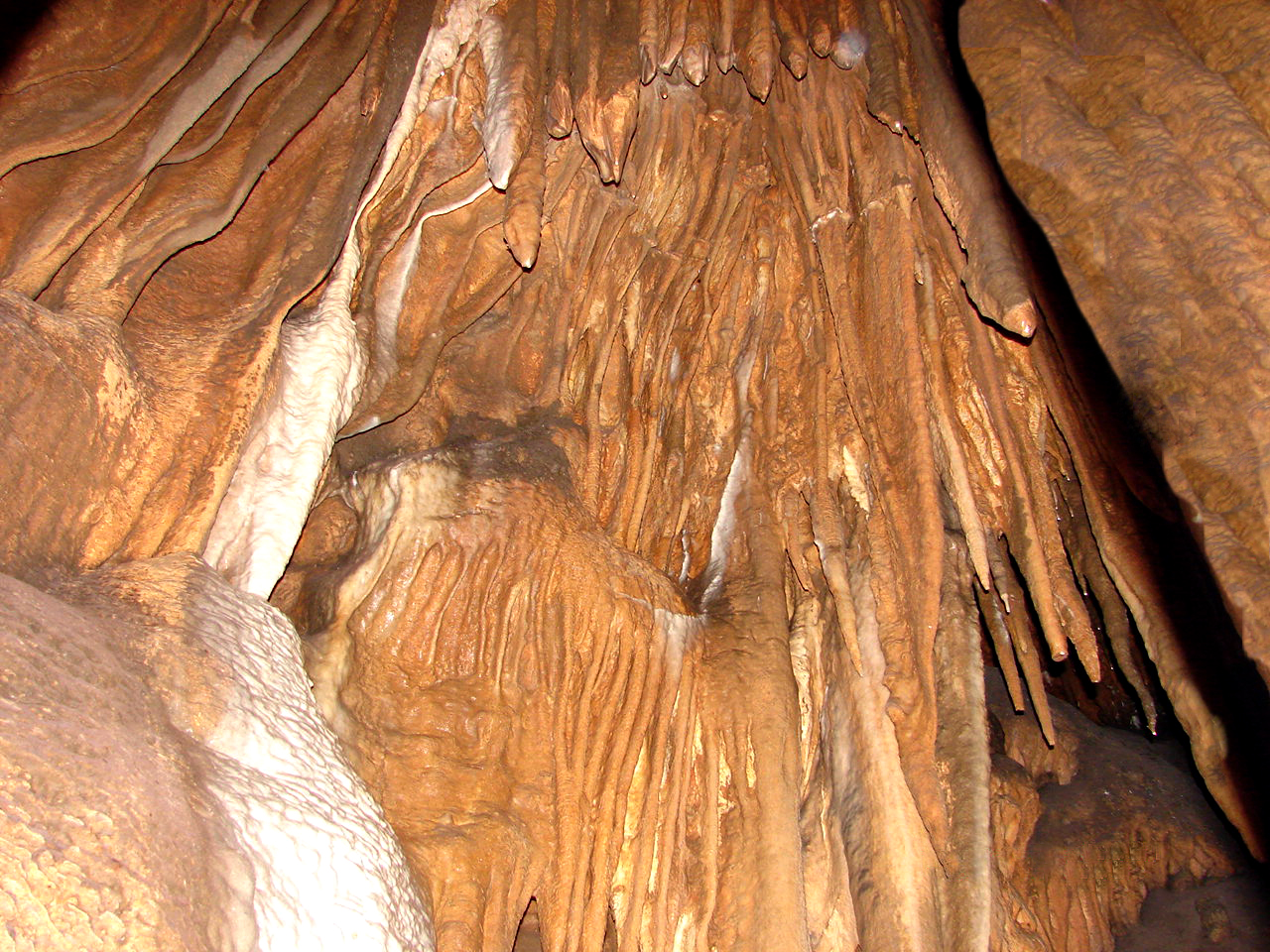

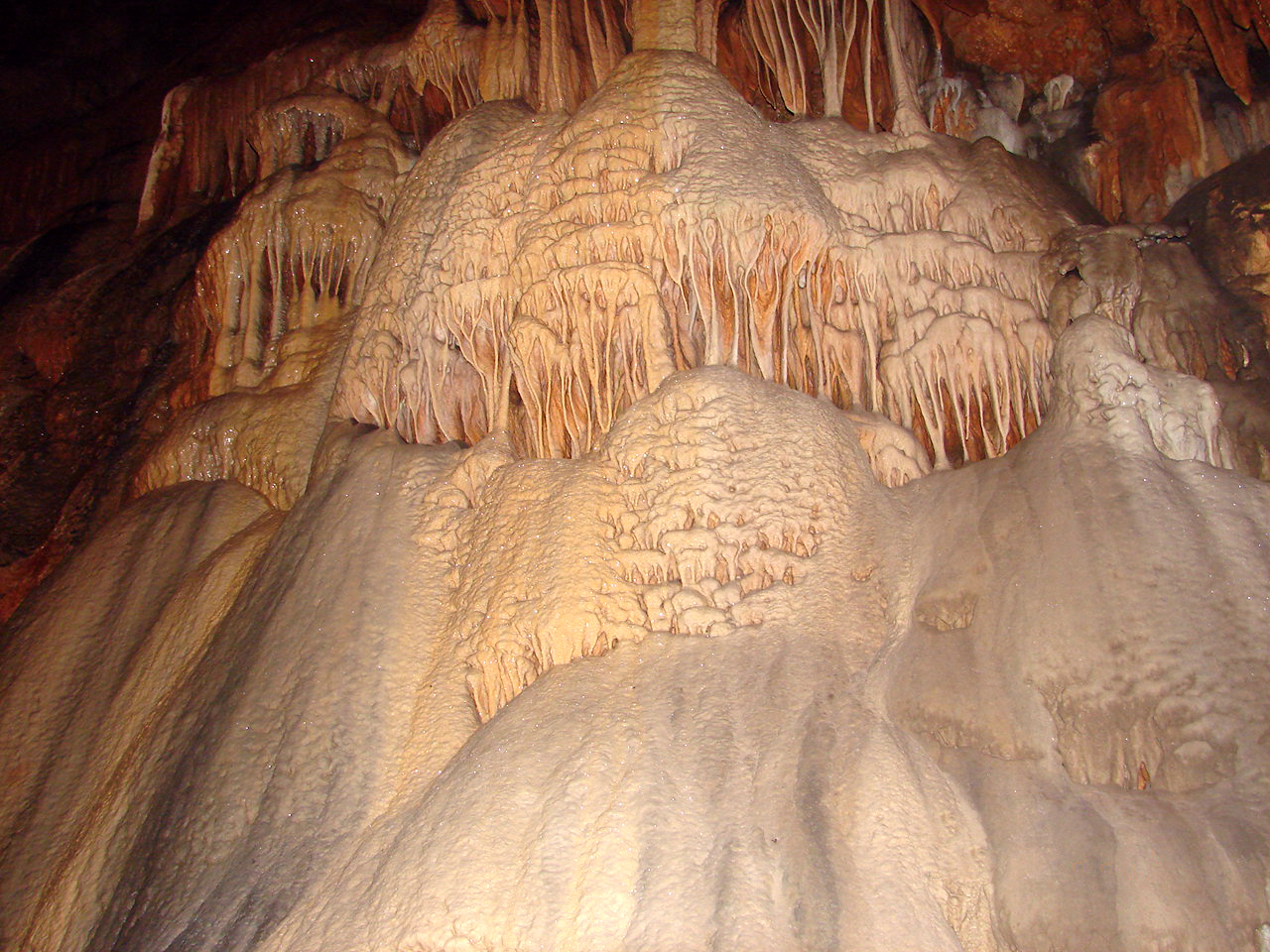

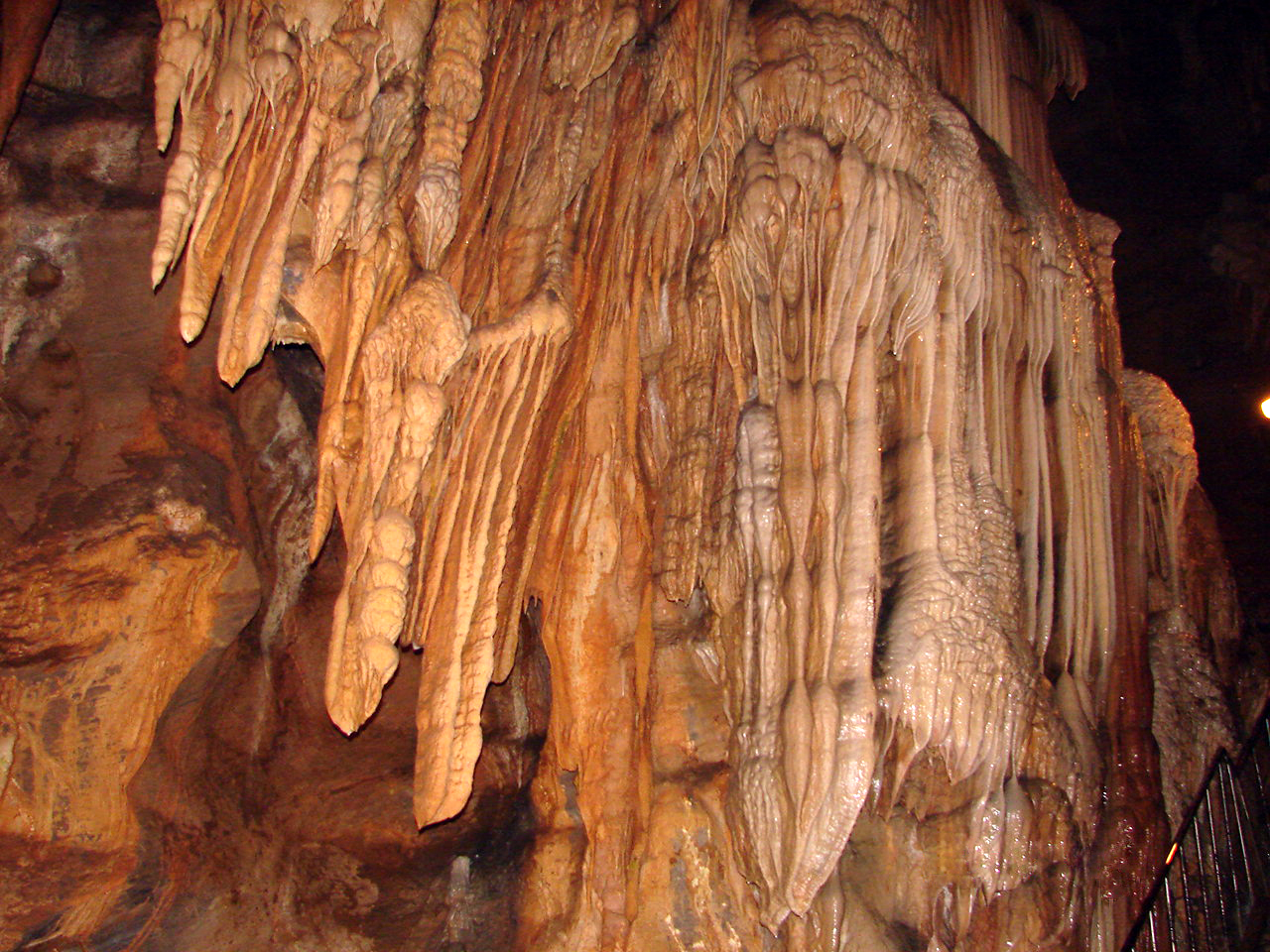
