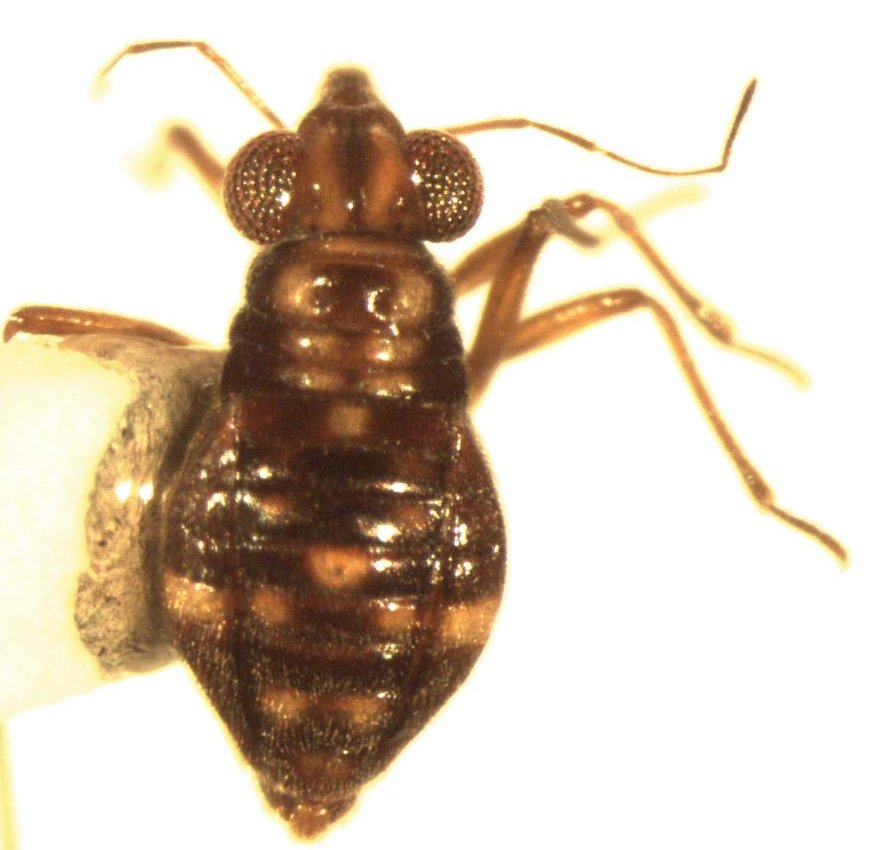
- Mniovelia kuscheli

Scientific classification
- Kingdom: Animalia
- Phylum: Arthropoda
- Clade: Pancrustacea
- Class: Insecta
- Order: Hemiptera
- Suborder: Heteroptera
- Infraorder: Gerromorpha
- Superfamily: Mesovelioidea

Families
- 1 or 2, see text

= Water treader =

Family of true bugs

Water treaders, the superfamily Mesovelioidea, are insects in the order Hemiptera, the true bugs. They are semiaquatic insects that live in moist and wet habitat and on wet plant matter in several types of aquatic habitat.

These insects are no more than 3.5 mm long. They have elongated heads, long antennae, and large eyes, with the exception of Cryptovelia species, which have vestigial eyes. Females are larger than the males of their species and have well-developed ovipositors.

The type genus, Mesovelia, contains about 27 species, many of which are common and widespread. The other genera are small or even monotypic, and are less common.

One species is known for its unique specific name, Cavaticovelia aaa, sometimes called the aaa water treader. It is a legitimate binomial name following the International Code of Zoological Nomenclature, featuring aaa, the Hawaiian word for "lava tube".

According to some treatments, two families (Madeoveliidae and Mesoveliidae) are in the Mesovelioidea. The family Madeoveliidae is often treated as a subfamily of the Mesoveliidae, but molecular studies suggest it is phylogenetically inconsistent, and thus suggest to abandon dividing the two.

- Mesoveliidae – water treaders, pondweed bugs
  - Austrovelia
  - Cavaticovelia
  - Cryptovelia Andersen & Polhemus, 1980
  - Darwinivelia Andersen & Polhemus, 1980
  - Madeovelia Poisson, 1959
  - Mesovelia Mulsant and Rey, 1852
  - Mesoveloidea Hungerford, 1929
  - Mniovelia Andersen & Polhemus, 1980
  - Nereivelia
  - Phrynovelia Horváth, 1915
  - Seychellovelia Andersen & Polhemus, 2003
  - Speovelia Esaki, 1929
