= Echigo Mountains =

Mountain range in Central Japan

Coordinates: 37.1223°N 139.0758°E

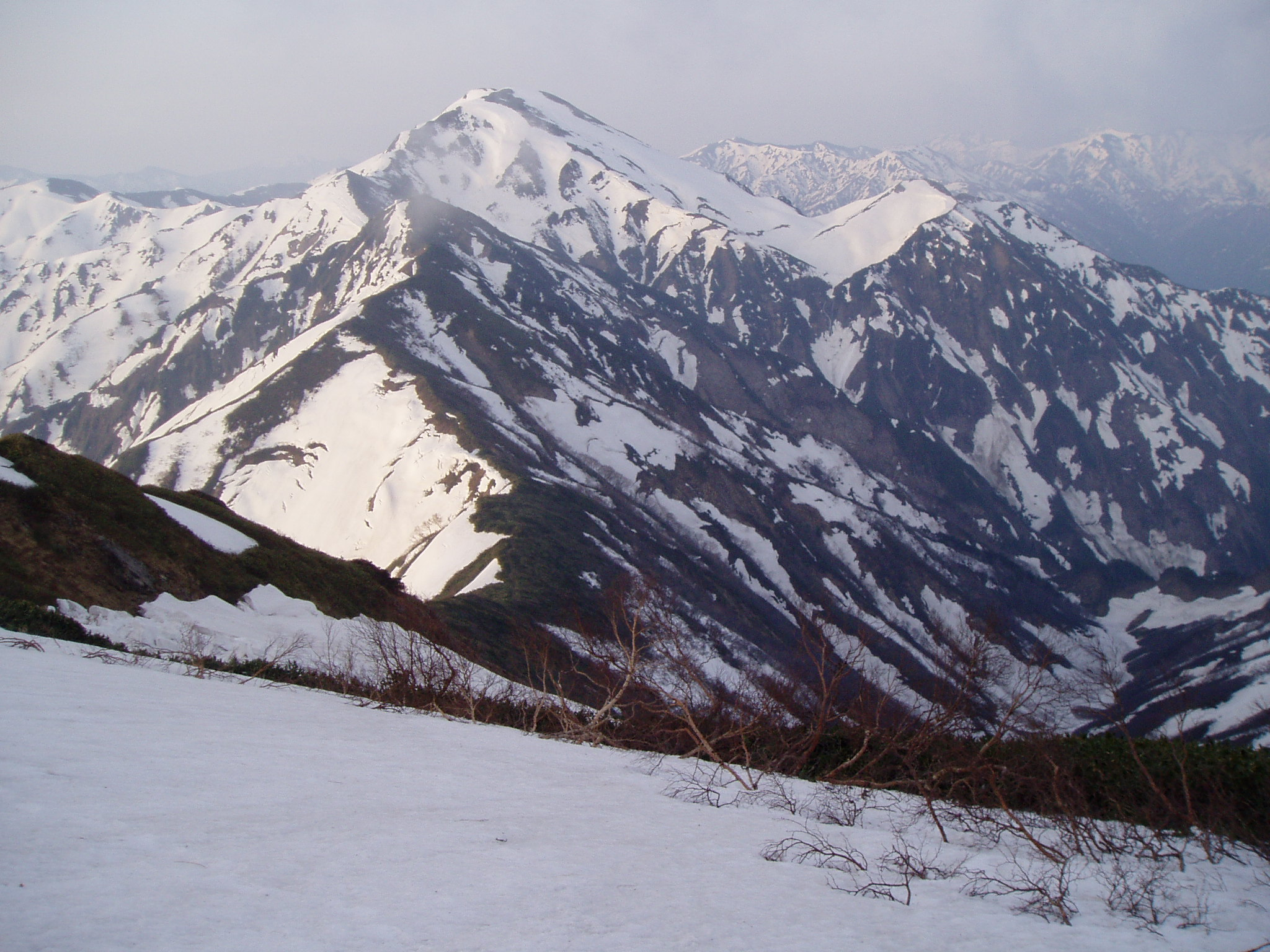
Nakanodake

Location of Echigo Mountains

The Echigo Mountains (Japanese: 越後山脈) are a mountain range that straddle Niigata, Fukushima, and Gunma prefectures in Japan.

== See also ==
- Asahi Mountains (朝日山地)
- Iide Mountains (飯豊山地)
- Mikuni Mountains (三国山脈)
- Taishaku Mountains (帝釈山脈)
