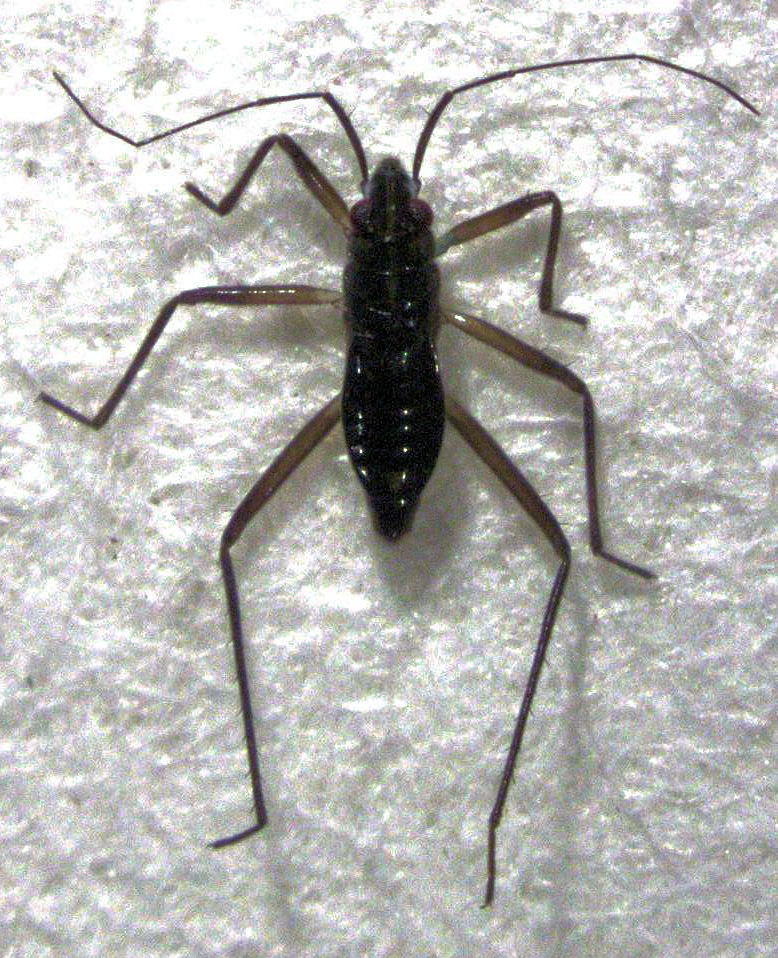
- Mesovelia hackeri

Scientific classification
- Kingdom: Animalia
- Phylum: Arthropoda
- Class: Insecta
- Order: Hemiptera
- Suborder: Heteroptera
- Infraorder: Gerromorpha
- Superfamily: Mesovelioidea
- Family: Mesoveliidae; Douglas & Scott, 1867

Subfamilies
- Madeoveliinae Poisson, 1959; Mesoveliinae Douglas & Scott, 1867

= Mesoveliidae =

Mesoveliidae Temporal range: Late Jurassic–Recent

Family of true bugs

Mesoveliidae is a family of water treaders in the order Hemiptera. There are about 16 genera and at least 50 described species in Mesoveliidae.

== Genera ==
These 12 extant genera belong to the family Mesoveliidae.

- Austrovelia Malipatil and Monteith, 1983
- Cavaticovelia Andersen and J. Polhemus, 1980
- Cryptovelia Andersen and J. Polhemus, 1980
- Darwinivelia Andersen and J. Polhemus, 1980
- Madeovelia Poisson, 1959
- Mesovelia Mulsant & Rey, 1852
- Mesoveloidea Hungerford, 1929
- Mniovelia Andersen and J. Polhemus, 1980
- Nereivelia J. Polhemus and D. Polhemus, 1989
- Phrynovelia Horváth, 1915
- Seychellovelia Andersen and D. Polhemus, 2003
- Speovelia Esaki, 1929

While traditionally divided in two subfamilies, Madeoveliinae (including Madeovelia and Mesoveloidea) and Mesoveliinae (all other genera), molecular phylogenetics suggests Mesoveliinae are polyphyletic and thus the subfamily-level classification should be abandoned.

=== Fossil genera ===
- †Duncanovelia Jell & Duncan, 1986
- †Gallomesovelia Nel et al., 2014 France, Late Jurassic (Kimmeridgian)
- †Malenavelia Solórzano, Kraemer, & Perrichot, 2014 Charantese amber, France, Late Cretaceous (Cenomanian)
- †Emilianovelia Solórzano, Kraemer, & Perrichot 2014 Charantese amber, France, Late Cretaceous (Cenomanian)
- †Glaesivelia Sánchez-García & Solórzano Kraemer, 2017 Spanish amber, Early Cretaceous (Albian)
- †Iberovelia Sánchez-García & Nel, 2017 Spanish amber, Early Cretaceous (Albian)
- †Sinovelia Yao, Zhang, & Ren, 2012, Early Cretaceous (Yixian)
- †Cretamesovelia Boderau et al., 2024 Kachin amber, Myanmar, mid-Cretaceous
- †Myanmarvelia Boderau et al., 2023 Kachin amber, Myanmar, mid-Cretaceous
