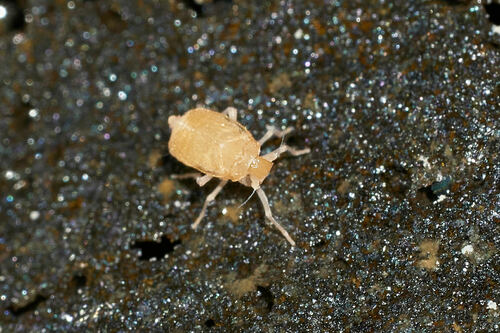

Conservation status
- Critically Imperiled (NatureServe)

Scientific classification
- Domain: Eukaryota
- Kingdom: Animalia
- Phylum: Arthropoda
- Class: Insecta
- Order: Hemiptera
- Suborder: Auchenorrhyncha
- Infraorder: Fulgoromorpha
- Family: Cixiidae
- Genus: Oliarus
- Species: O. polyphemus

Binomial name
- Oliarus polyphemus Fennah 1973

= Oliarus polyphemus =

Species of planthopper

Oliarus polyphemus, the Hawai'i cave planthopper, is a species of Oliarus planthopper endemic to the island of Hawai'i, where it inhabits lava tubes and crevice networks embedded in solidified lava flows.

== Description ==
Oliarus polyphemus is completely pale and unpigmented. It has no eyes and as such is completely blind. Individuals range from 3.2-5mm in length, with females being larger than males. Adults are flightless.

== Distribution and habitat ==
Olarius polyphemus is only found on the island of Hawai'i. It is thought to live primarily in a vast network of underground cooling cracks formed when pahoehoe lava from the island's various volcanoes solidified. This crevice habitat is thought to be the primary habitat of O. polyphemus and other Hawai'i cave endemic arthropods, but individuals often enter large lava tube caves. Due to the difficulty of surveying the primary crevice habitat, O. polyphemus is only ever encountered in these lava tubes.

This species is capable of colonizing newly formed lava tubes and crevice networks relatively quickly after they are formed by a volcanic eruption. For example, cave planthoppers have been present in Kaumana Cave (which was created by a 1888 Mauna Loa eruption) since at least 1972 and likely much longer.

== Ecology ==
Olarius polyphemus relies on the roots of the ʻōhiʻa tree, which reach deep underground into the lava tubes and cooling cracks that the planthoppers inhabit. Nymphs feed by sucking sap from older roots, making a wax filament cocoon to protect itself while it feeds. When it is finished feeding, a nymph builds another cocoon and spend about one week transforming into an adult. Adults probably do not feed and rely on stored fat reserves for energy.

O. polyphemus is sometimes killed by an unknown parasitic fungus.

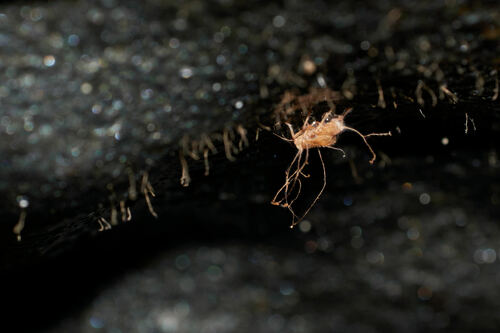
Adult Hawai'i cave planthopper being parasitized by an unknown fungus
