= Cucumber beetle =

Common name for several species of beetles

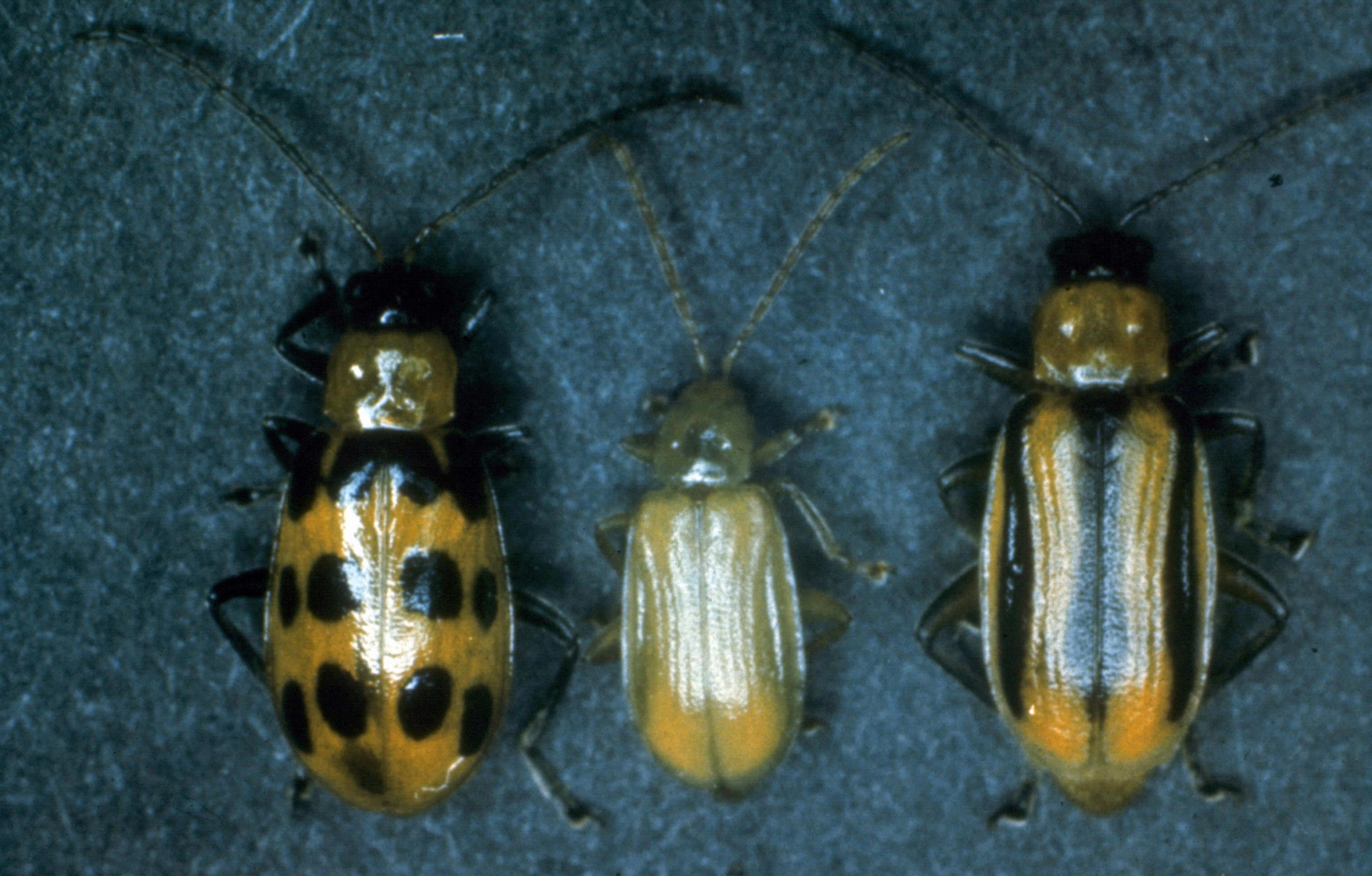
Spotted cucumber beetle, northern corn rootworm beetle, and western corn rootworm beetle

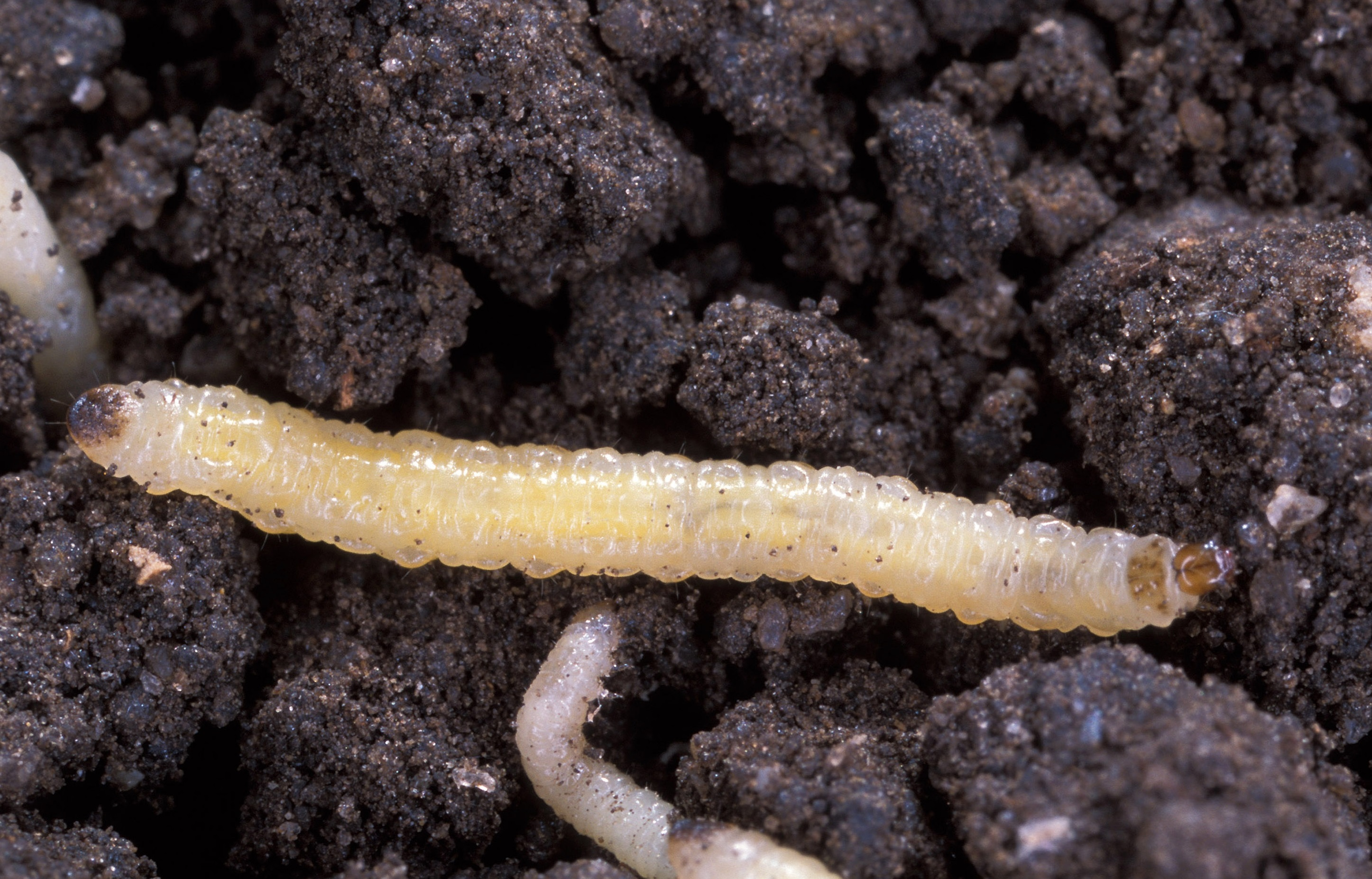
Western corn rootworm

Cucumber beetle is a common name given to members of two genera of beetles, Diabrotica and Acalymma, both in the family Chrysomelidae. The adults can be found on cucurbits such as cucumbers and a variety of other plants. Many are notorious pests of agricultural crops. The larvae of several cucumber beetles are known as corn rootworms.

Some well-known pests include the western corn rootworm (D. virgifera virgifera), the spotted cucumber beetle and its larva, the southern corn rootworm (D. undecimpunctata), the cucurbit beetle (D. speciosa), the banded cucumber beetle (D. balteata), the northern corn rootworm (D. barberi), the striped cucumber beetle (A. vittatum), and the western striped cucumber beetle (A. trivittatum).

The insects live about eight weeks, during which time both larva and adult feed on plants. Adults will attack the tender young growth of stems and leaves, and the buds and petals on mature specimens. They also carry and spread the bacterial wilt organism Erwinia tracheiphila and the cucumber mosaic virus. Eggs are laid in clusters on the undersides of host leaves and hatch into larvae 1/2 inch (13 mm) long. The larvae often tunnel into the soil to attack roots.

Cucumber beetles can overwinter in crop fields or in compost or trash piles. Eradication efforts may include manual removal, clearing cultivated areas of litter, debris, and infested plants, and application of pyrethrin-containing insecticides such as cyfluthrin or non-systemic organophosphate insecticides such as malathion.
