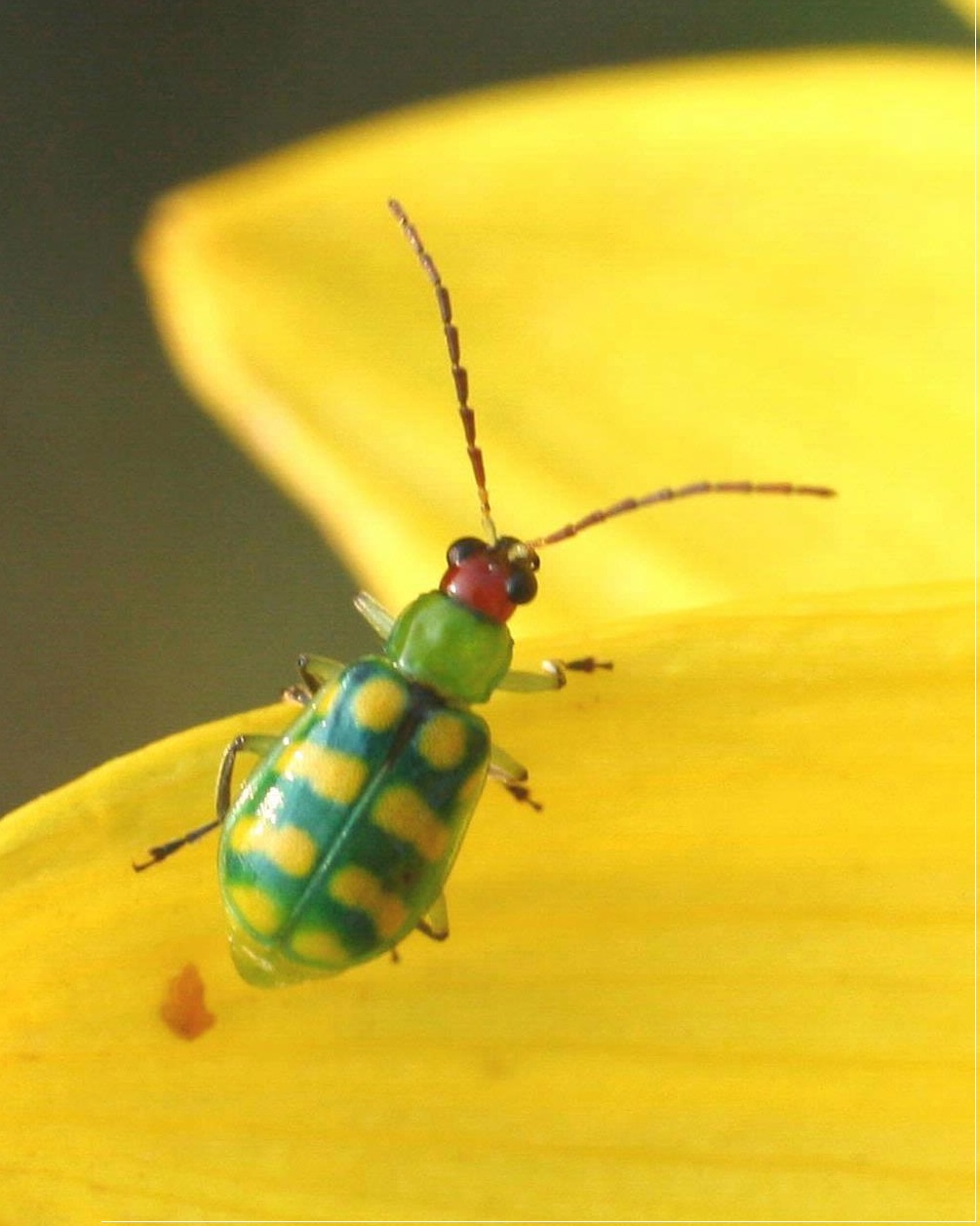

Scientific classification
- Kingdom: Animalia
- Phylum: Arthropoda
- Class: Insecta
- Order: Coleoptera
- Suborder: Polyphaga
- Infraorder: Cucujiformia
- Family: Chrysomelidae
- Genus: Diabrotica
- Species: D. balteata

Binomial name
- Diabrotica balteata LeConte, 1865

= Diabrotica balteata =

Species of beetle

Diabrotica balteata is a species of cucumber beetle in the family Chrysomelidae known commonly as the banded cucumber beetle. It occurs in the Americas, where its distribution extends from the United States to Colombia and Venezuela in South America. It is also present in Cuba. It is a pest of a variety of agricultural crops.

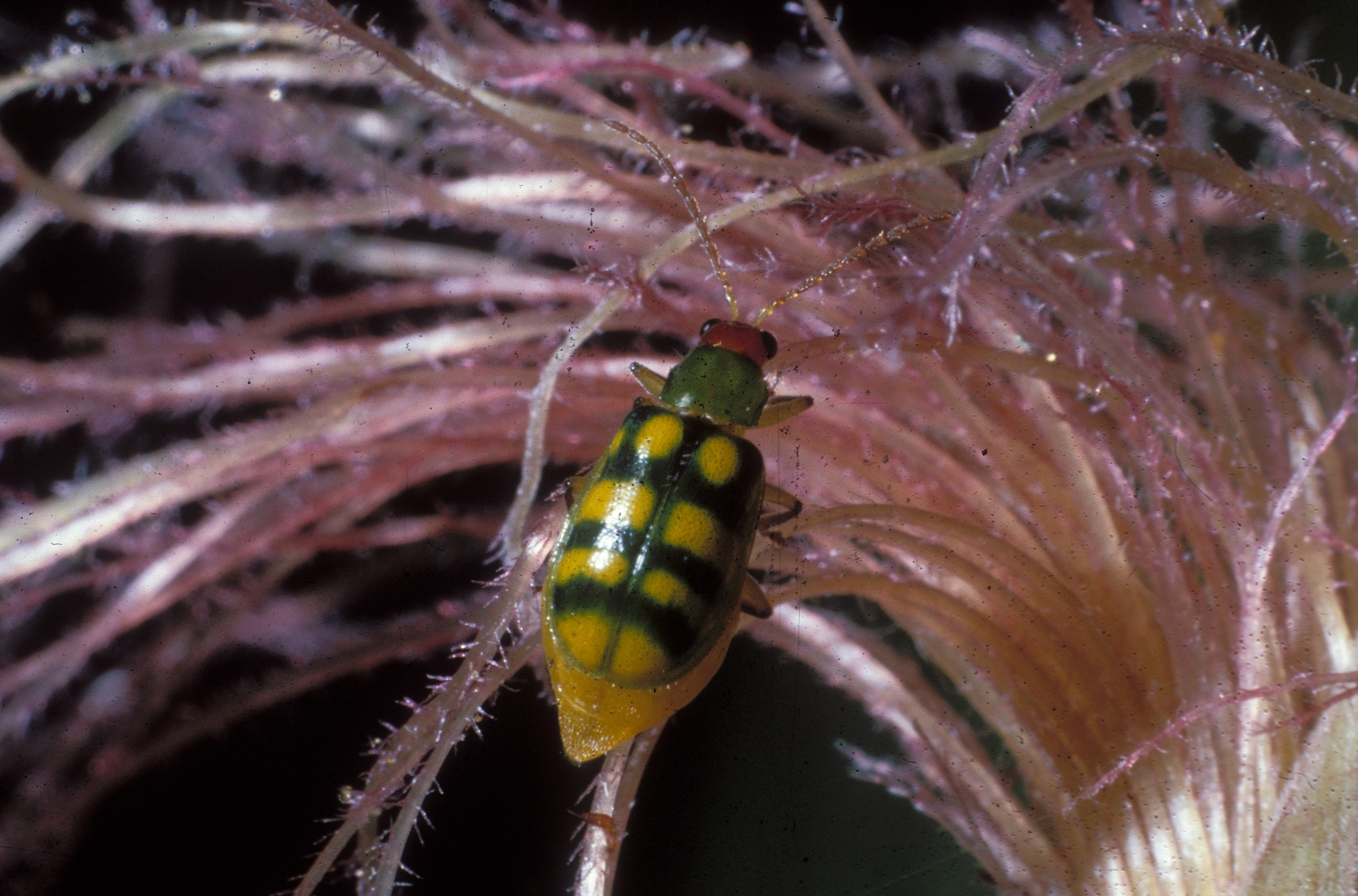
On corn silk

== Description and life cycle ==
This beetle is 5 to 6 millimeters long. It has a red head and black thorax. The elytra are yellow, marked with three transverse bands in shades of green or blue-green and a narrower longitudinal green line down the center. The pattern of banding is variable and nearly absent in some individuals. The color of the elytra is influenced by the types of plants the beetle eats. The larva is also variable and has three instars. The new larva is white and about 2.3 millimeters long. It may turn yellow as it consumes plant material. The later-instar larva may reach nearly 9 millimeters.

The adult mates at about six days of age. The female begins producing eggs about 16 days later. She lays a cluster of eggs every few days for two to eight weeks, producing up to 15 clusters, for a maximum of 850 eggs. A cluster has up to 100 oval yellow eggs each about half a millimeter long. The female oviposits the cluster in a crack in the soil, and the eggs hatch in 5 to 9 days. The larva develops for 11 to 17 days, pupation takes 4 to 6 days, and the adult has an average life span of 26 days. There is no diapause. In the best conditions there can be six or seven generations per year.

In Tamaulipas, Mexico, the beetle is most commonly observed in May through July. This may be a time of high dispersal. Abundance is apparently increased by late spring and summer rainfall, and flight activity increases with wind speed.

== Distribution ==
The beetle likely originated in the tropical Americas and has moved into more temperate climates. By the early 1900s it was limited to Arizona and Texas in the United States. During the 1920s it spread up the coast of California at a rate of about 25 miles per year. It has since spread as far as North Carolina and Florida. It probably will not progress farther in the continental United States because it does not tolerate freezing temperatures.

== Host plants ==
The larva eats the roots and tubers of plants. The adult feeds on most plant parts, such as leaves, seedling cotyledons, fruits, and flower parts, including corn silk.

A polyphagous species, this beetle has a variety of host plants from several different families. Among its primary hosts are cucurbits such as cucumber, melon, squash, gourd, and pumpkin, beans such as common bean and lima bean, sweet potato, soybean, and winged bean. Secondary hosts include tomato, potato, cassava, rice, sorghum, wheat, maize, and crucifers such as cabbages.

Other known wild and cultivated host plants include amaranth, peanut, crownbeard, watermelon, silverleaf nightshade, bell pepper, mulberry, pea, beet, okra, onion, and lettuce.

== Impacts ==
The beetle causes the most serious damage to plants when the adult defoliates them and the larva attacks the roots, especially in seedlings. The larva is very damaging to the root tuber of the sweet potato. It riddles the tuber with holes which expand as the root grows, turning into craters. Such root damage reduces plant growth and fruit production, and it makes the crop less marketable.

Another consequence of beetle damage to plants is viral and bacterial infection. Even if the actual damage is minor, the injury can facilitate the entry of pathogens that can be lethal to the plant. This beetle is a vector for the pathogens that cause many forms of plant disease, including cowpea mosaic virus, cowpea severe mosaic virus, cowpea chlorotic mottle virus, bean rugose mosaic virus, bean mild mosaic virus, quail pea mosaic virus, squash mosaic virus, melon necrotic spot virus, and bacterial wilt.

Insecticides are used to control this species, mainly to target the larvae in the roots. The mermithid nematode Filipjevimermis leipsandra has been studied as a possible agent of biological pest control. Another entomopathogenic nematode, Steinernema carpocapsae, will also attack this species.

Some plants are more resistant to the beetle than others. It was noted that in romaine lettuce crops, the cultivar 'Valmaine' is resistant to attack, while 'Tall Guzmaine' is not. Later studies suggest that the latex produced by 'Valmaine' is repellent to the beetle.

== Ecology ==
Natural enemies of the beetle include ants, which prey on its eggs, particularly in the tropics. A Heterorhabditis nematode isolated from the larva of this beetle has been demonstrated to be a parasite that causes rapid mortality. It is also a host to the tachinid fly parasitoid Celatoria compressa.

== Names ==
Other common names for the insect include belted cucumber beetle in English, tortuguilla de franjas verdes del pepino, mayatito con bandas verdes, catarinita doradilla, and gusano alfilerillo in Spanish, and chrysomélide rayée du conconbre in French.
