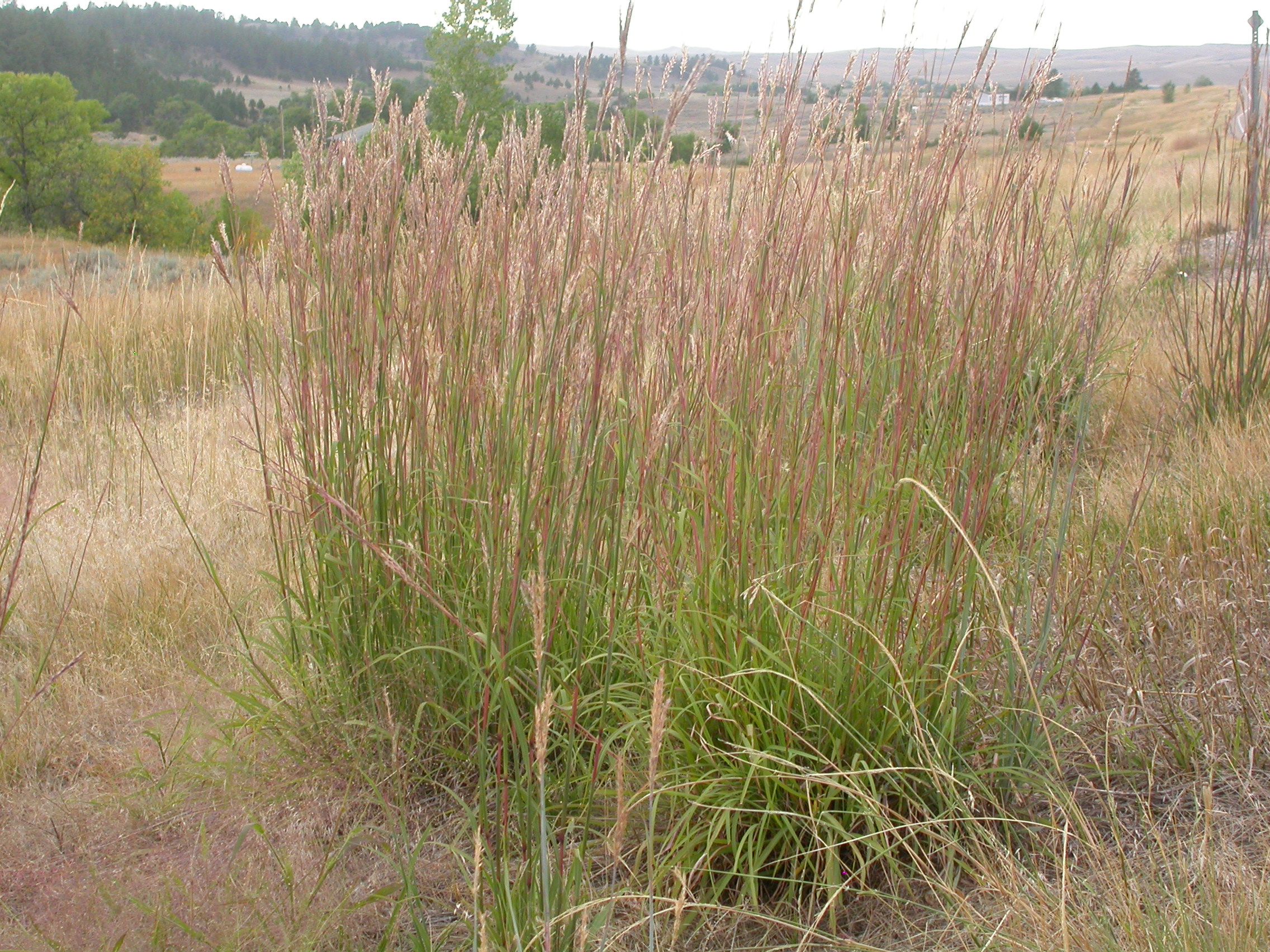

Conservation status
- Secure (NatureServe)

Scientific classification
- Kingdom: Plantae
- Clade: Tracheophytes
- Clade: Angiosperms
- Clade: Monocots
- Clade: Commelinids
- Order: Poales
- Family: Poaceae
- Subfamily: Panicoideae
- Genus: Andropogon
- Species: A. gerardii

Binomial name
- Andropogon gerardii Vitman

Synonyms
- List: Andropogon chrysocomus Nash; Andropogon furcatus Muhl. ex Willd.; Andropogon gerardi nothosubsp. chrysocomus (Nash) Wipff; Andropogon gerardi var. chrysocomus (Nash) Fernald; Andropogon hallii var. grandiflorus Scribn.; Andropogon hondurensis (R.W.Pohl) Wipff; Andropogon provincialis Lam.; Andropogon provincialis var. chrysocomus (Nash) Fernald & Griscom; Andropogon provincialis subvar. furcatus (Muhl. ex Willd.) Hack.; Andropogon provincialis subvar. lindheimeri Hack.; Andropogon provincialis subvar. pycnanthus Hack.; Andropogon provincialis var. tennesseensis Scribn.; Andropogon tennesseensis (Scribn.) Scribn.; Leptopogon furcatus (Muhl. ex Willd.) Roberty

= Andropogon gerardi =

Species of grass

Andropogon gerardi, commonly known as big bluestem, is a species of tall grass native to much of the Great Plains and grassland regions of central and eastern North America. It is also known as tall bluestem, bluejoint, and turkeyfoot.

== Description ==
Big bluestem is a perennial warm-season bunchgrass. It is tolerant of a wide range of soil conditions. The main roots are 1.8–3 meters (6–10 feet) deep, and the plants send out strong, tough rhizomes, so it forms very strong sod. Depending on soil and moisture conditions, it grows to a height of 1–3 m (3 1/2–10 ft). The stem base turns blue or purple as it matures.

Big bluestem blooms in the summer and seeds into the fall. The inflorescence (cluster of flowers) is a raceme of two to six, most commonly three, narrow spike-like racemes alternately arranged along the top of the stem. It somewhat resembles a wild turkey's foot. Each raceme contains pairs of spikelets. Each pair has a stalked spikelet with another stalkless spikelet at the base of the stalk. The stalkless spikelet usually has a fertile, perfect floret (with both female and male parts) and an awn (bristle), and the stalked spikelet is awnless, and is sterile or has a staminate (male) flower.

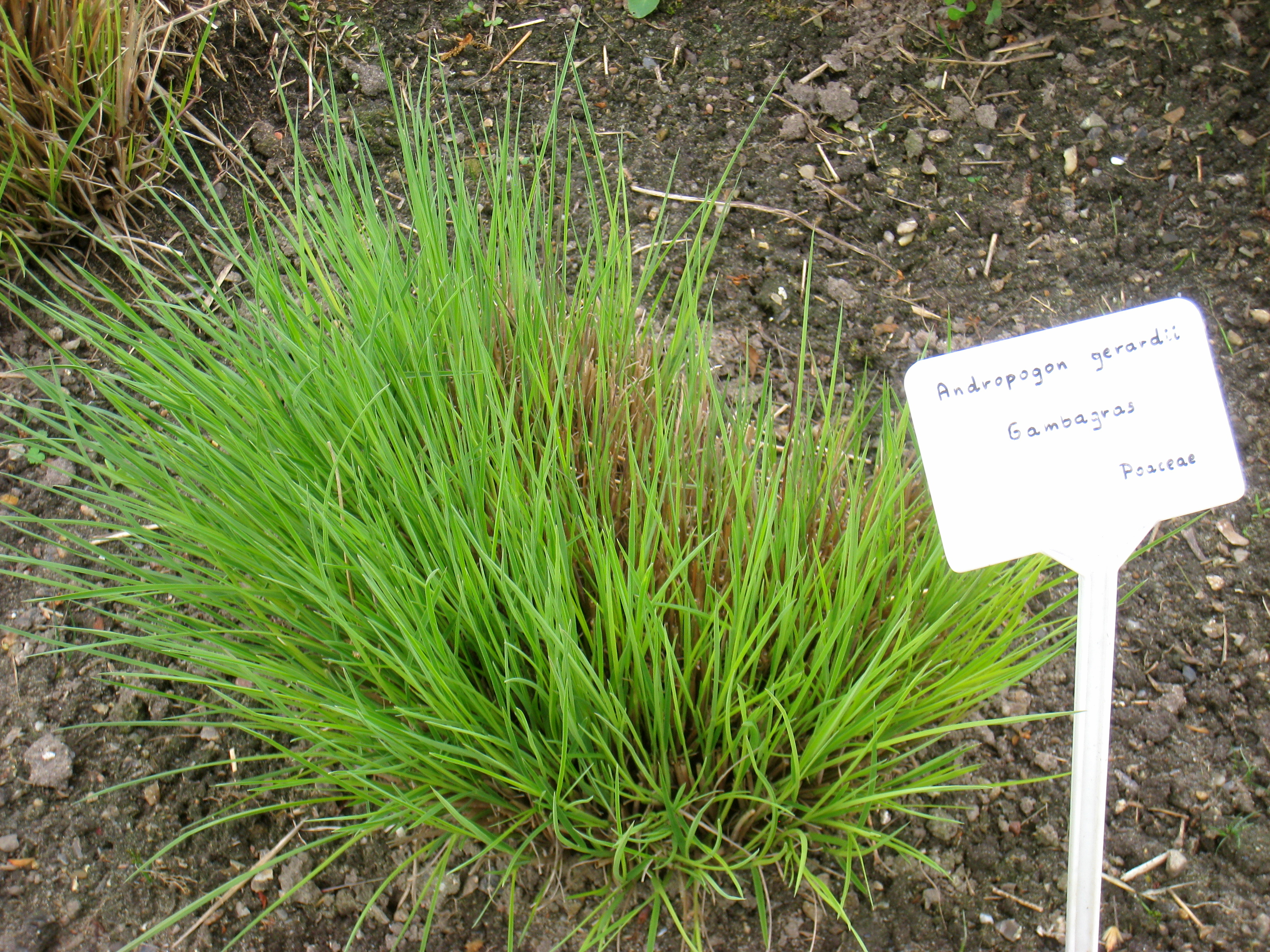
New growth in May at the Berlin Botanical Garden

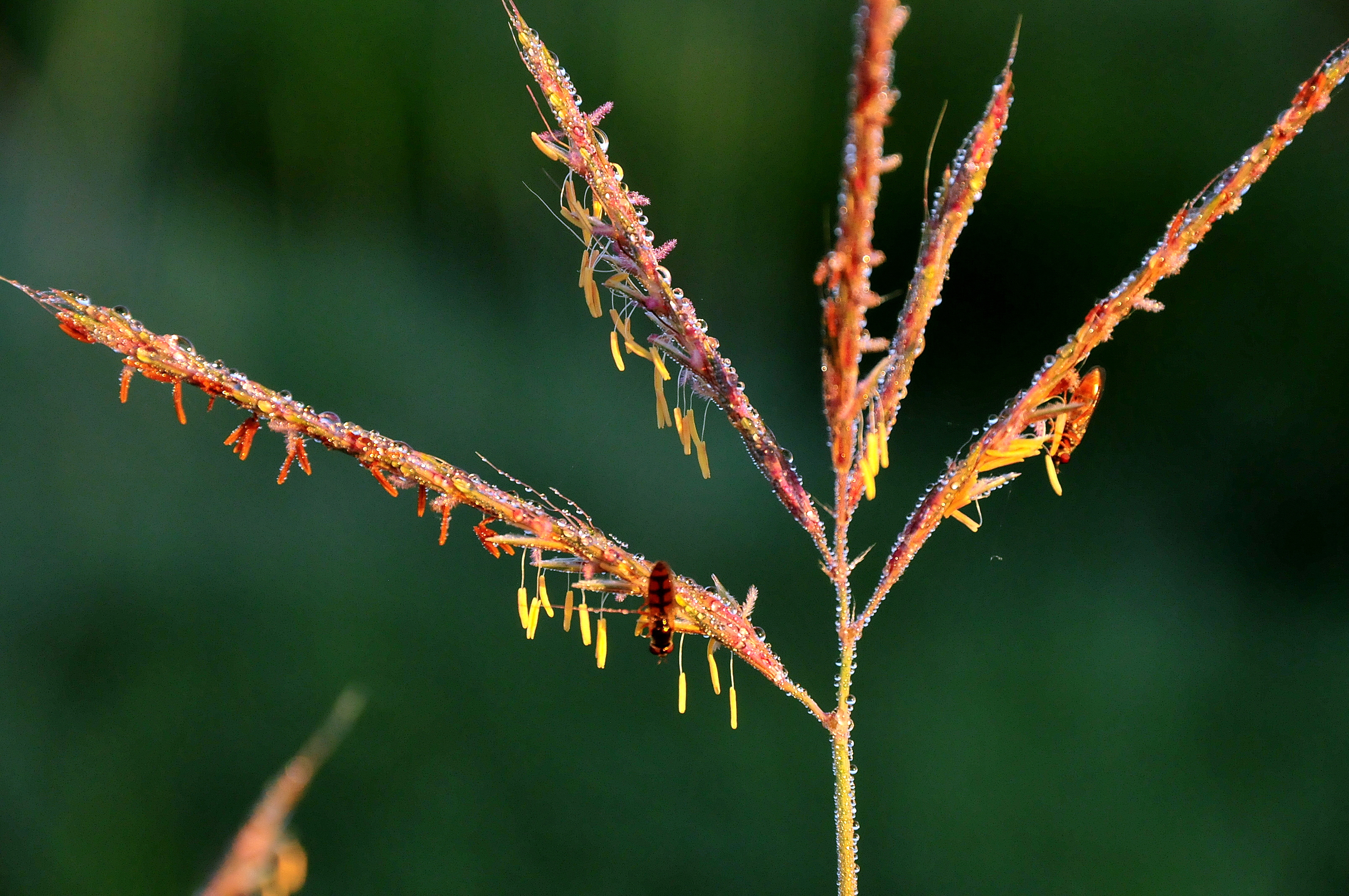
The flowerhead in bloom

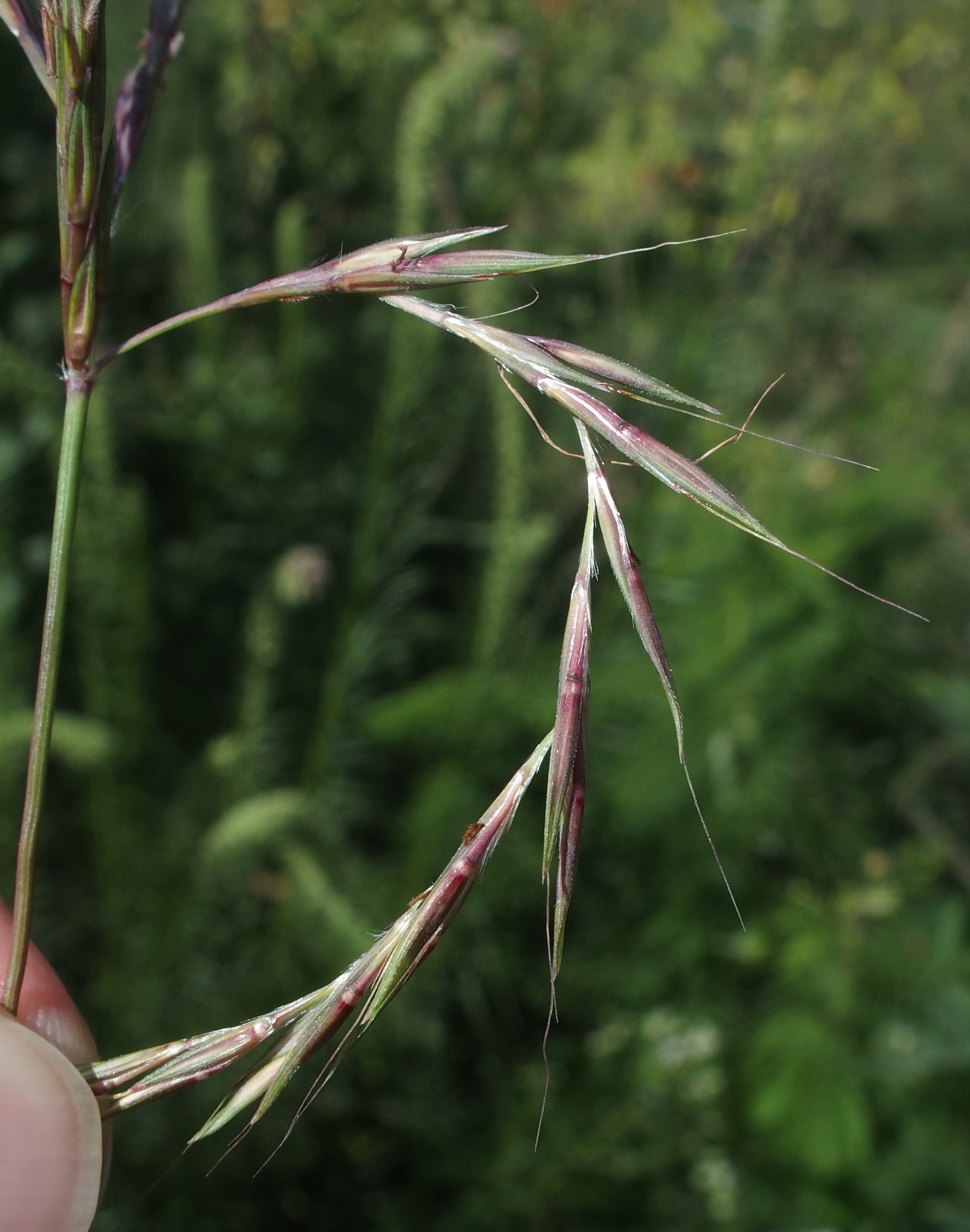
The spike-like raceme bent to show the pairs of spikelets

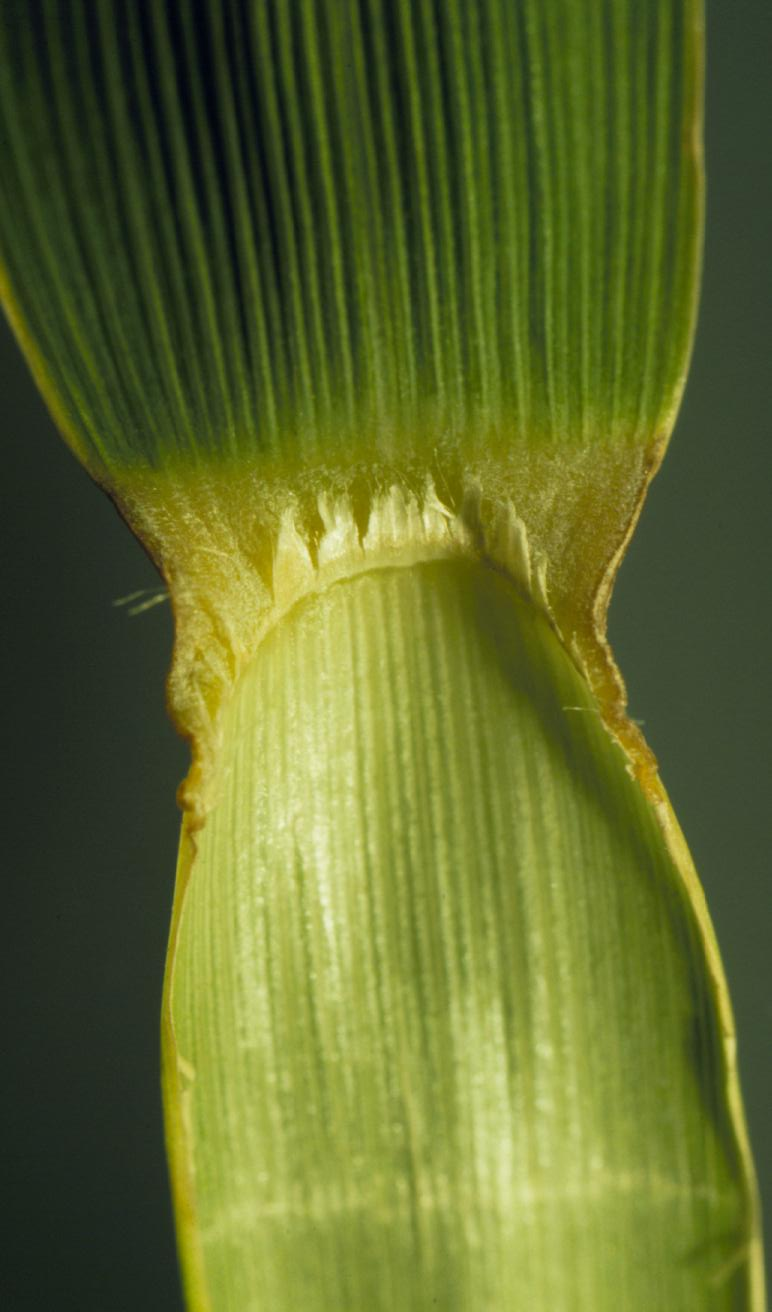
Ligule

== Taxonomy ==
Andropogon gerardi was formally named in 1792 by Fulgenzio Vitman. It was named for French botanist Louis Gérard, who had first described the plant from specimens that had been cultivated in Provence, France.

Kew's International Plant Names Index and the United States Department of Agriculture (USDA) Germplasm Resources Information Network reject the spelling gerardii and provide reasoning for gerardi as being the correct spelling for the specific epithet of this taxon. Andropogon gerardii still makes appearances in various literature, including other USDA publications.

== Ecology ==
Big bluestem is a mid-successional grass in prairie and other grassland ecosystems. It grows in tall, dense stands that can outcompete other plant species. The stands grow until disturbance interrupts their spread. It is shade intolerant and is adapted to fire.

It is a host to larvae of several species of butterflies, including the arogos skipper, byssus skipper, cobweb skipper, common wood nymph, Delaware skipper, and dusted skipper.

The larvae of the leaf beetle Diabrotica cristata feed on the roots and the adults visit the flowers of other species of prairie flowers. Many ants decorate their nests with the seeds, including Formica glacialis, F. montana, and F. subsericea. Several species of ants, such as F. glacialis, F. montana, F. subsericea, Lasius minutus, and L. umbratus build nests around the base of this bunchgrass, forming large soil mounds. In larger mounds, the nest is shared by multiple species of ants, and is "likened to an apartment complex with each ant species in its own nest partition". Up to 12 species of ants have been recorded in mounds found in the Chicago region.

The rust fungus Puccinia andropogonis forms black telia on the leaves.

== Uses ==
The grass and its variants are good forage for horses and cattle, and can also be cut and used for hay. The grass is high in protein. While not considered the highest quality native forage found in the US, it has long been considered a desirable and ecologically important grass by cattle ranchers and rangeland ecologists.

Big bluestem is cultivated by specialty plant nurseries for its drought tolerance and native status. It is often grown for wildlife gardens, natural landscaping, and grassland habitat restoration projects.

Due to its high biomass, big bluestem is being considered as a potential feedstock for ethanol production.

== Symbols ==
Andropogon gerardii is the state grass of Illinois and Missouri and the official prairie grass of Manitoba.

== See also ==
- Schizachyrium scoparium (little bluestem)
