= Diabrotica longicornis =

Scientific classification
- Kingdom: Animalia
- Phylum: Arthropoda
- Clade: Pancrustacea
- Class: Insecta
- Order: Coleoptera
- Suborder: Polyphaga
- Infraorder: Cucujiformia
- Family: Chrysomelidae
- Genus: Diabrotica
- Species: D. longicornis

Binomial name
- Diabrotica longicornis (Say, 1824)

Species of beetle

Diabrotica longicornis is a species of skeletonizing leaf beetle in the family Chrysomelidae. It is found in Central America and North America.

== See also ==
- Diabrotica barberi, northern corn rootworm, formerly known as Diabrotica longicornis barberi
