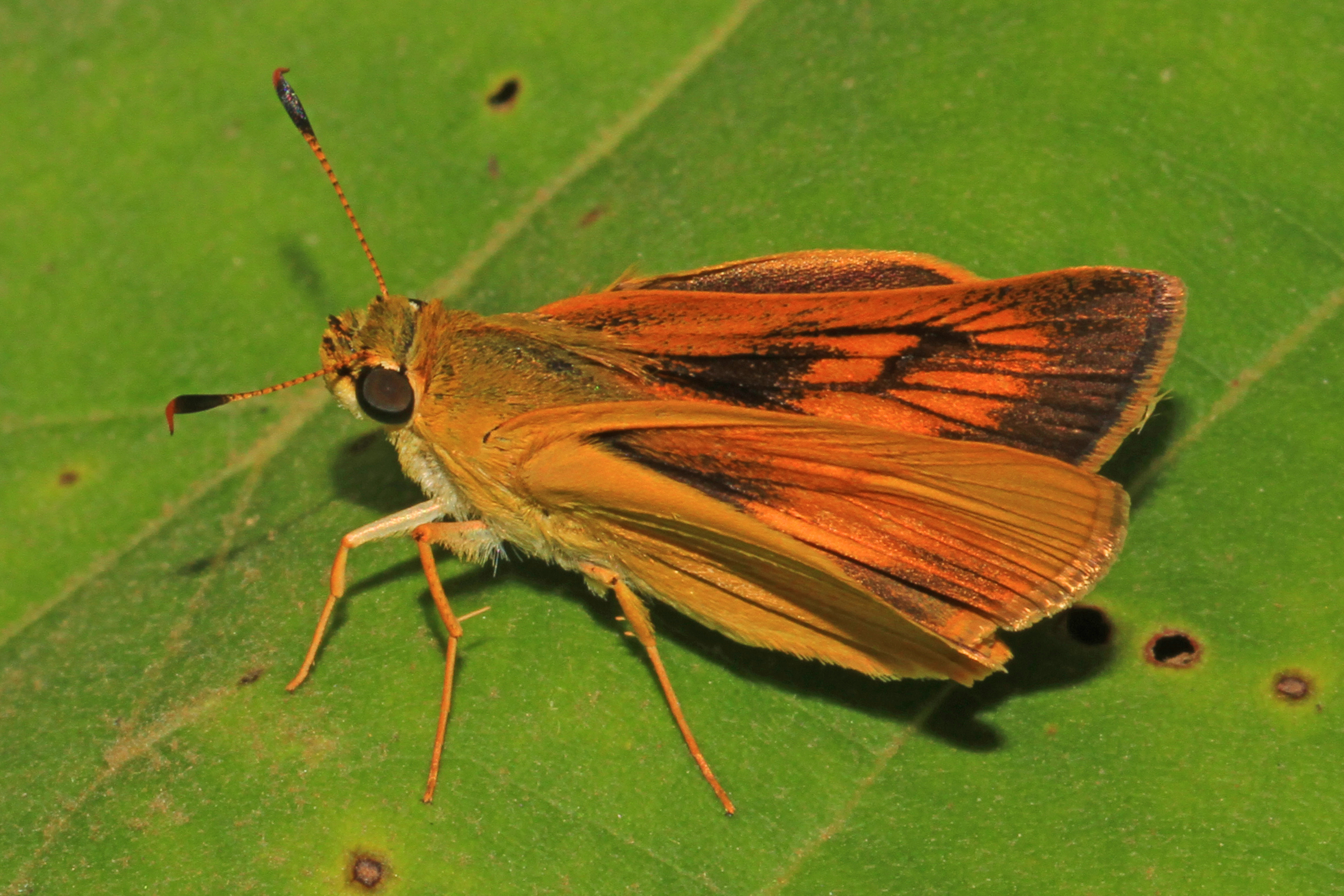

Conservation status
- Secure (NatureServe)

Scientific classification
- Domain: Eukaryota
- Kingdom: Animalia
- Phylum: Arthropoda
- Class: Insecta
- Order: Lepidoptera
- Family: Hesperiidae
- Subfamily: Hesperiinae
- Tribe: Hesperiini
- Genus: Anatrytone
- Species: A. logan

Binomial name
- Anatrytone logan (W.H. Edwards, 1863)

= Anatrytone logan =

Species of butterfly

Anatrytone logan, the Delaware skipper, is a North American butterfly. It is a member of the subfamily Hesperiinae, the grass skippers. This skipper ranges from the southern Canadian Prairies and southern Ontario through the midwestern and eastern United States.

== Description ==
Both females and males are yellow orange with black borders and dark brown veins on their wings. The borders are broader on the front and back edges of the hindwing. "The underside is yellowish orange, lacking any markings except a narrow dark border on the forewing." The wingspan is 2.5 to 4.3 centimeters.

== Biology ==
This species lives in many types of moist habitat, such as marshes and residential landscaping. It is active most of the year, producing multiple broods from February to October in warmer regions, and generally a single brood during the summer in northern areas.

Adults feed on the nectar of flowers, especially pink and white taxa such as milkweeds, mountain mints, and thistles. The caterpillars feed on grasses such as big bluestem and switchgrass.
