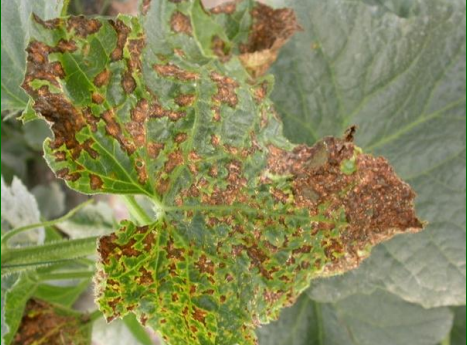
- Melon necrotic spot on older leaf

Virus classification
- (unranked): Virus
- Realm: Riboviria
- Kingdom: Orthornavirae
- Phylum: Kitrinoviricota
- Class: Tolucaviricetes
- Order: Tolivirales
- Family: Tombusviridae
- Genus: Gammacarmovirus
- Species: Melon necrotic spot virus

= Melon necrotic spot virus =

Species of virus

Melon necrotic spot virus (MNSV) is a virus that belongs to the genus Gammacarmovirus (split from formerly Carmovirus) of the family Tombusviridae. It has been observed in several countries in the Americas, Africa, Asia, and Europe. It is considered to be an endemic virus in greenhouses and field productions of Cucurbitaceae crops, including melon (Cucumis melo), cucumber (Cucumis sativus), and watermelon (Citrullus lanatus). MNSV is mainly spread through infected soil, seedlings, insects, and by the root-inhabiting fungus vector Olpidium bornovanus Symptoms vary between Curbitaceae crops, but generally consist of chlorosis, brown necrotic lesions, leaf wilt, fruit decay, and plant death. Management of the disease consists of preventing infection by rotating fields and crops, steam sterilization, and disposal of infected plants. Also, treated seeds with heat or chemicals are efficient in preventing infection. MNSV is important in melon plants as it causes vast economical damage worldwide reducing significant yields.

== Hosts and symptoms ==
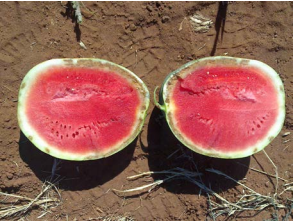
Discoloration in the rind of a seedless watermelon caused by MNSV

Melons are one of the most important crops in the tropical and temperate areas of the world. MNSV has been found to have a very narrow host range, restricted to members of the family Cucurbitaceae. In particular, the hosts include watermelons (Citrullus lanatus), cucumbers (Cucumis sativus), and melons (Cucumis melo).

On watermelon, MNSV produces chlorotic lesions on leaves, stems, and/or cotyledons, which turn into dark brown local lesions. These brown local lesions indicate necrosis occurring on the specific plant parts. Also, the fruit itself may become infected. The fruit may become misshaped with the melon flesh becoming discolored and brown ring rot becoming evident. The fruit can decay while on the plant in severe cases.

In cucumbers, MNSV produces chlorotic lesions on leaves and cotyledons. In the chlorotic lesions, necrotic brown pinpoint lesions enlarge throughout the lesions, causing the leaf and/or cotyledons to wilt and die. Stem necrosis is generally absent. The cucumber fruit itself will not display lesions.

In melons, such as rockmelon, muskmelon, and cantaloupe, MNSV produces necrotic lesions on the leaves and/or cotyledons. The roots will also exhibit necrotic lesions. The melon fruit decreases in size and displays necrotic spots on the rind as well.

Overall, infection of the crop will produce small chlorotic spots on the leaves, stems, and/or cotyledons, which turn brown while enlarging in size. The necrotic lesions can cause death to the plant structure and plant as a whole. MNSV symptoms tend to be more severe at lower temperatures. Once a plant is infected with MNSV the infection persists until plant death. If no infection occurs, MNSV can survive in soil for several years.

== Disease cycle ==
MNSV is seed-borne, soil-borne, and vector-borne. It spreads via two means: the soil fungus Olpidium bornovanus, which is soil-borne and moisture dependent, and the cucumber beetles: western spotted cucumber beetle (Diabrotica undecimpunctata undecimpunctata) and banded cucumber beetle (D. balteata). Since it is a virus, it is transmitted through vectors. Vectors are organisms with which any pathogens are transmitted.

Through seed, infection occurs when the seeds are scattered in soil containing the virus-free fungus. This is known as “vector-mediated seed transmission”. MNSV which is carried on the seed is released into the soil.

The virus attaches to the external surface of the zoospores of Olipidium bornovanus using the MNSV coat protein for attachment. The fungus itself is observed in only the root tissue of the virus-infected plants. Once the fungus invades the plant roots it transmits the virus to the host plants. The processes is then repeated once seeds are created.

Lastly, cucumber beetles act as insect vectors for MNSV. They feed on flowers of the plants, if these are available, rather than feeding on leaves. This causes reductions in fruit yield. If flowers are not available, adult beetles prefer the foliage of the cucurbit crops. This is the method by which the beetles spread the virus in a persistent manner.

== Environment ==
MNSV can be found in tropical and temperate areas in the world where its host crops thrive. The first symptoms sighting of MNSV was seen in Japan. The virus has since been reported to be infecting melons in Western Europe, Eastern Europe, the Americas, Asia, and lastly, Australia. In the United States, MNSV can be mainly found in the southern states where climates are favorable. Symptoms are visible during the spring and autumn seasons due to MNSV requiring higher humidity with specific temperature ranges. The virus begins to inoculate plants with symptoms beginning to show when temperatures are under 25°C, with the most severe temperature showing when temperatures drop slightly below 20°C.

== Management ==
Management of MNSV can be achieved through multiple methods of control. Targeting Olipidium bornovanus is effective in stopping the vector from spreading the disease. Control of the Olipidium vector can be obtained via soil sterilization with steam or methyl bromide. Controlling pest insects is also effective. The active ingredient(s) in insecticides kill the beetles, reducing the spread of the virus.

Since MNSV is soil-borne, soil disinfection and prevention of mechanical transmission is important. Removing and disposing infected plants from the soil can help disinfect soil from the virus. Also, cleaning machinery between fields is essential to limit the spread of the virus. If infected soil remains on machinery and equipment, it will spread to other fields. In cases of infection rates being too high in the particular field, crop rotation is necessary.

The virus is also seed-borne. Ensuring clean seed when planting is crucial. In order to eradicate MNSV in melon seeds without hindering germination, heat treatment of 144 hours at 70°C is necessary. Also, Trisodium phosphate is an effective chemical that can be used against seeds infected with MNSV.

Lastly, breeding for resistance is the most effective method of control against MNSV. Two cultivars in melon that exhibit resistance are “Gulfstream” and the Korean accession PI 161375. Both exhibit a single recessive gene, nsv, which is reported to control the only resistance found to MNSV in melon.

== Importance ==
Although MNSV is not well known, it has produced major outbreaks leading back to the first studies of the virus in 1966 in Japan. Kishi first discovered MNSV on Cucumis melo in a greenhouse setting in that year. For the next two decades, there were minor studies in greenhouse and field studies in California and the Netherlands on the transmission of MNSV. In 1982, nurserymen at Brough, Humberside first discovered the disease on their cucumber plants. In May 1983, some plants showed chlorosis and occasional necrotic spots on leaves. By August of that year, nearly 50% of the 120,000 plants in the greenhouse were severely infected and over 60% had MNSV by October. Fortunately the fruits of these plants did not display any symptoms although there was definite reduction in crop yield.

More recently researchers have discovered a non-systemic strain of MNSV on cucurbitaceous plants in a 2008 study. This strain was isolated from a watermelon plant and showed similar characteristics to the former MNSV pathogen except for the fact that it wasn't serologically the same and did not show symptoms on six MNSV susceptible plants. For over four decades, this pathogen has proven to be important due to the agricultural community’s lack of knowledge on MNSV as well its ability to wipe out over 60% of the crop yield as discovered during the Humberside incident.
