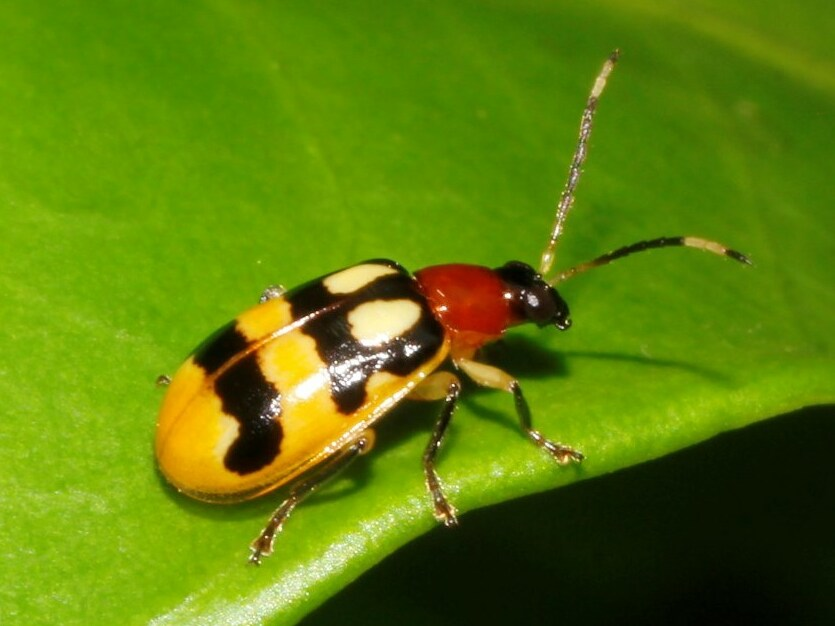

Scientific classification
- Kingdom: Animalia
- Phylum: Arthropoda
- Clade: Pancrustacea
- Class: Insecta
- Order: Coleoptera
- Suborder: Polyphaga
- Infraorder: Cucujiformia
- Family: Chrysomelidae
- Genus: Diabrotica
- Species: D. adelpha

Binomial name
- Diabrotica adelpha Harold, 1875

= Diabrotica adelpha =

Species of beetle

Diabrotica adelpha is a species of beetle in the family Chrysomelidae. It was described by Edgar von Harold in 1875.

== Description ==
The body is 5.8-7.4 mm. The body is marked with a black head, red pronotum, and distinctive pattern of black, white, and yellow on the elytra. The antennae are brownish-black with a white band on the ninth and tenth antennomeres. The legs are black with white femora.
