= Diabrotica limitata =

Scientific classification
- Kingdom: Animalia
- Phylum: Arthropoda
- Clade: Pancrustacea
- Class: Insecta
- Order: Coleoptera
- Suborder: Polyphaga
- Infraorder: Cucujiformia
- Family: Chrysomelidae
- Genus: Diabrotica
- Species: D. limitata

Binomial name
- Diabrotica limitata Sahlberg, 1823

Subspecies
- Diabrotica limitata limitata; Diabrotica limitata quindecimpuncata

Species of beetle

Diabrotica limitata is a species of leaf beetle. In 1823, it was described by Carl Reinhold Sahlberg.

In this image, the details of the underside can be seen

It has a teal thorax with an orange abdomen covered in a black polka-dot-like pattern, almost like that of a ladybug. At the very end of the abdomen is another teal section.

The subspecies Diabrotica limitata quindecimpuncata has a subspecies epithet composed of quindecim (fifteen) and punctata (punctate, spotted); literally meaning fifteen-spotted.
