= Diabrotica lemniscata =

Scientific classification
- Kingdom: Animalia
- Phylum: Arthropoda
- Clade: Pancrustacea
- Class: Insecta
- Order: Coleoptera
- Suborder: Polyphaga
- Infraorder: Cucujiformia
- Family: Chrysomelidae
- Genus: Diabrotica
- Species: D. lemniscata

Binomial name
- Diabrotica lemniscata J. L. LeConte, 1868

Species of beetle

Diabrotica lemniscata is a species of skeletonizing leaf beetle in the family Chrysomelidae. It is found in Central America and North America.
