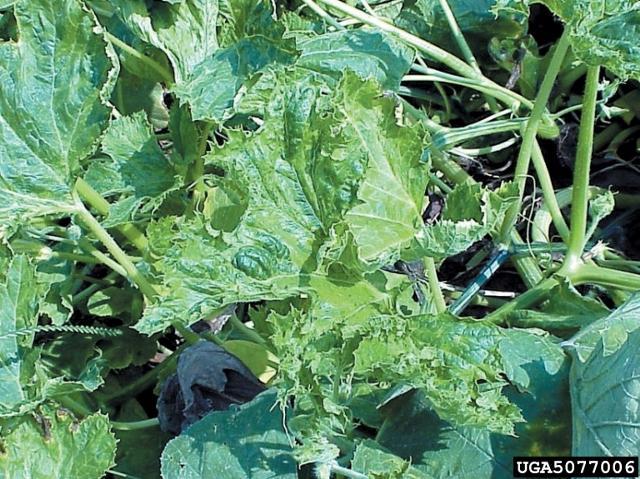
- Effect of squash mosaic virus on squash leaves

Virus classification
- (unranked): Virus
- Realm: Riboviria
- Kingdom: Orthornavirae
- Phylum: Pisuviricota
- Class: Pisoniviricetes
- Order: Picornavirales
- Family: Secoviridae
- Genus: Comovirus
- Species: Comovirus cucurbitae

= Squash mosaic virus =

Species of virus

Squash mosaic virus (SqMV) is a mosaic virus disease common in squash plants and other plants, including melons, of the family Cucurbitaceae. It occurs worldwide. It is transmitted primarily by beetles, including the leaf beetle (Acalymma trivittata), spotted cucumber beetle (Diabrotica undecimpunctata), and 28-spotted ladybird beetle (Henosepilachna vigintioctopunctata), as well as some other beetles. Plants are infected by the saliva expelled by the beetles as they feed upon the plant. The beetles acquire the virus by feeding upon an infected plant and can retain the virus in their bodies for up to 20 days. Unlike some other mosaic viruses that infect squashes, SqMV is not spread by aphids. In melons it can be spread by seeds. The results are dark green mosaic, blistering, vein clearing, yellowing of leaves, and hardening. Symptoms include "pronounced chlorotic mottle, green veinbanding, and distortion of leaves". Fruits of infected plants are also affected, becoming mottled and misshaped. There are two strains of this virus: strain 1 has a greater effect on melons than squash while the opposite is true of strain 2.

SqMV affects all cucurbits (family Cucurbitaceae) and some genera of Hydrophyllaceae, Leguminosae, and Umbelliferae, except that most isolates do not affect watermelons. SqMV and cucumber mosaic virus (CMV) are the most common viruses among cucurbits, with CMV being the more common of the two. Kendrick is credited with discovering SqMV in 1934, though McClintock may have discovered it in 1916 when he described a highly similar virus, calling it "cucumber virus".
