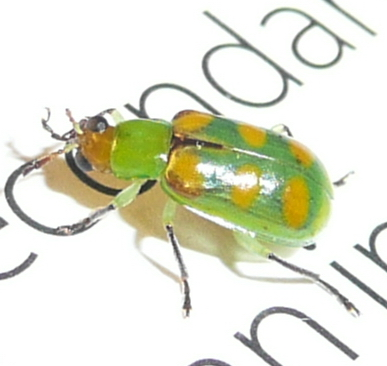
- Diabrotica speciosa beetle.
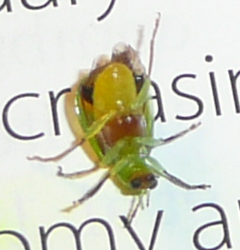
- Ventral view.

Scientific classification
- Kingdom: Animalia
- Phylum: Arthropoda
- Class: Insecta
- Order: Coleoptera
- Suborder: Polyphaga
- Infraorder: Cucujiformia
- Family: Chrysomelidae
- Subfamily: Galerucinae
- Tribe: Luperini
- Subtribe: Diabroticina
- Genus: Diabrotica
- Species: D. speciosa

Binomial name
- Diabrotica speciosa (Germar, 1824)

= Diabrotica speciosa =

Species of beetle

Diabrotica speciosa, also known as the cucurbit beetle and in Spanish as vaquita de San Antonio (this common name is also given to many ladybugs) is an insect pest native to South America. Its larvae feed on the roots of crops. The cucurbit beetle is also known to transmit several viruses such as comoviruses and different mosaic viruses. This is native to South America and is now distributed in Central America and other global areas.

Common names include the Cucurbit Beetle and San Antonio beetle. Their native land is South America in countries such as Argentina, Bolivia, Brazil, Colombia, Ecuador, French Guiana, Paraguay, Peru, Uruguay and Venezuela. Their current distribution is in Central America including countries such as Costa Rica, Mexico, and Panama. There are no known location or year of first introduction of D. speciosa to new habitats.

== Distribution ==
D. speciosa can move locally by adult flight, and by movement of eggs, larvae or pupae in soil contaminating vehicles or farm machinery. For long-distance spread, adults could be present on host plants for planting, but these are not of the kind normally moved in international trade, and the active adults will not necessarily remain on their hosts. Larvae could be associated with ground crops like groundnuts or potatoes, and the underground parts of maize, wheat or soybean because they are unlikely to be moved. It also is not likely that the larval hosts would be traded as plants with soil.

== Ecological role ==
In their native and newly acquired habitats, D. speciosa is an important pest throughout southern South America (except Chile), but, being highly polyphagous (feeds on various foods), qualitative reports of its impact on different crops vary in different regions. It is considered an important pest of maize, cucurbits, and orchard crops throughout its distribution. Although it migrates as an adult, no information on observed distances has been found.

There is evidence that D. speciosa is a viral vector for comoviruses, southern bean mosaic virus, mimosa mosaic virus, tymoviruses (such as passionfruit yellow mosaic virus), carmoviruses, and purple granadilla mosaic virus. D. speciosa transmitted cowpea severe mosaic virus (CPSMV – comovirus) to bean. Eggplant mosaic virus (EMV – tymovirus) was transmitted to tobacco by D. speciosa may also transmit bacterial wilt, caused by Erwinia tracheiphila, in cucurbits.

== Factors in establishment ==
Predators of D. speciosa are infrequent in their new habitats. This likely aids in their establishment. D. speciosa is cold-tolerant and overwinters as an adult. This positively impacts their success in colder climates. They hide in the crown or rosettes of winter-growing plants. In the spring, adults emerge to feed on the host plant. Adults like to feed on pollen-rich flowers such as cucurbits, thistle, and sunflower. Eggs are oviposited on the soil close to a host plant. Larvae complete three instars while feeding on the roots of the host plant and pupate in the soil. Multiple generations are possible. In tropical areas, the cucurbit beetle reproduces continuously.

== Control methods ==
Plant protection products are widely used to control D. speciosa, either applied to the soil to control larvae or to the above-ground parts to control adults (according to the crop concerned). Intensive use of products is required to control larvae in soil. In southern Brazil, IPM programs combine no-till agriculture, rotation of soybeans with maize or wheat, and use of insecticides only when damage is evident. Using this system, wheat is produced with virtually no pesticides in this area. Adults can be lured to baits composed of insecticide on the cucurbitacin-rich roots of wild cucurbits. Although some natural enemies of D. speciosa are known there is no prospect of biological control of this species.

== Status of mitigation ==
D. speciosa was added in 2002 to the European Plant Protection Organization (EPPO) A1 action list of pests, and endangered EPPO member countries are thus recommended to regulate it as a quarantine pest. In general, most EPPO countries prohibit the import of soil, and restrict the import of plants with soil, from other continents. This measure should be effective against D. speciosa. Host plants should be free from the pest.

== Morphology ==
=== Egg ===
During eggs stage (Ovoid, about 0.74 × 0.36 mm, clear white to pale yellow), D. speciosa becomes active in mid-spring and quickly starts locating host plants for feeding and egg deposition. Females oviposit throughout the field and eggs typically hatch within 6–9 days and can take up to 30 days with under low temperature conditions. Eggs are yellow, oval shaped laid in clusters of 25-50 below leaf surface, and measure about 0.7 mm long and 0.5 mm wide. Adult females deposit eggs in soil crevices at or near the base of cucurbit plants. Freshly laid eggs are completely dependent on soil moisture for their survival. After eggs hatch, larvae start feeding on plant roots.

=== Larvae ===
D. speciosa then transitions to larvae stage (8.5 mm long at maturity, subcylindrical; chalky white; head capsule dirty yellow-light brown) where it requires seven, five, and four days for development of first, second and third instars, respectively or a total of 2-3 ½ weeks for complete larval development. The last stage larva constructs a small chamber in the soil and pupates within that chamber.

=== Pupae stage ===
Once transitioning to pupae (5.8–7.1 mm long; white, formed in an 8 × 4 mm oval cell in the soil), a pair of stout spines is present on the tip of the abdomen and smaller spines are found on the dorsal side of other abdominal segments. Pupal period varies from 6–10 days.

=== Adult ===
D. speciosa is then finally ready to enter the adult stage (Adults are 5.5–7.3 mm long; General colour grass-green, with yellow spots). The head and legs are black, and the beaded black antennae are about 1.6 mm long. Adults are most active in the morning and late afternoon. The beetle overwinters during the adult stage near buildings, wood lots or in fence rows. Overwintering adults become active once the temperature reaches 15-20 °C. Adults are long lived: 60 days in summer and up to 200 days in winter. Adults start ovipositing 2–3 weeks after emergence.

== Diet ==
The larvae of D. speciosa feed on roots of maize, wheat, groundnut, soybean and potato, and various other crop and non-crop hosts. The adults are highly polyphagous, being recorded on over 60 species, mainly vegetables, but are particularly associated with Cucurbitaceae (e.g., Cucurbita maxima, Cucurbita pepo). They feed on every part of the plant above ground. In maize, their feeding on newly emerging silks prior to pollination is most serious, resulting in sparsely filled ears. Serial reduction in the number of ripening kernels from the tip of the ear to the base can often be observed at harvest. Whilst the adults do feed on young maize leaves, this is of secondary importance.

=== Affected plants ===
The plants affected by D. speciosa include cucumber, cantaloupe, squash, gourd, pumpkin, corn, soybean, cotton, beans, potato, grape, sweet potato, tomato, cassava, rice, sorghum, wheat, cabbage, amaranth, peanut, watermelon, bell pepper, mulberry, pea, beet, okra, onion, lettuce, and oats.

== As invasive species and viral vectors ==
D. speciosa threaten the lives of many crops and they act as vectors for many viruses, which contributes to human/animal health if consuming infected crops. They not only feasts on cucurbits but on beans, grapes, and potatoes too. The damage caused reduces the amount of food available to the plant for growth, consequently lowering the yield. They can transmit plant diseases. The most commonly-spread are bacterial wilt and the cucumber mosaic virus. D. speciosa (Germar) is one of the chrysomelid more widely distributed in crops of Argentina. They can move locally by adult flight, and probably by movement of eggs, larvae or pupae in soil contaminating vehicles or farm machinery. For long-distance spread, adults could be present on host plants for planting, but these are not of the kind normally moved in international trade, and the active adults will not necessarily remain on their hosts. Larvae could be associated with groundnuts or potatoes, but the underground parts of maize, wheat or soybean are unlikely to be moved. Nor is it likely that the larval hosts would be traded as plants with soil. Accordingly, the main potential pathway is soil as such.
