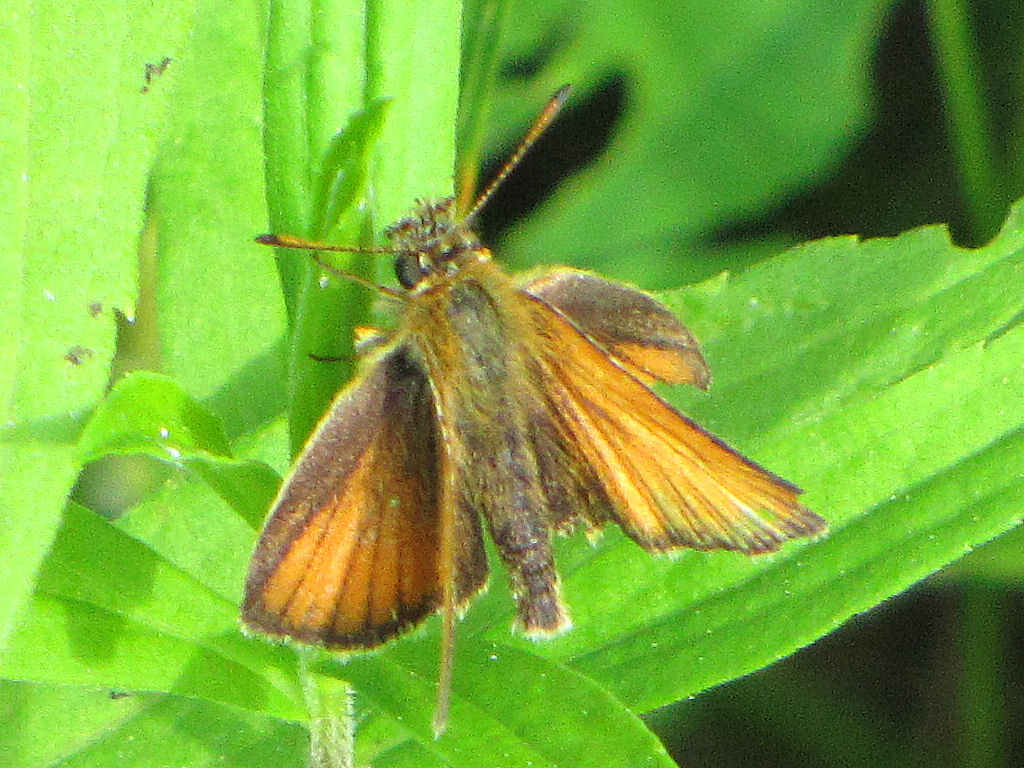
- A. logan, Delaware skipper

Scientific classification
- Kingdom: Animalia
- Phylum: Arthropoda
- Class: Insecta
- Order: Lepidoptera
- Family: Hesperiidae
- Tribe: Hesperiini
- Genus: Anatrytone; Dyar, 1905

= Anatrytone =

Genus of butterflies

Anatrytone is a genus of skipper butterflies in the family Hesperiidae widespread New World.

Anatrytone species listed in Tree of Life Web Project are:

The logan species-group:

- Anatrytone logan (Edwards, 1863) – Delaware skipper
- Anatrytone mazai (Freeman, 1969) – glowing skipper
- Anatrytone barbara (Williams & Bell, 1931)
- Anatrytone flavens (Hayward, 1940)

The mella species-group:

- Anatrytone mella (Godman, [1900]) – Mella skipper
- Anatrytone sarah Burns, 1994 – Sarah's skipper
- Anatrytone potosiensis (Freeman, 1969) – Potosi skipper
- Anatrytone perfida (Möschler, 1879) – perfida skipper
