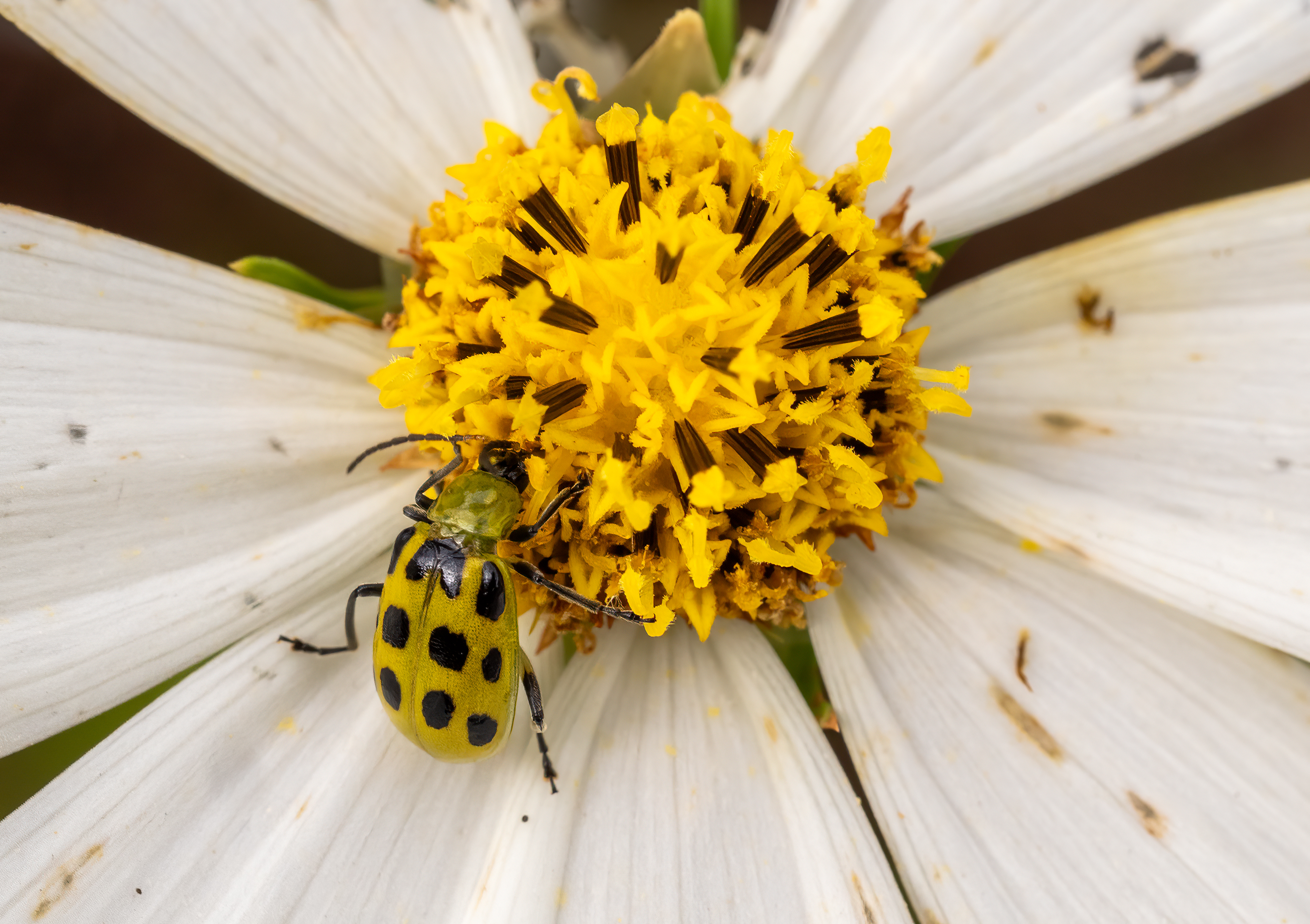

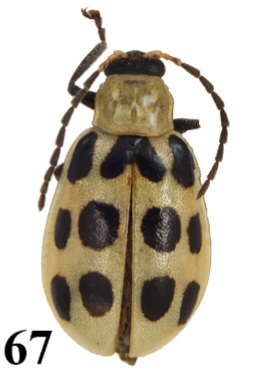

Scientific classification
- Kingdom: Animalia
- Phylum: Arthropoda
- Clade: Pancrustacea
- Class: Insecta
- Order: Coleoptera
- Suborder: Polyphaga
- Infraorder: Cucujiformia
- Family: Chrysomelidae
- Genus: Diabrotica
- Species: D. undecimpunctata

Binomial name
- Diabrotica undecimpunctata Mannerheim, 1843

= Diabrotica undecimpunctata =

Spotted cucumber beetle

Species of beetle

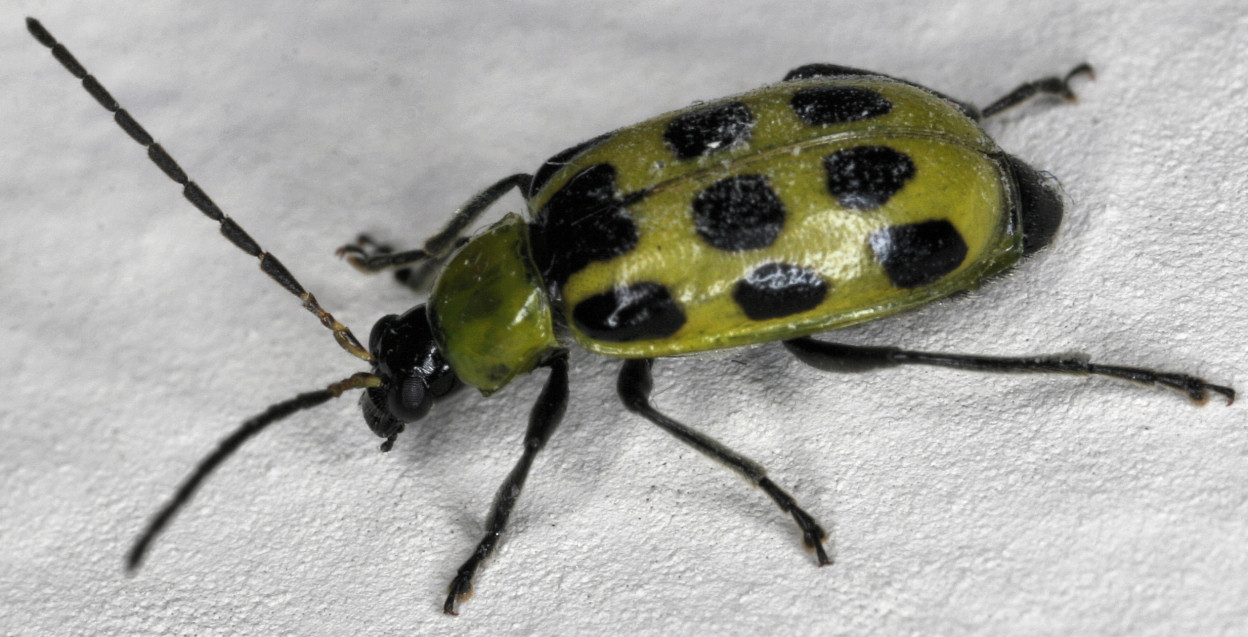
Spotted cucumber beetle

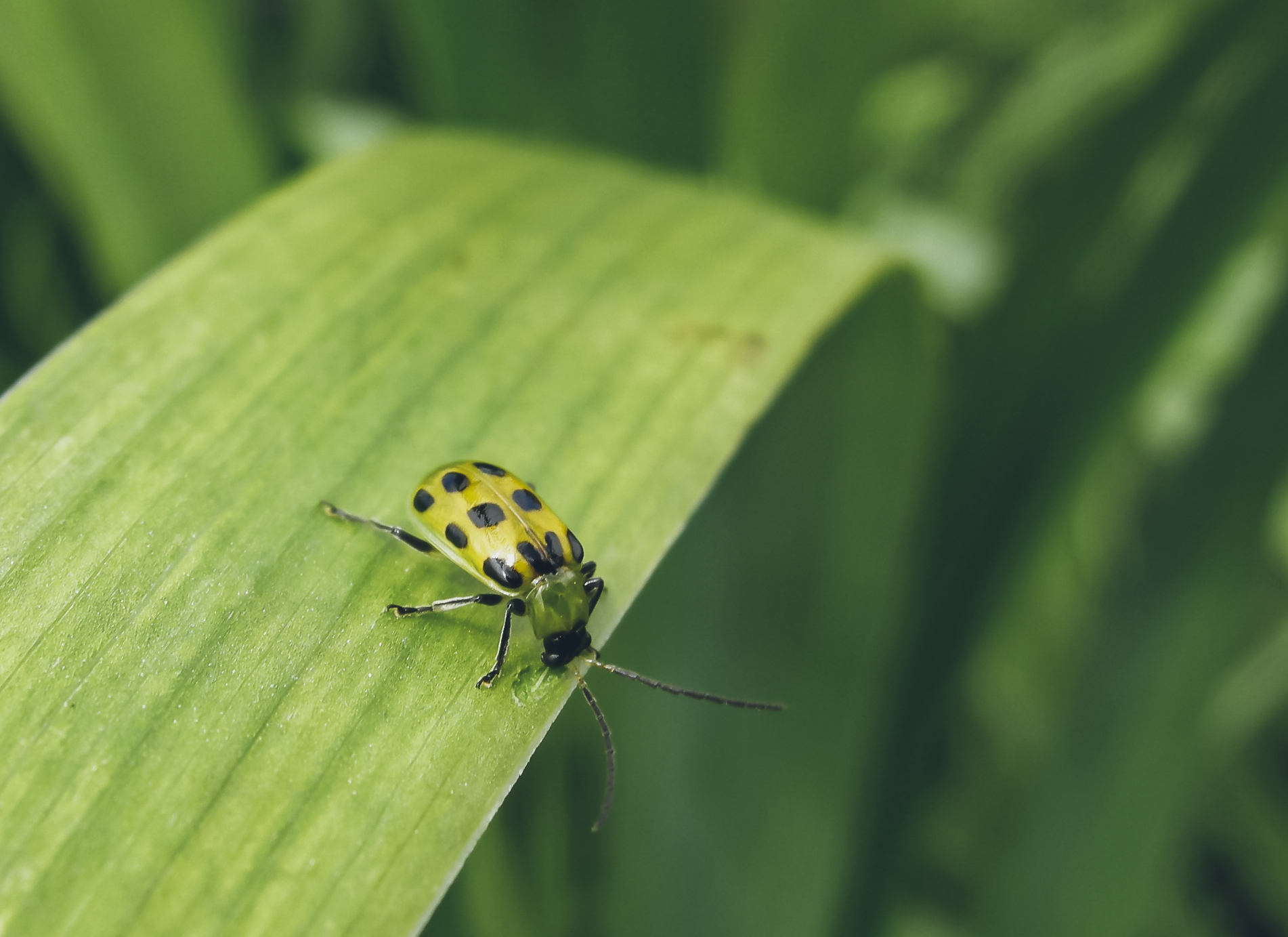
A spotted cucumber beetle eating a leaf

Diabrotica undecimpunctata on goldenrod

Diabrotica undecimpunctata, the spotted cucumber beetle or southern corn rootworm, is a species of cucumber beetle that is native to North America. The species can be a major agricultural pest insect in North America. Spotted cucumber beetles cause damage to crops in the larval and adult stages of their life cycle. Larvae feed on the roots of the emerging plants, which causes the most damage since the young plants are more vulnerable. In the adult stage the beetles cause damage by eating the flowers, leaves, stems, and fruits of the plant. The beetles can also spread diseases such as bacterial wilt and mosaic virus.

== Description ==
The three primary types of cucumber beetles are the spotted cucumber beetle, the banded cucumber beetle (Diabrotica balteata), and the striped cucumber beetle (Acalymma vittatum). In North America, the spotted and striped cucumber beetles are the most commonly encountered varieties.

The spotted cucumber beetle has three subspecies, each with a different common name:

- Diabrotica undecimpunctata howardi – spotted cucumber beetle or southern corn rootworm
- Diabrotica undecimpunctata tenella – western cucumber beetle
- Diabrotica undecimpunctata undecimpunctata – western spotted cucumber beetle

In the adult form, it eats leaves of many crops, including squash, cucumbers, soybeans, cotton, beans, and corn. Adult beetles lay eggs in the soil near a cucurbit plant. In a lifetime, females can lay between 150 and 400 eggs. However, there have been cases in which females have surpassed this quota, with some laying a total of 1,200 eggs. The eggs hatch around mid-spring and take 6–9 days to hatch under favorable conditions. In some cases, specifically when the climate is at a lower temperature, eggs can take 30 days to hatch. The ideal soil for egg survival is moist. The larval stage lasts around 2–3 weeks and the larvae are yellowish and wormlike. After the larval stage insects become pupae, this stage lasts for 6–10 days. The pupae measure around 6.25 millimeters in length and 3.5 millimeters in width. They feature a pair of robust spines located at the end of their abdomen, along with smaller spines on the upper side of their other abdominal segments. After 6–10 days the adult beetle emerges. Adult beetles are greenish-yellow with six large black spots on each elytron. They are about 0.5 cm long. In the summertime, adults usually have a lifespan of 60 days, while in winter, they can survive for as long as 200 days.

== Distribution ==
This species is found throughout southern Canada, the continental United States, and the central highlands of Mexico, but is particularly widespread throughout the southern states.

== Mating ==
During mating, the male spotted cucumber beetle positions himself on top of the female. Frequently, the female will make efforts to dislodge him. If the male manages to maintain his position despite the female's attempts, he will commence a gentle stroking of the female's antennae, eyes, and prolegs using his own antennae. This behavior is commonly referred to as 'antennal stroking.'

Before accepting a reproductive partner, a female spotted cucumber beetle may mate with up to 15 males.

== Diet ==
Adult spotted cucumber beetles consume over fifty different types of crops and wild plants, including corn, peanuts, beans, apples, cherries, clovers, lettuce, potatoes, and more. Spotted cucumber beetles are classified as generalist feeders, which means they consume a wide variety of foods; however, they often prefer cucurbits (plants belonging to the gourd family).

== Predators and biological control ==
The spotted cucumber beetle faces predation from a variety of insects and animals. Carabid beetles and wolf spiders, for example, are known to prey upon the spotted cucumber beetle, and their presence in cucumber and squash fields has been associated with reduced beetle populations. Research has indicated that encouraging populations of these predators can be an effective biological control strategy. Additionally, various birds, mammals, and amphibians feed on the spotted cucumber beetle, while the beetle's eggs are targeted by spiders, ground beetles, ants, and crickets. Some sources cite that these beetles prefer the Blue Hubbard Squash more than anything else and that planting a few of these plants in a garden as a victim plant helps save the other planted varieties of cucurbitae. See at 14:33 here https://www.youtube.com/watch?v=tj0XL10JZaU
