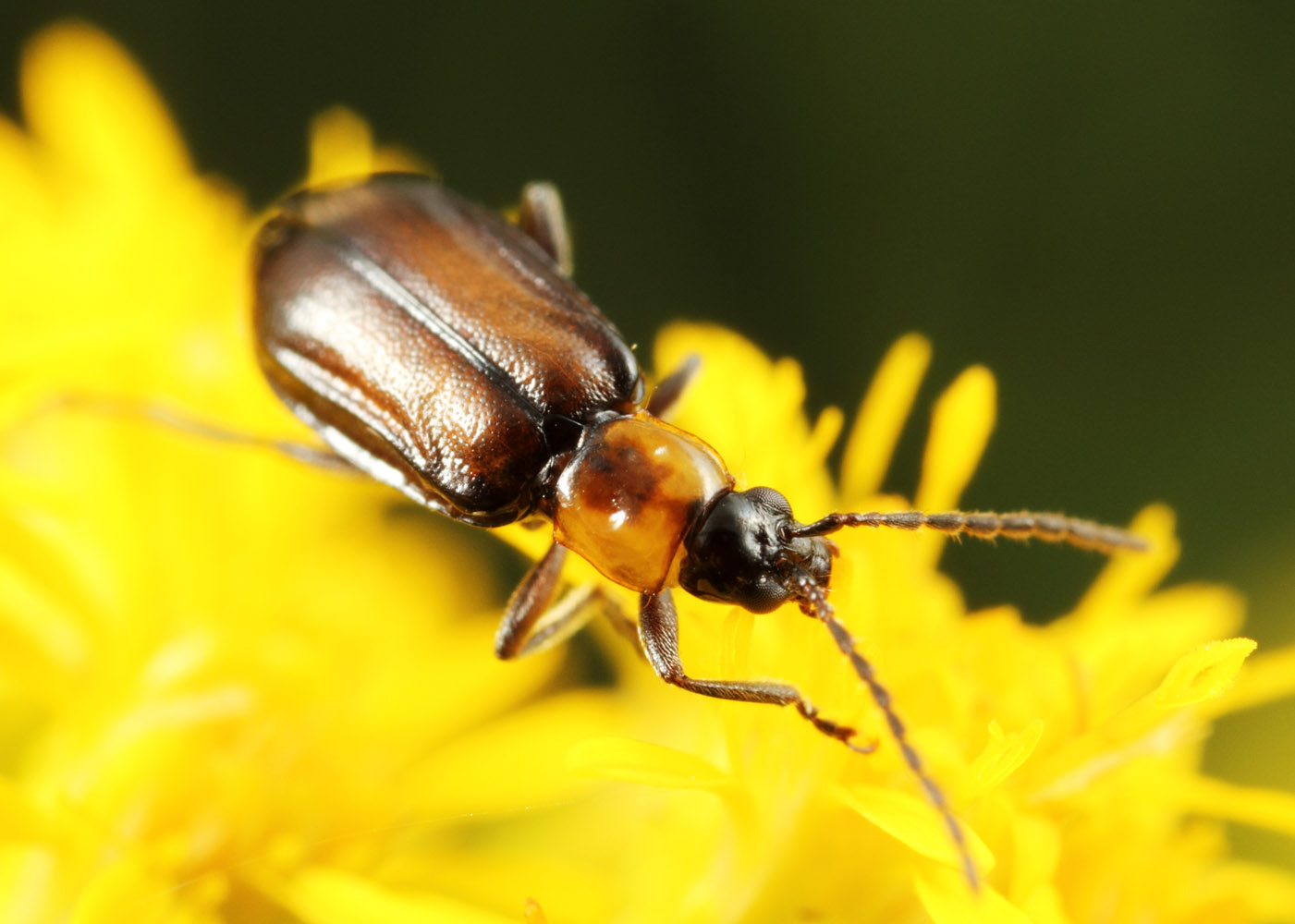
- Black Diabrotica (Diabrotica cristata)

Scientific classification
- Kingdom: Animalia
- Phylum: Arthropoda
- Clade: Pancrustacea
- Class: Insecta
- Order: Coleoptera
- Suborder: Polyphaga
- Infraorder: Cucujiformia
- Family: Chrysomelidae
- Genus: Diabrotica
- Species: D. cristata

Binomial name
- Diabrotica cristata (Harris, 1836)

= Diabrotica cristata =

Species of beetle

Diabrotica cristata, the black diabrotica, is a species of skeletonizing leaf beetle in the family Chrysomelidae. It is found in North America.
