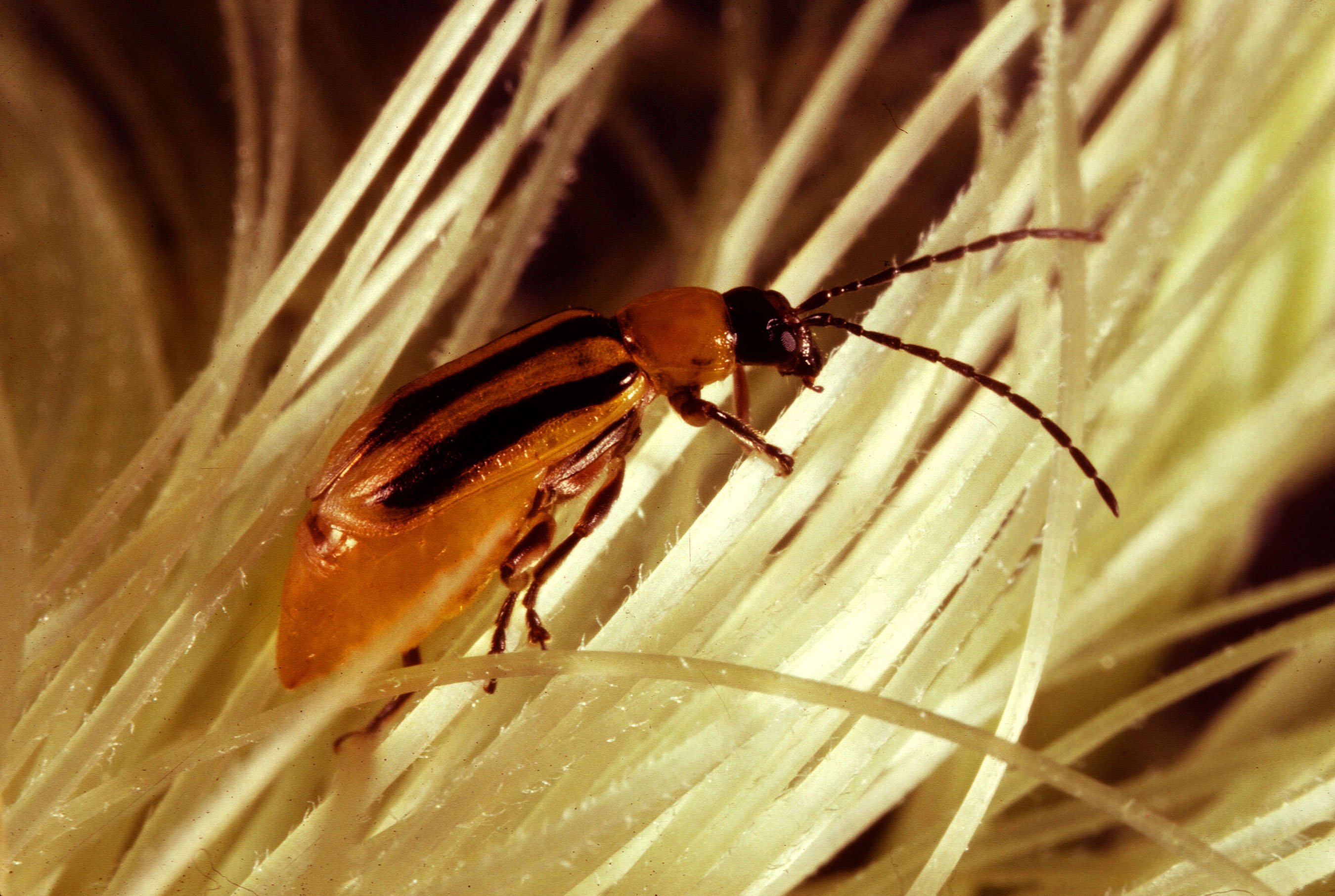

Scientific classification
- Kingdom: Animalia
- Phylum: Arthropoda
- Clade: Pancrustacea
- Class: Insecta
- Order: Coleoptera
- Suborder: Polyphaga
- Infraorder: Cucujiformia
- Family: Chrysomelidae
- Subfamily: Galerucinae
- Tribe: Luperini
- Subtribe: Diabroticina
- Genus: Diabrotica; Chevrolat in Dejean, 1836

= Diabrotica =

Genus of beetles

Diabrotica is a large, widespread genus of beetles in the family Chrysomelidae. Members of this genus include several destructive agricultural pest species, sometimes referred to as corn rootworms.

There are an estimated 400 species grouped into the genus Diabrotica. Within Diabrotica there are 3 series: fucata, virgifera, and signifera groups. The fucata series contains the majority of Diabrotica diversity with 354 species. Fucata are characterized as multivoltine, producing two broods of offspring per year. The virgifera series comprises 24 species, and the signifera series contains 11. Additionally, virgifera and signifera are characterized as univoltine, and will only brood one set of offspring annually.

There is very limited information on most species of Diabrotica. Majority of the research conducted on the Diabrotica genus focuses on investigating species of consequential economic importance, such as D. balteata, D. barberi, D. undecimpunctata howardi, D. virgifera, D. speciosa. Multiple Diabrotica species are considered major agricultural pests, therefore the control and management of populations is of significant importance to farm management strategies.

== Taxonomy and evolutionary history ==
The Diabrotica genus arose in the Cretaceous period and began to diversify and speciate ~60 million years ago, which culminated ~30-40 million years ago. Contrary to previous suggestions, Diabrotica speciation was not linked to the onset of corn and other crop cultivation. Gene sequencing has led to a phylogenetic reconstruction of the Diabrotica genus that indicates monophagy is the ancestral trait. The genus began to diversify when certain lineages expanded their diets to include a multitude of different types of plants, leading to a polyphagous trait. However, subsequent reversals back to monophagy or oligophagy have occurred in some evolutionary branches.

The diversification and evolution of Diabrotica species is closely linked to their relationship with wild plant species in the family Cucurbitaceae (cucurbits), which characteristically produce cucurbitacin secondary compounds. Cucurbitacins are bitter and toxic. While cucurbitacins deter most herbivores, Diabrotica beetles are attracted to cucurbitacins and compulsively feed on cucurbit species, especially the tissues that contain high concentrations of cucurbitacins, such as roots, seeds, and cotyledons. Diabrotica beetles favour cucurbitacin-containing plants to the extent that they will leave another nutritious plant host for a cucurbit plant. The mouthparts of Diabrotica beetles display receptors that bind cucurbitacins to stimulate this compulsive feeding behaviour. By feeding on cucurbit plants and sequestering cucurbitacin in their haemolymph, Diabrotica beetles are afforded some protective advantages, such as chemical defenses against natural predators. This is an example of pharmacophagy, in which insects consume plant metabolites for reasons besides nutrition. The aforementioned demonstrates a situation of chemically mediated coevolution between Diabrotica and cucurbit plants, and even Diabrotica species that have evolved to no longer rely on cucurbitacin-containing plants still demonstrate this compulsive feeding behavior in the presence of these plants.

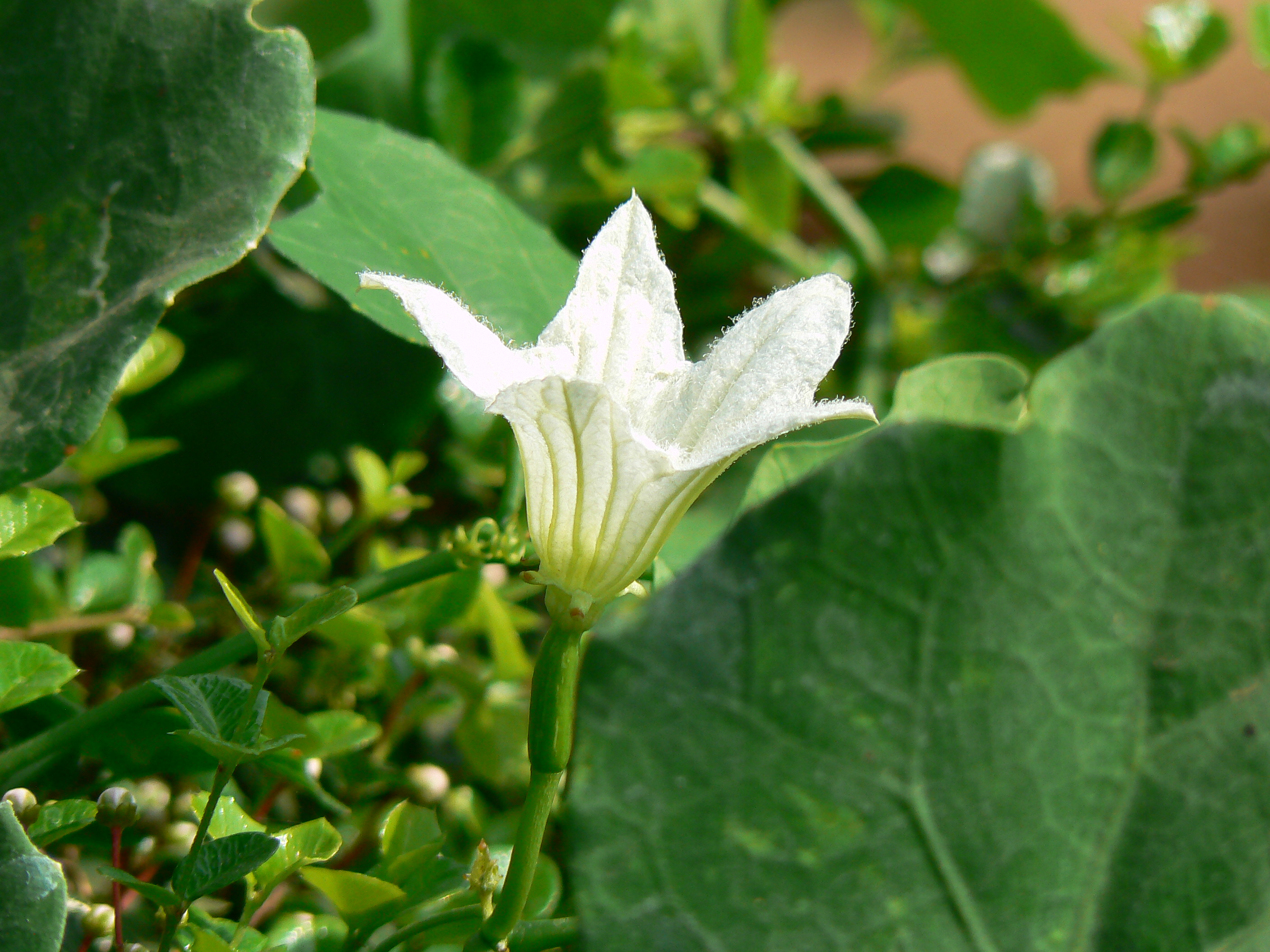
Plant in the Cucurbitaceae Family - Coccinia grandis

Diabrotica species are separated into 3 groups: virgifera, fucata, and signifera. These are ‘groups of convenience’ as they are based on host range, diet, life history, and other ecological traits, rather than being supported by molecular and genetic data.

== Distribution and historical changes ==
Diabrotica is a neotropical genus that evolutionarily originated in Central America and is native to North and South America. Central America is the most rich in Diabrotica species (i.e. has the highest number of Diabrotica species), but Mexico and Brazil are also high in Diabrotica diversity. Although the tropical areas are significantly more diverse in Diabrotica species, the US Diabrotica fauna has a greater proportion of pest species. 4 out of the 7 Diabrotica species native to the US are pests. However, only 6 out of the 338 Diabrotica species found in the tropical regions are pests.

Climate is the main factor that puts constraints on the distribution of different groups of Diabrotica species. For example, the entire fucata group is incapable of overwintering. Consequently, members of the fucata group inhabit host plants primarily located in the tropics and subtropics. However, variations in weather conditions from year to year lead to annual fluctuations in the geographic ranges of fucata group species. D. speciosa sensu lato, regarded as the best known pest species within the fucata group in South America, has a broad distribution covering the majority of the continent. Signifera group species are exclusively found within South America. A multitude of species in the virgifera group are capable of overwintering. Specifically the US virgifera group species overwinter as cold-resistant eggs.

The western corn rootworm, D. virgifera, is the most damaging pest of corn crops in the US and was accidentally brought to Serbia. As a result, its range expanded to threaten corn crops in the Eastern and Central areas of Europe, especially in Germany and Hungary. Belgium, Netherlands, and the UK were successful in extirpating in western corn rootworm. Through various strategies, such as crop rotation, Diabrotica beetles have been kept at non-damaging levels in Germany and France.

== Habitat and diet ==
Since adult Diabrotica are highly motile and have the ability to migrate, the genus occupies diverse habitats. Diabrotica movement patterns are driven by the appeal and availability of food sources. Typically, the preferred food source of adult Diabrotica includes pollen and reproductive structures of plants. Species of the fucata group are polyphagous, which means that they feed on various plant species. Species of the virgifera and signifera groups are oligophagous, which means that they consume only a few plant species.

Diabrotica species in the virgifera group that feed on corn primarily inhabit huge maize monocultures. Both D. virgifera and D. longicornis barberi are corn-feeding species within the virgifera group; however, their feeding and egg-laying behaviours exhibit some key differences. Both species feed on silks, pollen, and young kernels of corn. Adult D. virgifera also feed on corn leaves, but D. l. barberi do not. In fact, D. virgifera will remain in a corn field past the seasonal availability of pollen and silk to feed on the corn foliage, especially when their egg-laying period is prolonged. However, once silk and pollen are no longer available in a corn crop, D. l. barberi will move on and inhabit other fields of plants. As a result, high densities of D. l. barberi larvae are commonly present in crops where corn was not cultivated during the prior year. This is seldom observed for D. virgifera larvae, rather they usually remain in the corn field. Research has revealed that D. virgifera populations tend to rise when corn is continuously planted in the same field each year, but D. l barberi populations tend to benefit more from crop rotation. All together, it suggests that D. virgifera are much more dependent on corn as a habitat and food source than D. l. barberi. D. undecimpunctata howardi is a member of the fucata group that uses a broad range of plant species and does not rely on corn as long as other nutritive food sources are present.

== Lifecycle ==
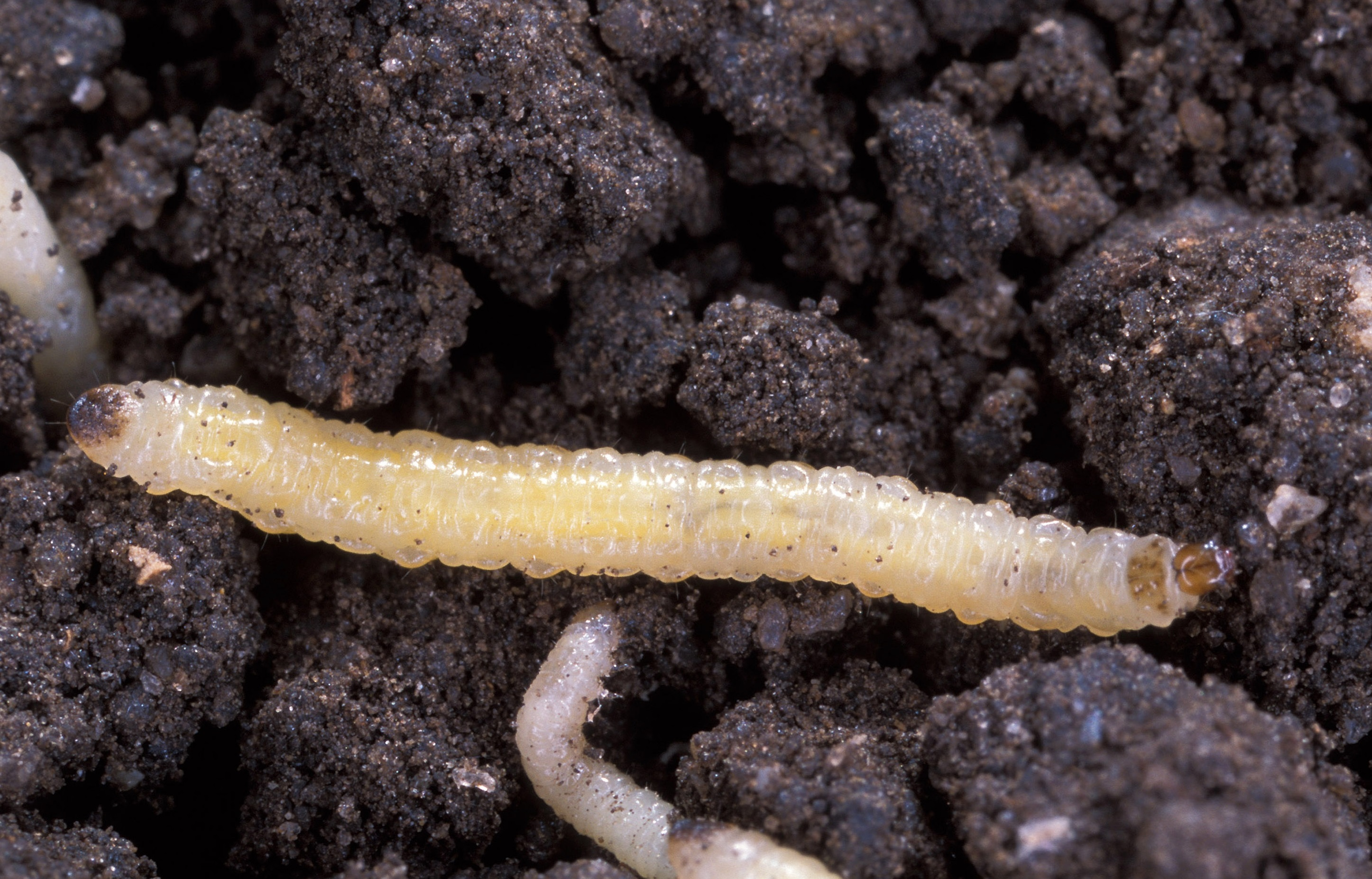
Diabrotica virgifera virgifera larvae

Adult female Diabrotica that are feeding on the leaves and pollen of the host plant release their eggs (~300-400 eggs) in the soil adjacent to the plant's roots. Eggs can be deposited as deep as 15 cm into the soil. After the eggs hatch, larval development occurs. In Diabrotica larval development, there are 3 instar larva, which are stages in Arthropod life cycles that occur between moults. Following the 3rd instar, is a mature pupa, which is the stage exhibiting complete metamorphosis to the adult form. As larvae develop, they feed on and thus damage the roots of the host plant.

For multivoltine species (2 or more broods of offspring each year), the whole lifecycle (egg to adult) lasts around 30 days. In addition, these species usually spend the winter as dormant adults suspended in their development (diapausing adults). In contrast, eggs overwinter in univoltine species. The virgifera group species are univoltine and fucata group species are multivoltine.

The corn rootworms, which include D. virgifera virgifera, D. virgifera zaea, and D. longicornis barberi, are the 3 most economically relevant taxa due to their damage on agricultural crops, especially corn. These taxa are univoltine, thus they spend the winter as eggs deposited in soil and hatch in the late spring. Adults can be seen feeding on corn silk, leaves, and pollen from the midsummer through to the frost.

== Behaviour ==
=== Foraging techniques ===
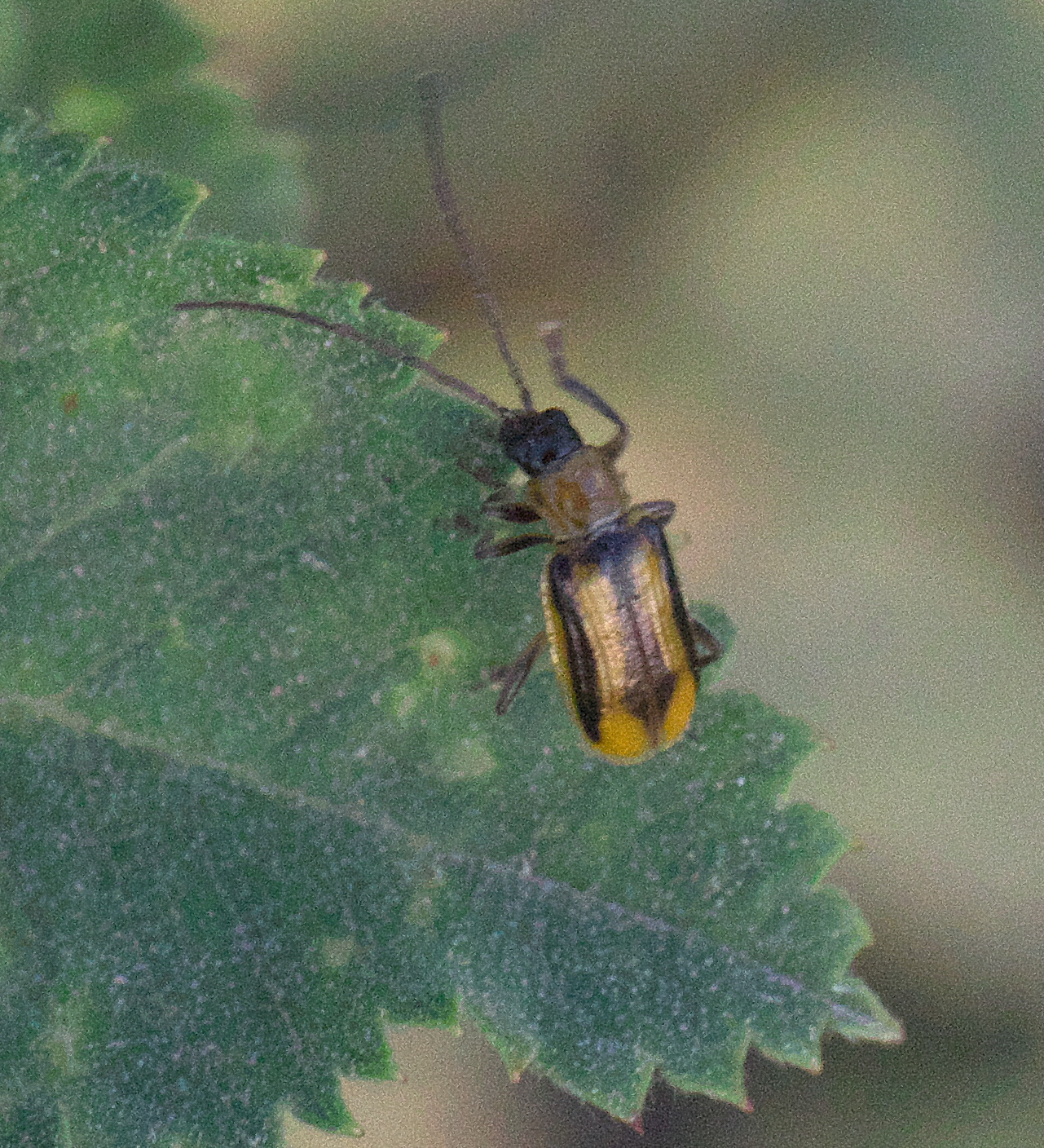
Diabrotica virgifera

Diabrotica larvae, specifically Diabrotica viridula, are prominent pests of agricultural cornfields, as the larvae's preferred food source primarily consists of corn roots. Adult females intentionally deposit the eggs of their brood in the soil of cultivated farm fields. This oviposition upon successfully hatching, allows larvae the ability to easily locate and tunnel towards the roots of the host plant. There exists a proportionality between the density of laid eggs around the targeted host plant, and the damage inflicted upon the roots of the plant. The closer eggs are laid to the host results in greater propensity for damage to incur on the host as a result of larval feeding. Other Diabrotica species larvae within the fucata series are predominantly polyphagous in nature, feeding off a variety of diverse vegetation.

Adult Diabrotica species are herbivores, with a diet predominantly consisting of foliage and pollen. Due to the vast richness of diversity in the genus a broad variety of plant species are used as host plants and food sources. Host sources of economic importance in prairie habitats include, but are not limited to, corn, squash, beans, and soybean varieties. Many Diabrotica species exhibit a preference for plants containing cucurbitacin's as they can be metabolized by the beetle into an effective chemical defense mechanism.

=== Threat responses ===
Chemical defense is a key mechanism implemented by many Diabrotica species to act as an important mode of protection against predation. Cucurbitacin is a bitter tasting compound found in certain plants that is often toxic to insects. Diabrotica species will relentlessly ingest cucurbitacin compounds synthesized by their preferential food sources. After acquiring the cucurbitacin compounds, they metabolize the consumed cucurbitacin into the haemolymph. The Diabrotica beetle will have then successfully incorporated the bitter tasting properties of cucurbitacin compounds into itself. Therefore, the adoption of the deterring bitter, toxic characteristics of the cucurbitacin's results in the Diabrotica species significantly reducing the likelihood of predation.

=== Breeding and courtship ===
Female members of Diabrotica species will release sex pheromones and begin expressing a characteristic calling posture signaling their receptivity to commence mating. The calling posture consists of exposing the membranes of the females abdominal segment's to facilitate the secretion of the aforementioned sex pheromones. Reproducing males will then approach the female and engage in tactile stimulation of the female's abdomen. This likely facilitates relaxation and increases the females receptiveness prior to and throughout the duration of copulation occurring. The mating procedure may last for 1–6 hours, with copulation lasting approximately 10–60 minutes. Mating behavior appears to be influenced by circadian rhythms, with the majority of mating events occurring around the dusk hours.

Lek formation is a behavioral pattern observed in Diabrotica species that preferentially consume cucurbitacin rich foods. During copulation, the male will transfer detoxified cucurbitacin compounds to their female mate. This transplantation of metabolized cucurbitacin's decreases the metabolic burden on brooding females to sequester energy to both brood offspring and synthesize chemical defense mechanisms against predation.

== Pest control methods ==
=== Non-chemical control ===
Due to the pestilent species of univoltine Diabrotica lifecycles being intrinsically tied to specific host plants, agronomic practices such as crop rotation, shifting sowing times, and alternative tilling techniques are viable methods to decrease the likelihood of infestation in cultivated fields. Although these techniques are effective for the management of univoltine Diabrotica species, multivoltine species remain largely unaffected by the implementation of these measures. To mitigate the damage of multivoltine Diabrotica pests, early plantation of the crops to allow ample time for maturation is moderately effective at avoiding the larval stage of Diabrotica when the crop is in its most vulnerable stage of development. This provides the crop adequate opportunity to grow and increase resilience against larval feeding attacks. However, this method is difficult to execute effectively due to variable hatch periods of overwintered eggs, and the dependence on correct seasonal timing making it susceptible to failure.

=== Chemical control ===
The most effective treatment against pestilent Diabrotica larvae stage in maize cultivation involves the application of organophosphate and phenyl pyrazole insecticides into the seed furrow during planting. For potatoes, in-furrow application of neonicotinoids is also an effective pesticide for controlling larvae. These insecticides disrupt the development of the beetle's larval stages, drastically decreasing Diabrotica population's biotic potential, ultimately contributing to effective infestation control.

=== Genetically modified organisms ===
Genetically modified crops are another method to reduce economic loss due to Diabrotica pests. High risk crops can be genetically modified to decrease susceptibility to root damage subjected by the feeding of larvae providing protection against pest-related damage.

=== Plant resistance ===
Artificial selection of chemical defenses when growing particular crops can be utilized to increase resistance to Diabrotica pests. For example, leptins can act as insecticidal agents, and glycoalkaloids confer a natural resistance to specific Diabrotica species at both the adult and larval stages in potato species. These resistance-increasing biological compounds can be selected for and subsequently increased through generations of crop plants.

=== Biological controls ===
Nematodes may be used as strategy in the management of Diabrotica larvae populations. Multiple families of nematodes will attack Diabrotica pests in the soil of cultivated fields. Steinernema carpocapsae is most commonly used for larval control in the field. This method of pest control is heavily influenced by the environmental conditions of the soil, as moisture levels and application of the nematodes may drastically affect their effectiveness. Low-tillage and reduced weed control procedures must also be implemented as agronomic strategies when using the nematodes as pest control.

The previous technique primarily targeted the larval stages of Diabrotica development. In order to target the adult demographic during infestation, an effective method involves exploiting the pestilent Diabrotica's preference for cucurbitacin containing food sources. The chemical composition of cucurbitacin's acts as a strong phagostimulant for adult Diabrotica beetles. Therefore, the beetles are attracted to the compound and inclined to ingest the material containing it. By coating cucurbitacin producing plants with an appropriate insecticide, a toxic trap can be easily created. These attractants can then be dispersed through fields to act as lures, poisoning the beetles and reducing the overall infestation.

== Species ==
- Diabrotica adelpha Harold, 1875
- Diabrotica adornata Baly, 1890
- Diabrotica aegrota Baly, 1890
- Diabrotica alboplagiata Jacoby, 1882
- Diabrotica alegrensis Bechyne & Bechyne, 1962
- Diabrotica alexia Bechyne, 1956
- Diabrotica alfazema Bechyne, 1997
- Diabrotica amecameca Krysan & Smith, 1987
- Diabrotica amoena (Dalman, 1823)
- Diabrotica amoenula Boheman, 1859
- Diabrotica analis Baly, 1890
- Diabrotica antonietta Bechyne, 1956
- Diabrotica apicalis Baly, 1886
- Diabrotica apicicornis Jacoby, 1887
- Diabrotica apicipennis (Baly, 1890)
- Diabrotica aracatuba Bechyne & Bechyne, 1964
- Diabrotica arcuata Baly, 1859
- Diabrotica asignata Baly, 1890
- Diabrotica atomaria Jacoby, 1889
- Diabrotica atriceps Baly, 1890
- Diabrotica atriineata Baly, 1889
- Diabrotica atriscutata (Baly, 1890)
- Diabrotica atromaculata Baly, 1889
- Diabrotica atrosignata (Baly, 1890)
- Diabrotica bakeri (Bowditch, 1911)
- Diabrotica barberi R. Smith & Lawrence, 1967 - northern corn rootworm
- Diabrotica barclayi Derunkov, Rocha Prado, Tishechkin & Konstantinov, 2015
- Diabrotica balteata LeConte, 1865 - banded cucumber beetle
- Diabrotica bartleti Baly, 1890
- Diabrotica beniensis Krysan & Smith, 1987
- Diabrotica biannularis Harold, 1875
- Diabrotica bilineata Baly, 1890
- Diabrotica bioculata Bowditch, 1911
- Diabrotica bipartita Jacoby, 1887
- Diabrotica bipustulata Baly, 1886
- Diabrotica bisecta Baly, 1890
- Diabrotica boggianii Bowditch, 1911
- Diabrotica boliviana Harold, 1877
- Diabrotica bordoni Bechyne & Bechyne, 1969
- Diabrotica brevicornis Baly, 1890
- Diabrotica brevilineata Jacoby, 1887
- Diabrotica brevittitata Baly, 1890
- Diabrotica brunneosignata Jacoby, 1887
- Diabrotica buckleyi Baly, 1879
- Diabrotica buqueti Baly, 1889
- Diabrotica caiuba (Bechyne & Bechyne, 1969)
- Diabrotica calchaqui Cabrera & Cabrera Walsh, 2004
- Diabrotica callangaensis Bowditch, 1911
- Diabrotica carolae Krysan & Smith, 1987
- Diabrotica caveyi Derunkov, Rocha Prado, Tishechkin & Konstantinov, 2015
- Diabrotica cavicollis Baly, 1890
- Diabrotica centralis Jacoby, 1882
- Diabrotica championi Jacoby, 1887
- Diabrotica chapuisi Baly, 1886
- Diabrotica chimborensis Bowditch, 1911
- Diabrotica chloris Baly, 1890
- Diabrotica chloropus Harold, 1875
- Diabrotica chlororhoidalis Bechyne, 1958
- Diabrotica chontalensis Jacoby, 1887
- Diabrotica circulata Harold, 1875
- Diabrotica clarkellita Bowditch, 1911
- Diabrotica clarki Weise, 1916
- Diabrotica clio Bowditch, 1911
- Diabrotica columbiensis Bowditch, 1911
- Diabrotica confluenta Baly, 1890
- Diabrotica confraterna Baly, 1889
- Diabrotica confusa Bowditch, 1911
- Diabrotica consentanea Baly, 1886
- Diabrotica contigua Baly, 1889
- Diabrotica costaricensis Derunkov, Rocha Prado, Tishechkin & Konstantinov, 2015
- Diabrotica crenulata Baly, 1890
- Diabrotica cristata (Harris, 1837)
- Diabrotica cryptochlora Bechyne, 1956
- Diabrotica cryptomorpha Bechyne, 1997
- Diabrotica curvilineata Jacoby, 1887
- Diabrotica curvipustulata Baly, 1890
- Diabrotica cyaneomaculata Jacoby, 1887
- Diabrotica decaspila Baly, 1890
- Diabrotica decempunctata Latreille, 1813
- Diabrotica deliqua Weise, 1921
- Diabrotica delrio Bowditch, 1911
- Diabrotica discoidalis Baly, 1865
- Diabrotica dissimilis Jacoby, 1887
- Diabrotica distincta Jacoby, 1882
- Diabrotica diversicornis Baly, 1890
- Diabrotica dmitryogloblini Derunkov, Rocha Prado, Tishechkin & Konstantinov, 2015
- Diabrotica duckworthorum Derunkov, Rocha Prado, Tishechkin & Konstantinov, 2015
- Diabrotica duplicata Jacoby, 1887
- Diabrotica duvivieri Baly, 1886
- Diabrotica dysoni Baly, 1886
- Diabrotica egleri (Bechyne & Bechyne, 1961)
- Diabrotica elata Fabricius, 1801
- Diabrotica elegantula Baly, 1886
- Diabrotica emorsitans Baly, 1890
- Diabrotica enae Marques, 1941
- Diabrotica ephemera Bechyne, 1958
- Diabrotica eustolia Bechyne, 1958
- Diabrotica evanescens Baly, 1889
- Diabrotica exclamationis Baly, 1859
- Diabrotica extensa (Baly, 1889)
- Diabrotica facialis Baly, 1890
- Diabrotica fallaciosa Weise, 1921
- Diabrotica fallenia Bechyne, 1956
- Diabrotica fauveli (Baly, 1890)
- Diabrotica febronia Bechyne, 1958
- Diabrotica fenestralis Jacoby, 1879
- Diabrotica fidelia Bechyne, 1956
- Diabrotica firmiona Bechyne, 1958
- Diabrotica flava (Olivier, 1791)
- Diabrotica flaviventris Jacoby, 1887
- Diabrotica flavofulva Baly, 1890
- Diabrotica formosa Baly, 1886
- Diabrotica fowleri Baly, 1890
- Diabrotica freudei Bechyne, 1956
- Diabrotica fucata (Fabricius, 1787)
- Diabrotica fulveola (Baly, 1890)
- Diabrotica fulvicornis Jacoby, 1887
- Diabrotica fulvofasciata Jacoby, 1889
- Diabrotica funerea Bowditch, 1911
- Diabrotica fuscula Bowditch, 1911
- Diabrotica gahani Jacoby, 1893
- Diabrotica generosa Baly, 1879
- Diabrotica germari Baly, 1890
- Diabrotica glaucina (Baly, 1889)
- Diabrotica godmani Jacoby, 1887
- Diabrotica gorhami Baly, 1890
- Diabrotica gracilenta Erichson, 1847
- Diabrotica gracilis Jacoby, 1878
- Diabrotica graminea (Baly, 1886)
- Diabrotica gratiosa Baly, 1886
- Diabrotica grayella Baly, 1886
- Diabrotica guaira Bechyne, 1958
- Diabrotica guaratiba (Marques, 1941)
- Diabrotica gudula Bechyne, 1956
- Diabrotica guttifera Baly, 1889
- Diabrotica haroldi Baly, 1886
- Diabrotica hartjei Derunkov, Rocha Prado, Tishechkin & Konstantinov, 2015
- Diabrotica hathawayi Marques, 1941
- Diabrotica helga Bechyne, 1956
- Diabrotica hilli Krysan & Smith, 1987
- Diabrotica hogei Jacoby, 1887
- Diabrotica ianthe Baly, 1890
- Diabrotica illigeri Baly, 1889
- Diabrotica impressipennis Jacoby, 1887
- Diabrotica inaequalis Baly, 1886
- Diabrotica inornata Weise, 1921
- Diabrotica interrupta (Baly, 1886)
- Diabrotica iridicollis Bechyne & Bechyne, 1965
- Diabrotica isohaeta Bechyne & Bechyne, 1969
- Diabrotica jacobiana Duvivier, 1885
- Diabrotica jacobyi Baly, 1879
- Diabrotica jamaicensis Bryant, 1924
- Diabrotica jariensis Bechyne & Bechyne, 1965
- Diabrotica javeti Baly, 1889
- Diabrotica josephbalyi Derunkov, Rocha Prado, Tishechkin & Konstantinov, 2015
- Diabrotica kirbyi Baly, 1890
- Diabrotica klugii Baly, 1886
- Diabrotica kraatzi Baly, 1890
- Diabrotica labiata Baly, 1886
- Diabrotica lacordairei (Kirsch, 1883)
- Diabrotica lamiina (Bechyne & Bechyne, 1969)
- Diabrotica latevittata (Baly, 1886)
- Diabrotica lawrencei Derunkov, Rocha Prado, Tishechkin & Konstantinov, 2015
- Diabrotica lebasii Baly, 1886
- Diabrotica lemniscata LeConte, 1868
- Diabrotica liberata Bechyne, 1958
- Diabrotica liciens (Fabricius, 1801)
- Diabrotica limitata (Sahlberg, 1823)
- Diabrotica linensis Bechyne, 1956
- Diabrotica linsleyi Krysan & Smith, 1987
- Diabrotica longicornis (Say, 1824)
- Diabrotica luciana (Blake, 1965)
- Diabrotica lucifera Erichson, 1847
- Diabrotica luederwaldti (Bowditch, 1911)
- Diabrotica lundi Smith & Lawrence, 1967
- Diabrotica luteopustulata Baly, 1890
- Diabrotica lutescens Baly, 1890
- Diabrotica macrina Bechyne, 1958
- Diabrotica manaensis (Weise, 1921)
- Diabrotica mantillerii Derunkov, Rocha Prado, Tishechkin & Konstantinov, 2015
- Diabrotica mapiriensis Bowditch, 1911
- Diabrotica marsila Bechyne, 1956
- Diabrotica martinjacobyi Derunkov, Rocha Prado, Tishechkin & Konstantinov, 2015
- Diabrotica matina Bechyne, 1958
- Diabrotica mauliki Barber, 1947
- Diabrotica mediofasciata Baly, 1890
- Diabrotica melanopa Erichson, 1847
- Diabrotica melanopyga Baly, 1889
- Diabrotica meyeri Baly, 1890
- Diabrotica milleri Krysan & Smith, 1987
- Diabrotica minuta Jacoby, 1879
- Diabrotica mitteri Derunkov, Rocha Prado, Tishechkin & Konstantinov, 2015
- Diabrotica modesta (Fabricius, 1801)
- Diabrotica morosa Jacoby, 1887
- Diabrotica moseri Weise, 1921
- Diabrotica munda (Weise, 1921)
- Diabrotica mutabilis Baly, 1886
- Diabrotica myrna Bechyne, 1956
- Diabrotica neolineata Bowditch, 1911
- Diabrotica nigritarsis (Baly, 1889)
- Diabrotica nigrocincta Baly, 1886
- Diabrotica nigrolimbata Baly, 1886
- Diabrotica nigromaculata Jacoby, 1878
- Diabrotica nigroscutata Baly, 1890
- Diabrotica nigrostriata Baly, 1890
- Diabrotica nitidicollis Baly, 1889
- Diabrotica novemguttata (Weise, 1921)
- Diabrotica novemmaculata Jacoby, 1878
- Diabrotica nummularis Harold, 1877
- Diabrotica obscura Jacoby, 1887
- Diabrotica occlusa Champion, 1920
- Diabrotica ochreata (Fabricius, 1792)
- Diabrotica octoplagiata Jacoby, 1887
- Diabrotica oculata (Baly, 1890)
- Diabrotica olivacea Jacoby, 1882
- Diabrotica olivieri Jacoby, 1887
- Diabrotica orthocosta (Bechyne & Bechyne, 1969)
- Diabrotica pachitensis Bowditch, 1911
- Diabrotica palpalis Jacoby, 1887
- Diabrotica panamensis Jacoby, 1887
- Diabrotica panchroma Bechyne, 1955
- Diabrotica paradoxa Jacoby, 1887
- Diabrotica paranaensis Marques, 1941
- Diabrotica parintinsensis (Bechyne & Bechyne, 1969)
- Diabrotica pascoei Baly, 1879
- Diabrotica paula (Bechyne & Bechyne, 1962)
- Diabrotica pauperata (Baly, 1890)
- Diabrotica peckii Bowditch, 1911
- Diabrotica periscopica Bechyne, 1958
- Diabrotica perkinsi Derunkov, Rocha Prado, Tishechkin & Konstantinov, 2015
- Diabrotica piceicornis Baly, 1889
- Diabrotica piceolimbata (Baly, 1890)
- Diabrotica piceomarginata (Baly, 1890)
- Diabrotica piceonotata Jacoby, 1887
- Diabrotica piceopicta (Baly, 1890)
- Diabrotica piceopunctata Bowditch, 1911
- Diabrotica piceosignata Baly, 1890
- Diabrotica platysoma Bechyne, 1956
- Diabrotica plaumanni Bechyne, 1954
- Diabrotica plebeja Weise, 1921
- Diabrotica poeclienta Bechyne, 1958
- Diabrotica porracea Harold, 1875
- Diabrotica praeusta (Weise, 1921)
- Diabrotica propylaea (Bechyne & Bechyne, 1969)
- Diabrotica prostigma Bechyne, 1958
- Diabrotica proximans (Baly, 1890)
- Diabrotica pulchella (Jacquelin-Val, 1856)
- Diabrotica pulchra (Sahlberg, 1823)
- Diabrotica purpurascens Bowditch, 1911
- Diabrotica pygidialis Jacoby, 1887
- Diabrotica quadricollis (Jacoby, 1887)
- Diabrotica ramona Bechyne, 1956
- Diabrotica recki Marques, 1941
- Diabrotica redfordae Derunkov, Rocha Prado, Tishechkin & Konstantinov, 2015
- Diabrotica reedi (Baly, 1890)
- Diabrotica regalis (Baly, 1859)
- Diabrotica regularis Jacoby, 1887
- Diabrotica relicta Suffrian, 1867
- Diabrotica rendalli Bowditch, 1911
- Diabrotica reysmithi Derunkov, Rocha Prado, Tishechkin & Konstantinov, 2015
- Diabrotica rogersi Jacoby, 1887
- Diabrotica rosenbergi Bowditch, 1911
- Diabrotica rufolimbata Baly, 1879
- Diabrotica rufomaculata Jacoby, 1887
- Diabrotica rufopustulata Bowditch, 1911
- Diabrotica salvadorensis Derunkov, Rocha Prado, Tishechkin & Konstantinov, 2015
- Diabrotica samouella Bechyne, 1956
- Diabrotica sancatarina Bowditch, 1911
- Diabrotica sanguinicollis Jacoby, 1879
- Diabrotica schaufussi Baly, 1890
- Diabrotica scripta Olivier, 1808
- Diabrotica scutellata Jacoby, 1887
- Diabrotica sebaldia Bechyne, 1956
- Diabrotica sedata Baly, 1890
- Diabrotica sel Derunkov, Rocha Prado, Tishechkin & Konstantinov, 2015
- Diabrotica selecta Jacoby, 1887
- Diabrotica semicirculata Jacoby, 1887
- Diabrotica semiflava Jacoby, 1887
- Diabrotica semisulcata Bowditch, 1911
- Diabrotica septemliturata Erichson, 1847
- Diabrotica septemplagiata Bowditch, 1911
- Diabrotica serrozulensis (Bechyne & Bechyne, 1962)
- Diabrotica sesquilineata Erichson, 1847
- Diabrotica sexmaculata Baly, 1879
- Diabrotica sharpii Kirsch, 1883
- Diabrotica sheba Bechyne, 1958
- Diabrotica signaticornis Chevrolat, 1844
- Diabrotica signifera Jacoby, 1887
- Diabrotica silvai Marques, 1941
- Diabrotica simulata (Baly, 1890)
- Diabrotica sinuata Olivier, 1789
- Diabrotica songoensis Bowditch, 1911
- Diabrotica spangleri Derunkov, Rocha Prado, Tishechkin & Konstantinov, 2015
- Diabrotica speciosa (Germar, 1824) - cucurbit beetle
- Diabrotica speciosissima Baly, 1879
- Diabrotica spilota Baly, 1890
- Diabrotica sublimbata (Baly, 1865)
- Diabrotica submarginata (Baly, 1890)
- Diabrotica subrugosa (Gahan, 1891)
- Diabrotica subsulcata Baly, 1865
- Diabrotica surinamensis Bowditch, 1911
- Diabrotica synoptica Bechyne, 1956
- Diabrotica tarsalis Harold, 1875
- Diabrotica teresa Bechyne, 1956
- Diabrotica terminalis Jacoby, 1879
- Diabrotica tessellata Jacoby, 1887
- Diabrotica testaceicollis (Baly, 1890)
- Diabrotica tibialis Jacoby, 1887
- Diabrotica tijuquensis Marques, 1941
- Diabrotica tortuosa Jacoby, 1887
- Diabrotica transversa Baly, 1890
- Diabrotica travassosi Marques, 1941
- Diabrotica tricolor Jacoby, 1887
- Diabrotica trifasciata Fabricius, 1801
- Diabrotica trifoveolata (Baly, 1890)
- Diabrotica trifurcata Jacoby, 1887
- Diabrotica triphonia Bechyne, 1958
- Diabrotica tropica (Weise, 1921)
- Diabrotica tumidicornis Erichson, 1847
- Diabrotica undecimpunctata Mannerheim, 1843 - spotted cucumber beetle, southern corn rootworm, western cucumber beetle, western spotted cucumber beetle
- Diabrotica underwoodi Bowditch, 1911
- Diabrotica unipunctata Jacoby, 1882
- Diabrotica univittata Jacoby, 1899
- Diabrotica utingae Marques, 1941
- Diabrotica vagrans Baly, 1889
- Diabrotica varicornis Jacoby, 1889
- Diabrotica variegata (Jacoby, 1887)
- Diabrotica venancia Bechyne, 1958
- Diabrotica venezuelensis Jacoby, 1882
- Diabrotica vilaolivae Bechyne & Bechyne, 1969
- Diabrotica virescens Baly, 1886
- Diabrotica virgifera LeConte, 1858 - Mexican corn rootworm, western corn rootworm
- Diabrotica viridana Baly, 1886
- Diabrotica viridans (Baly, 1889)
- Diabrotica viridicollis Jacoby, 1887
- Diabrotica viridifasciata Jacoby, 1887
- Diabrotica viridilimbata Baly, 1879
- Diabrotica viridimaculata Jacoby, 1878
- Diabrotica viridipustulata Baly, 1886
- Diabrotica viridula Fabricius, 1801
- Diabrotica waltersi Derunkov, Rocha Prado, Tishechkin & Konstantinov, 2015
- Diabrotica weisei Baly, 1890
- Diabrotica westwoodi (Baly, 1889)
- Diabrotica zikani Bechyne, 1968
- Diabrotica zischkai Bechyne, 1956
