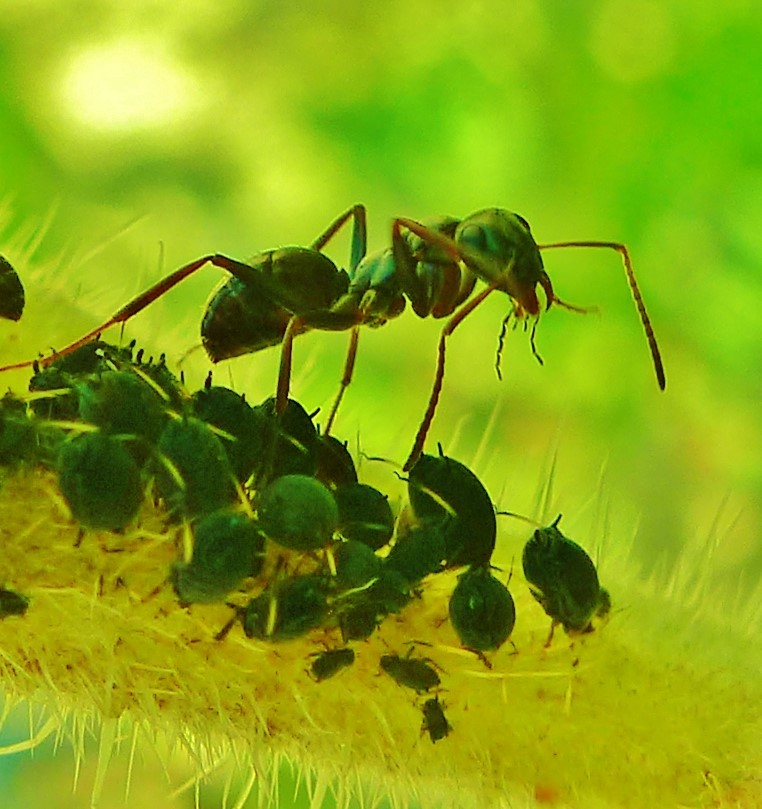

Scientific classification
- Kingdom: Animalia
- Phylum: Arthropoda
- Clade: Pancrustacea
- Class: Insecta
- Order: Hymenoptera
- Family: Formicidae
- Subfamily: Formicinae
- Genus: Formica
- Species: F. glacialis

Binomial name
- Formica glacialis Wheeler, 1908

= Formica glacialis =

Species of ant

Formica glacialis is a species of ant in the family Formicidae found mainly in Eastern Canada and New England.
