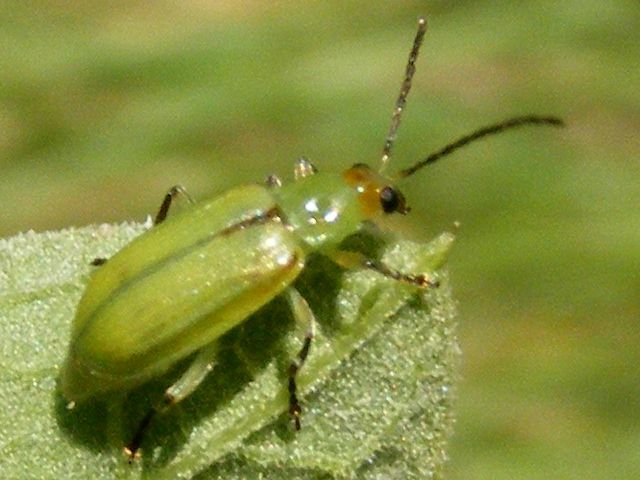

Scientific classification
- Kingdom: Animalia
- Phylum: Arthropoda
- Clade: Pancrustacea
- Class: Insecta
- Order: Coleoptera
- Suborder: Polyphaga
- Infraorder: Cucujiformia
- Family: Chrysomelidae
- Genus: Diabrotica
- Species: D. barberi

Binomial name
- Diabrotica barberi R. Smith & Lawrence, 1967

= Diabrotica barberi =

Species of beetle

Diabrotica barberi, the northern corn rootworm, is a species of skeletonizing leaf beetle in the family Chrysomelidae. It is found in North America. Adults feed on corn, and, when corn is unavailable, goldenrod pollen.
