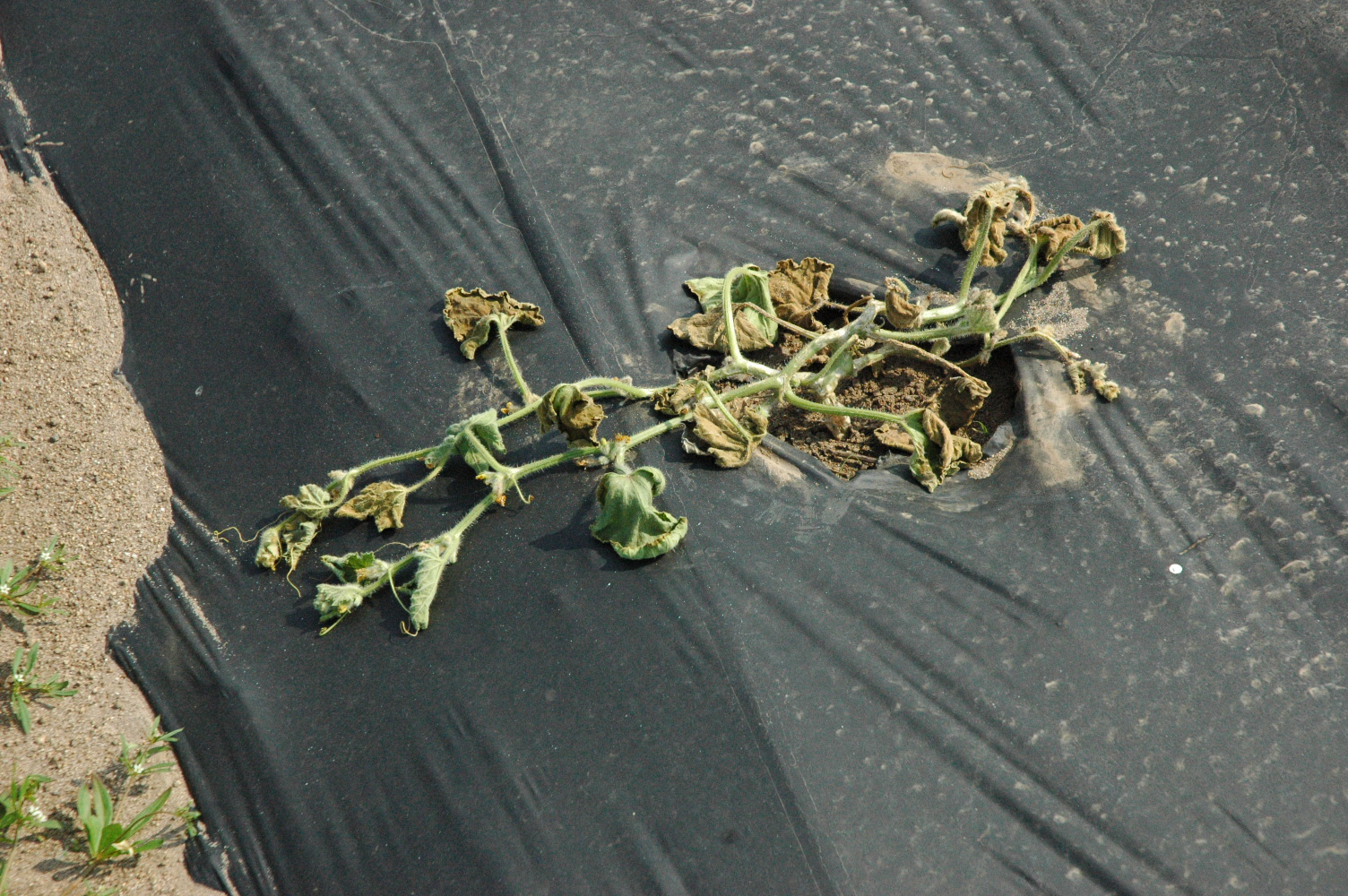

Scientific classification
- Domain: Bacteria
- Kingdom: Pseudomonadati
- Phylum: Pseudomonadota
- Class: Gammaproteobacteria
- Order: Enterobacterales
- Family: Erwiniaceae
- Genus: Erwinia
- Species: E. tracheiphila

Binomial name
- Erwinia tracheiphila (Smith 1895) Bergey et al. 1923

= Bacterial wilt =

Species of bacterium

Bacterial wilt is a complex of diseases that occur in plants such as Cucurbitaceae and Solanaceae (tomato etc.) and are caused by the pathogens Erwinia tracheiphila, a gram-negative bacterium, or Curtobacterium flaccumfaciens pv. flaccumfaciens, a gram-positive bacterium. Cucumber and melon plants are most susceptible, but squash, pumpkins, and gourds may also become infected.

Bacterial wilts of tomato, Capsicum (pepper), Solanum ovigerum (eggplant), and potato can be caused by (Burkholderiaceae) Ralstonia solanacearum. Other bacteria in the family Burkholderiaceae can cause bacterial wilt of carnation.

Bacteria in the genus Xanthomonas can cause banana bacterial wilt or bacterial wilt in the genus Agrostis.

== Disease transmission ==
Erwinia tracheiphila is spread between plants by two species of insect vectors, striped cucumber beetles (Acalymma vittatum) and spotted cucumber beetles (Diabrotica undecimpunctata). The beetles acquire E. tracheiphila by feeding on infected plants, then carry the bacteria in their digestive tracts. The disease may be spread to susceptible plants through feeding wounds, by way of infected mouthparts or frass. The bacteria is capable of overwintering in the gut of its insect vectors.

== Symptoms and diagnosis ==
Bacterial wilt is a disease of the vascular tissue. When a plant is infected, E. tracheiphila multiplies within the xylem, eventually causing mechanical blockage of the water transport system. The first sign of infection, which appears about five days after acquisition, is the wilting of individual leaves on a single stem. However, the disease will soon spread down the runner and then infect the whole plant, causing it to shrivel and die. There is a diagnostic test for bacterial wilt that can be done in the field. The presence of the E. tracheiphila causes the sap to become a milky color and acquire a sticky consistency. If the stem is cut near the crown and the ends are slowly pulled apart, the sap should form a viscous string.

== Treatment and prevention ==
Once a plant is infected, there is no way of stopping the spread of the disease. Some cucurbit cultivars are less susceptible than others, so it is beneficial to plant these cultivars. However, since wilt-resistant plants have not yet been developed, the most effective way to prevent the disease is to keep beetle populations at a minimum. While various methods of beetle control have been tested, the most effective preventative measure is to keep beetle populations as low as possible through careful field monitoring and insecticide sprays. Cultural control can also be effective, thus this means one should apply the direct methods.

== General references ==
- "Bacterial Wilt" by APSnet
- Cucumber Beetles, Corn Rootworms, and Bacterial Wilt in Cucurbits by Cornell University Plant Disease Clinic
- Yao, C., Geoffrey, Z., Bauske, E., and Kloepper, J. 1996. Relationship Between Cucumber Beetle Density and Incidence of Bacterial Wilt of Cucurbits. Entomological Society of America 89: 510–514.
