= Rhabdopterus weisei =

Scientific classification
- Kingdom: Animalia
- Phylum: Arthropoda
- Clade: Pancrustacea
- Class: Insecta
- Order: Coleoptera
- Suborder: Polyphaga
- Infraorder: Cucujiformia
- Family: Chrysomelidae
- Genus: Rhabdopterus
- Species: R. weisei

Binomial name
- Rhabdopterus weisei (Schaeffer, 1920)

Synonyms
- Colaspis subaenea Schaeffer, 1919 (nec Jacoby, 1890); Colaspis weisei Schaeffer, 1920

Species of beetle

Rhabdopterus weisei is a species of leaf beetle. It is found in North America. It was originally described under the name Colaspis subaenea by the American entomologist Charles Frederic August Schaeffer in 1919. However, this name was already used for a species described by Martin Jacoby in 1890, so Schaeffer renamed his species to Colaspis weisei the following year. It was later moved to the genus Rhabdopterus by Herbert Spencer Barber in 1943.

The species was synonymised with Rhabdopterus praetextus by William T. Schultz in 1977, but was restored as a valid species in 2001.
