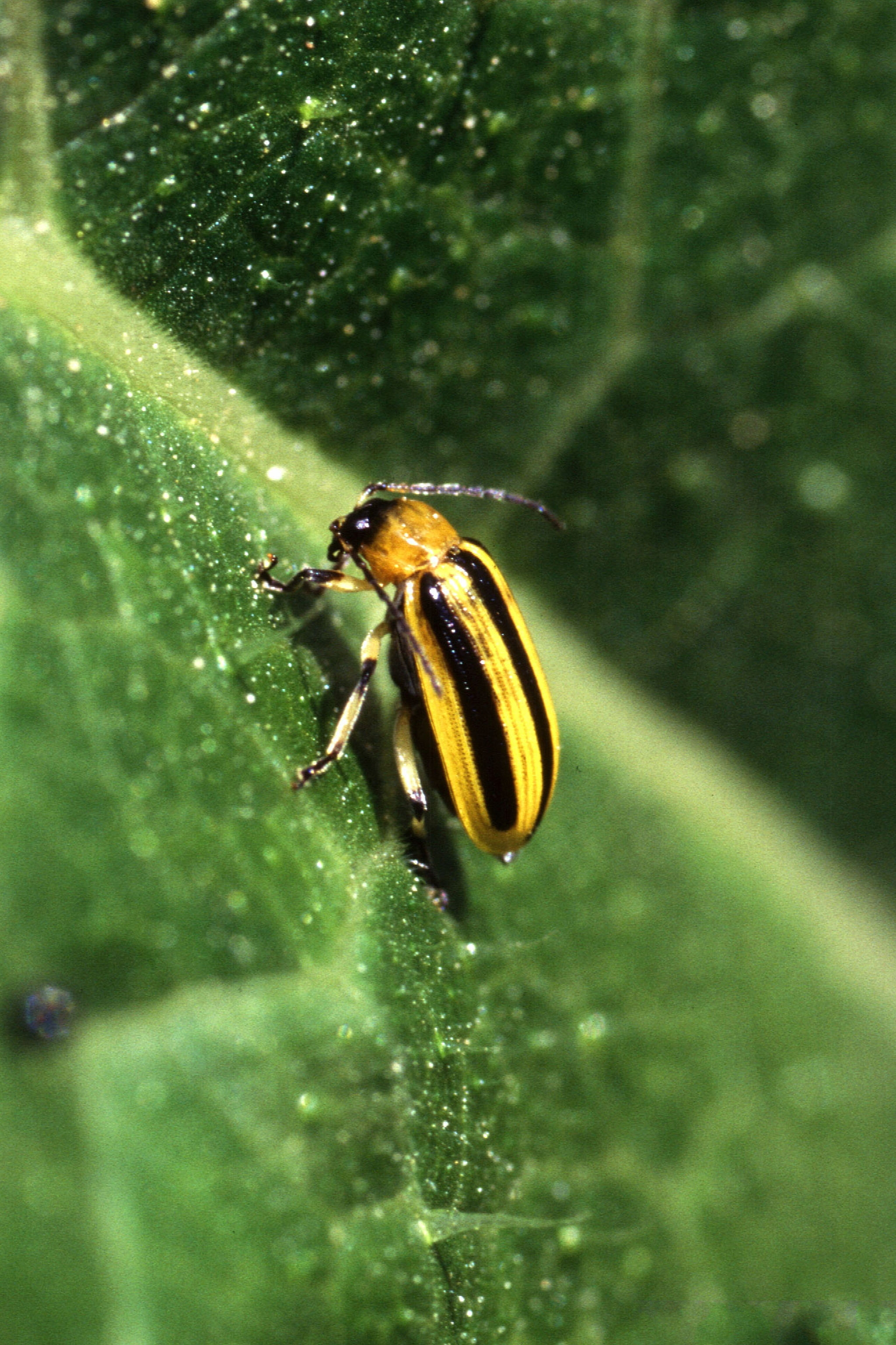

Scientific classification
- Kingdom: Animalia
- Phylum: Arthropoda
- Clade: Pancrustacea
- Class: Insecta
- Order: Coleoptera
- Suborder: Polyphaga
- Infraorder: Cucujiformia
- Family: Chrysomelidae
- Genus: Acalymma
- Species: A. vittatum

Binomial name
- Acalymma vittatum (Fabricius, 1775)

= Acalymma vittatum =

Species of beetle

Acalymma vittatum, the striped cucumber beetle, is a beetle of the family Chrysomelidae and a serious pest of cucurbit crops in both larval and adult stages. The striped cucumber beetle has a distinctive appearance, displaying a yellow-colored elytra with black stripes. It is distributed from eastern North America to the Rocky Mountains and can be found as far south as Mexico and as far North as southern Canada. In western North America, past the Rocky Mountains, the striped cucumber beetle is replaced by Acalymma trivittatum, a duller colored species often with grayish or pale white elytra rather than yellow.

The striped cucumber beetle is unique in that it is resistant to a chemical, cucurbitacin, that is found in plants and serves as a defense mechanism against herbivores. In fact, the striped cucumber beetles are drawn towards this chemical; this is an example of coevolution, where one species evolves a phenotype against a defensive phenotype of another. The reason they are called the striped cucumber beetle is because they are found commonly in cucurbit plants, like cucumbers.

Male striped cucumber beetles also release pheromones that cause aggregation of other striped cucumber beetles to the site of feeding. This creates opportunities for the males to mate with females.

Due to the striped cucumber beetle's detrimental effect on cucurbit crops, such as cucumbers and pumpkins, many management methods have been developed to curb striped beetle populations in the early spring to reduce the negative impact on farmers. Some examples include biological control agents and strategies involving bait crops.

== Description ==
Adult striped cucumber beetles have a distinctive yellow-colored elytra with black stripes. In most cases, it consists of three black stripes that span across the length of the elytra. The color of their heads is either black or brown. The color of their prothorax is yellow. Beneath the black-striped elytra is a black abdomen.

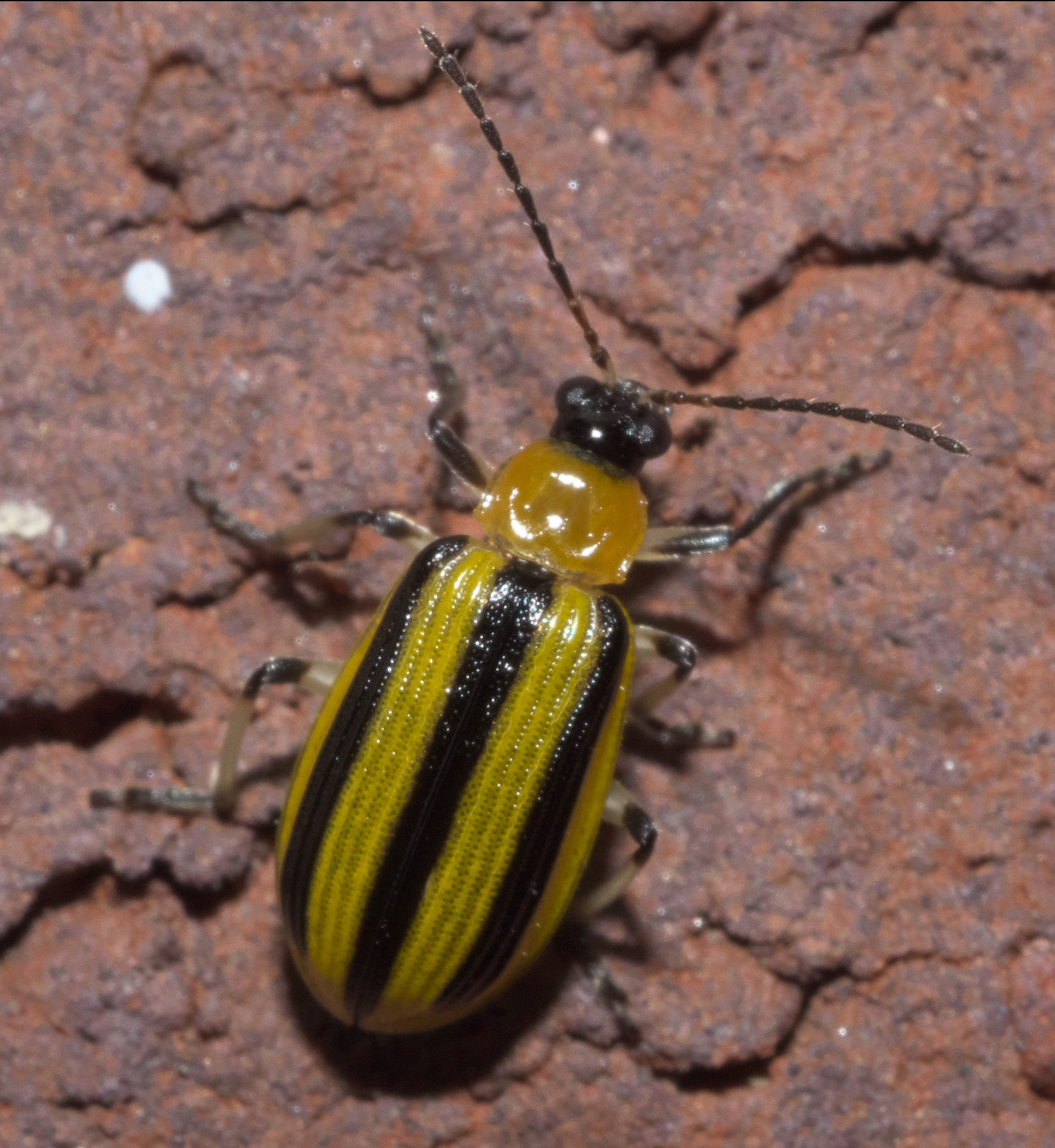
Close-up of adult Acalymma vittatum morphology

Adult striped cucumber beetles can often be confused with western corn rootworm adults. Western corn rootworm adults also have a yellow-colored elytra with three black stripes, a yellow prothorax, and a brown or black head. However, Western corn rootworm adults are longer than striped cucumber beetle adults. Whereas the length of the adult striped cucumber beetle is around 5.25 mm, the length of the western corn rootworm is around 6.3 mm. Furthermore, the black stripes of western corn rootworm adults do not fully span across the entire elytra, but begin to fade off before it reaches the tip. Thus, Adult striped cucumber beetles can be differentiated from western corn rootworms by being, on average, around 1 mm shorter than western corn rootworms and having black stripes that extend all the way to the end of their elytra.

The striped cucumber beetle pupa is around 10 mm in length. Their abdomen is white. From the center of the abdomen to the end, the width of the pupa becomes more narrow until it forms a rounded tip at the end.

== Geographic range ==
The striped cucumber beetle is native to many countries of North America. Its distribution stretches from Mexico to southern Canada and is found in large populations in the eastern United States. This species is more limited in the western stretch of North America, including the states and provinces located west of the Rocky Mountains. In this region, the Acalymma trivittatum, or the western striped cucumber beetle, is the dominant species.

== Food resources ==
=== Feeding behavior ===
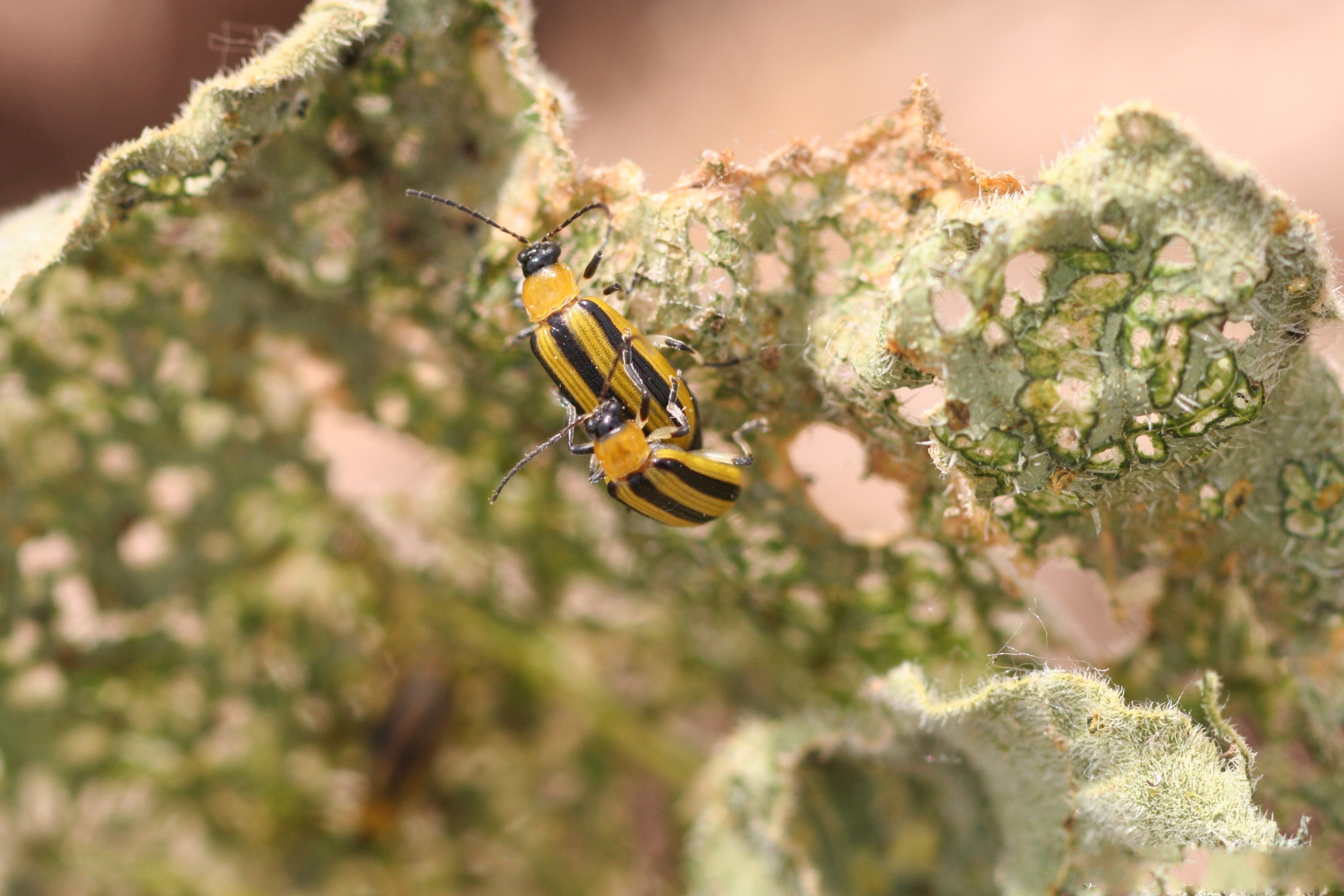
A striped cucumber beetle on a damaged crop

While feeding on these cucurbits, the adult striped cucumber beetles are drawn toward the cotyledon, which is a portion of an embryo inside the seed of a plant. Although the cotyledons have evolved to hold a chemical called cucurbitacins, a chemical that is found in plants as a design mechanism to repel herbivores, the striped cucumber beetles have evolved to favor the feeding of this chemical. This is an example of coevolution, where an evolution by plants to produce a defense chemical has been favored through striped cucumber beetle evolution. This allows the striped cucumber beetle to feed on cucurbitacin-containing seeds that other herbivores are repelled from.

Striped cucumber beetles also release a pheromone while feeding on cucurbits, which is a type of chemical insects and animals use to communicate with, to inform other striped cucumber beetles of the food source. This draws more striped cucumber beetles to the source, where aggregation can lead to mating.

In Massachusetts, it was found that the cucumber striped beetle is attracted to several other chemicals emitted by cucurbits, including 1,2,4-trimethoxybenzene and indole, though not (E)-cinnamaldehyde. In Illinois, the cucumber striped beetle was found to be attracted to indole and (E)-cinnamaldehyde, but not 1,2,4-trimethoxybenzene.

== Social behavior ==
A. vittatum exhibits aggregation behavior during feeding and mating as adult beetles tend to group together on host plants, forming dense populations during the growing season. Aggregation behavior may facilitate mate finding and increase efficiency in locating suitable food sources, contributing to the pest's reproductive success. Furthermore, A. vittatum larvae often feeding in clusters on plant tissues such as leaves and stems. This gregarious feeding behavior may lead to significant damage to host plants, especially in the early stages of crop growth.

== Life history ==
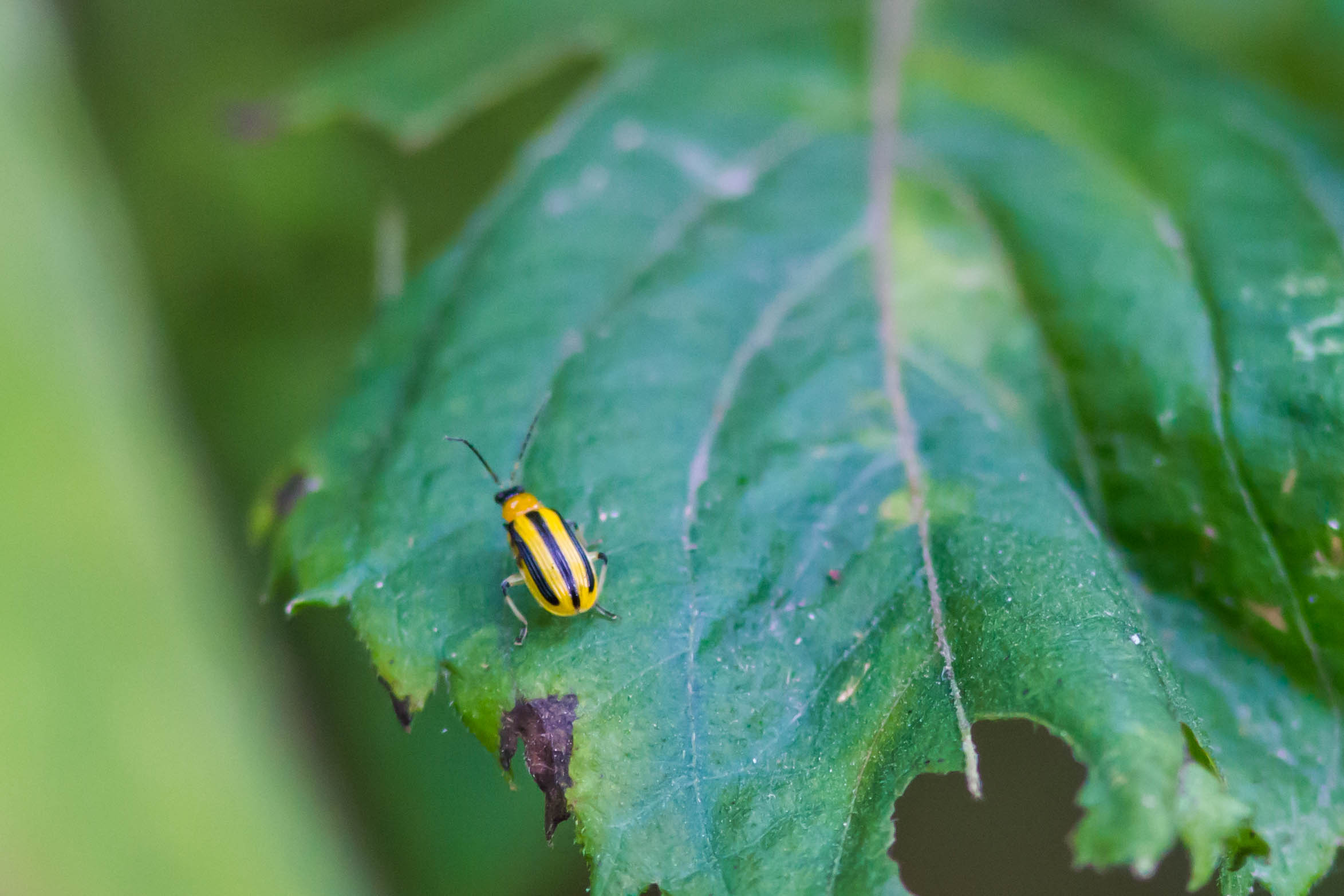
A striped cucumber beetle on a leaf

During the cold winter, adult striped cucumber beetles take shelter under small plants near fields where cucurbit crops, the preferred host plant of striped cucumber beetles, will grow in the spring. When soil temperatures rise above 13 °C (55 °F), the adult striped cucumber beetles begin feeding on the leaves and pollen of plants that begin growing earlier than cucurbits. These include aster flowers and willow trees. Once cucurbit plants begin growing, the adults begin moving away from the initial plants to the cucurbits and begin aggregating on the crop. One motive for this behavior is to find a potential mate.

After the adult beetles mate, the females will lay their eggs below the soil at the base of cucurbit plants (Eaton 2016). Females lay up to four eggs at one time. The depth at which they will deposit the eggs into the soil is around 5 cm. The distance they deposit the eggs can be up to 15 from the base of the cucurbits (Ellers 2006). Once the larvae develop, they will burrow down to feed on the roots of the cucurbit plant and then move back up to the surface as adults.

== Enemies ==
Acalymma vittatum faces predation pressure from a variety of natural enemies, including insectivorous birds, predatory insects, and parasitoids which significantly reduced beetle abundance. Additionally, parasitoids play a crucial role in regulating A. vittatum populations. Parasitoid wasps such as Tetrastichus giffardianus have been identified as important natural enemies of A. vittatum larvae, parasitizing and suppressing beetle populations in cucurbit fields.

== Mating ==
Male adult cucumber striped beetles that are the first to begin feeding on cucurbits, like a cucumber, release aggregation pheromone that attracts both sexes. However, females are more drawn towards this signal. It was found that in captured cucumber striped beetles that were feeding on crops, males only made up less than a quarter of the total number of trapped cucumber striped beetles. These initial males are known as pioneer males whose secreted pheromone have the ability to start a new colony. Therefore, one criterion for a male to be attractive to females is that he has to be in an area with suitable amounts of food. It was found that females were more drawn to males located on host plants rather than host plants or males alone.

== Interactions with humans and livestock ==
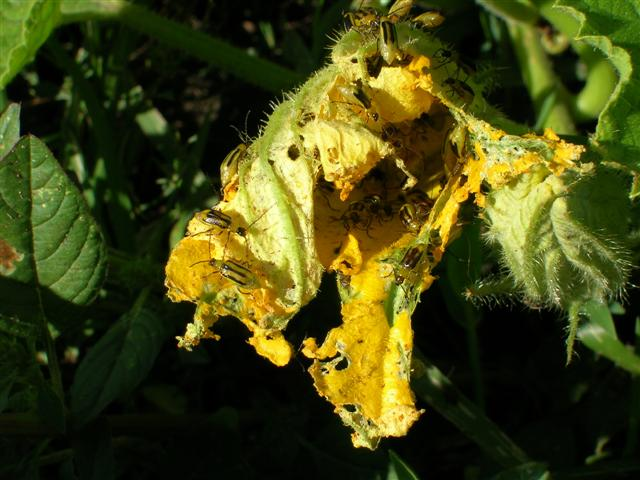
Feeding damage on a winter squash blossom

=== Pest of crop plants ===
During the spring, when adult striped cucumber beetles appear from beneath their overwintering shelter, they start feeding on many types of plants including fruits, foliage, and flowers. Feeding on flowers can cause defoliation and lower the survivability of the flowers. Feeding on fruits can cause damage such as scarring. This consequence reduces the amount of fruit farmers can harvest, which can harm farmers and cause problems for the fruit industry. The types of crops adult striped cucumber beetles feed on are many types of cucurbits. These crops are also called the gourd family. They include zucchini, squash, cucumbers, pumpkins, watermelon, butternut squash, and other types of gourds.

Brave new world: recent evolution of an insect-transmitted pathogen a seminar given by Dr. Roberto Kolter

Striped cucumber beetles can also cause damage to crops by transmitting the Erwinia tracheiphila bacteria to plants. The bacteria first infects the striped cucumber beetle when they are overwintering beneath foliage that is also infected with Erwinia tracheiphila. In the spring, once Striped cucumber beetles begin feeding, they can pass along this bacteria, which harms the plant by growing in its vascular system and blocking the flow of water and nutrients. Due to the extensive damage that can be caused by a bacterial infection, the damage caused by the transmission of Erwinia tracheiphila by the striped cucumber beetles can be much more severe than the damage caused by direct feeding.

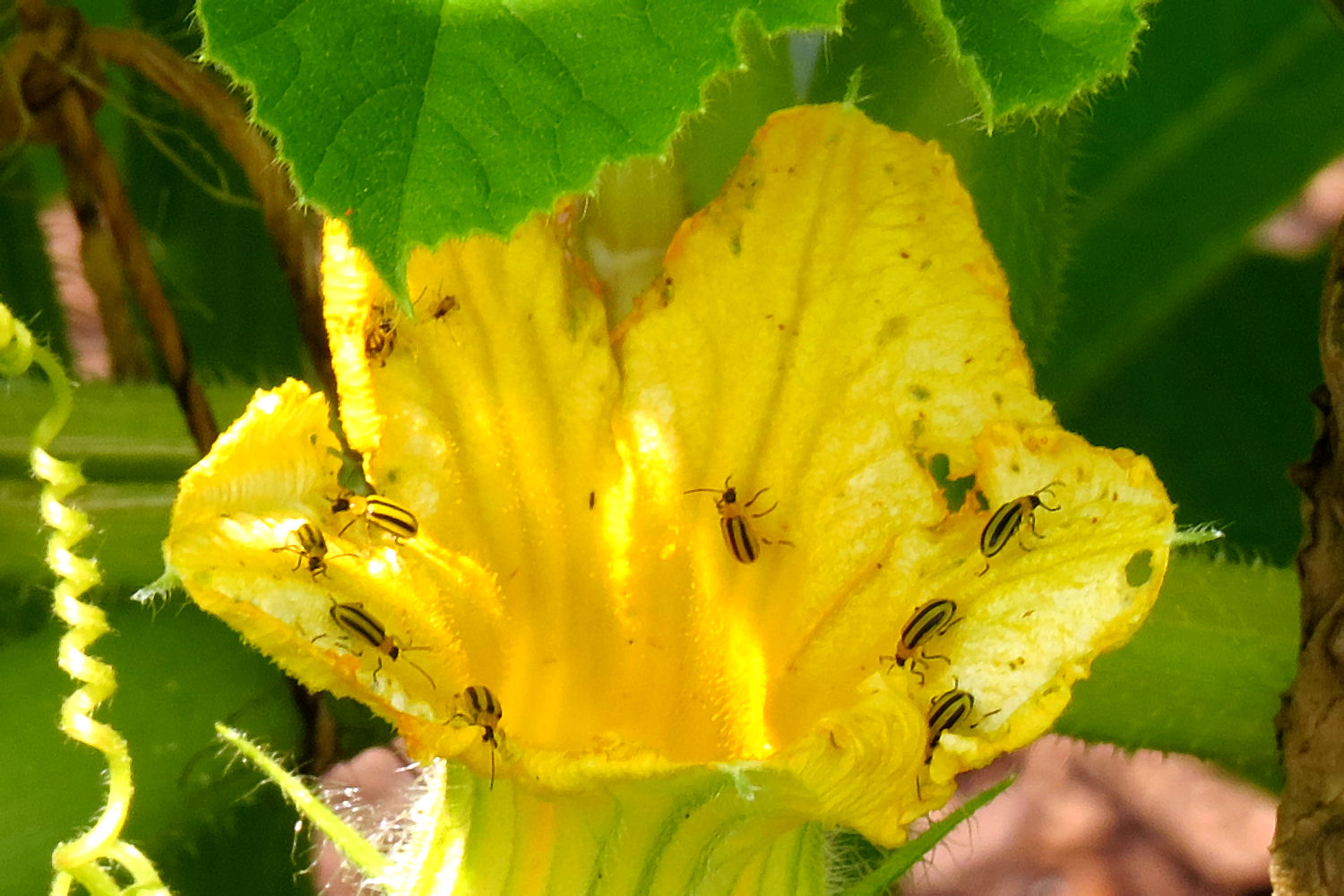
On Cucurbita sp. flower, Ottawa, Ontario, Canada

=== Monitoring ===
Since striped cucumber beetles are particularly attracted to plant seedlings, monitoring of striped cucumber beetles is important when seedlings first begin to emerge in early spring. Previous studies have shown that striped cucumber beetles are most active in feeding during the morning and early evening. Furthermore, newly emerged plants are most vulnerable to damage from striped cucumber beetles.

=== Management ===
Since striped cucumber beetle activity is highest early on in the spring season, monitoring and managing the striped cucumber beetle early on is important to reduce the negative impacts of their feeding.

There are several methods to manage the population of striped cucumber beetles. One method is the use of biological control agents. Previously, arthropods that predate on striped cucumber beetles like spiders, rove beetles, and ground beetles have been used. Other types of predators include vertebrates, such as bats, which have also been used. Additionally flies, such as the Celatoria setosaI have been used to target striped cucumber beetles. These flies are a type of parasites that target striped cucumber beetles. Studies have shown that these parasitoid flies can infect around 43–54% of a striped cucumber beetle population.

Farmers can also implement different strategies to delay or limit the onset of striped cucumber beetle feeding. Due to striped cucumber beetle's attraction towards the chemical cucurbitacin in cucurbit crops, farmers can plant cucurbits that contain lower concentrations of cucurbitacin in areas with high concentrations of striped cucumber beetles. It was found that striped cucumber beetles were less drawn toward crops with lower amounts of cucurbitacin. In addition to selecting crops with low levels of cucurbitacin, farmers can select crops that have resistance against the Erwinia tracheiphila bacteria. One example of such a crop is watermelon while cucumber is highly prone to infection.

Farmers can also plant bait crops with high amounts of cucurbitacin on the perimeter of the field to attract striped cucumber beetles away from their main produce. Striped cucumber beetle-specific insecticides can then be sprayed on the bait crop rather than using a broad-spectrum insecticide on the entire field. This is beneficial because too much usage of broad-spectrum insecticides can cause insects to build resistance easily.

Some research indicates that striped cucumber beetle damage can be reduced by the use of vermicompost fertilizer compared to inorganic fertilizer. Researchers suggest that the mechanism by which vermicompost reduces beetle damage is due to an increase in phenolic compounds in plants grown with vermicompost.
