= A. gouldi =

A. gouldi may refer to:

- Acalymma gouldi, a leaf beetle species found in North America
- Astacopsis gouldi, the Tasmanian giant freshwater crayfish, the largest freshwater invertebrate species in the world

== See also ==
- Gouldi (disambiguation)
