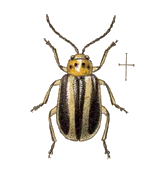
- Amphelasma decoratum

Scientific classification
- Kingdom: Animalia
- Phylum: Arthropoda
- Clade: Pancrustacea
- Class: Insecta
- Order: Coleoptera
- Suborder: Polyphaga
- Infraorder: Cucujiformia
- Family: Chrysomelidae
- Subfamily: Galerucinae
- Tribe: Luperini
- Subtribe: Diabroticina
- Genus: Amphelasma; Barber, 1947

Type species
- Galeruca cava Say, 1835

= Amphelasma =

Genus of beetles

Amphelasma is a genus of skeletonizing leaf beetles and flea beetles in the family Chrysomelidae. There are 11 described species in Amphelasma, distributed from Venezuela to Mexico, with one species (Amphelasma cavum) ranging in southern Arizona.

== Selected species ==
- Amphelasma bipuncticolle (Schaeffer, 1905)
- Amphelasma cavum (Say, 1835)
- Amphelasma decoratum (Jacoby, 1887)
- Amphelasma trilineatum (Jacoby, 1887)
- Amphelasma unilineatum (Jacoby, 1887)
