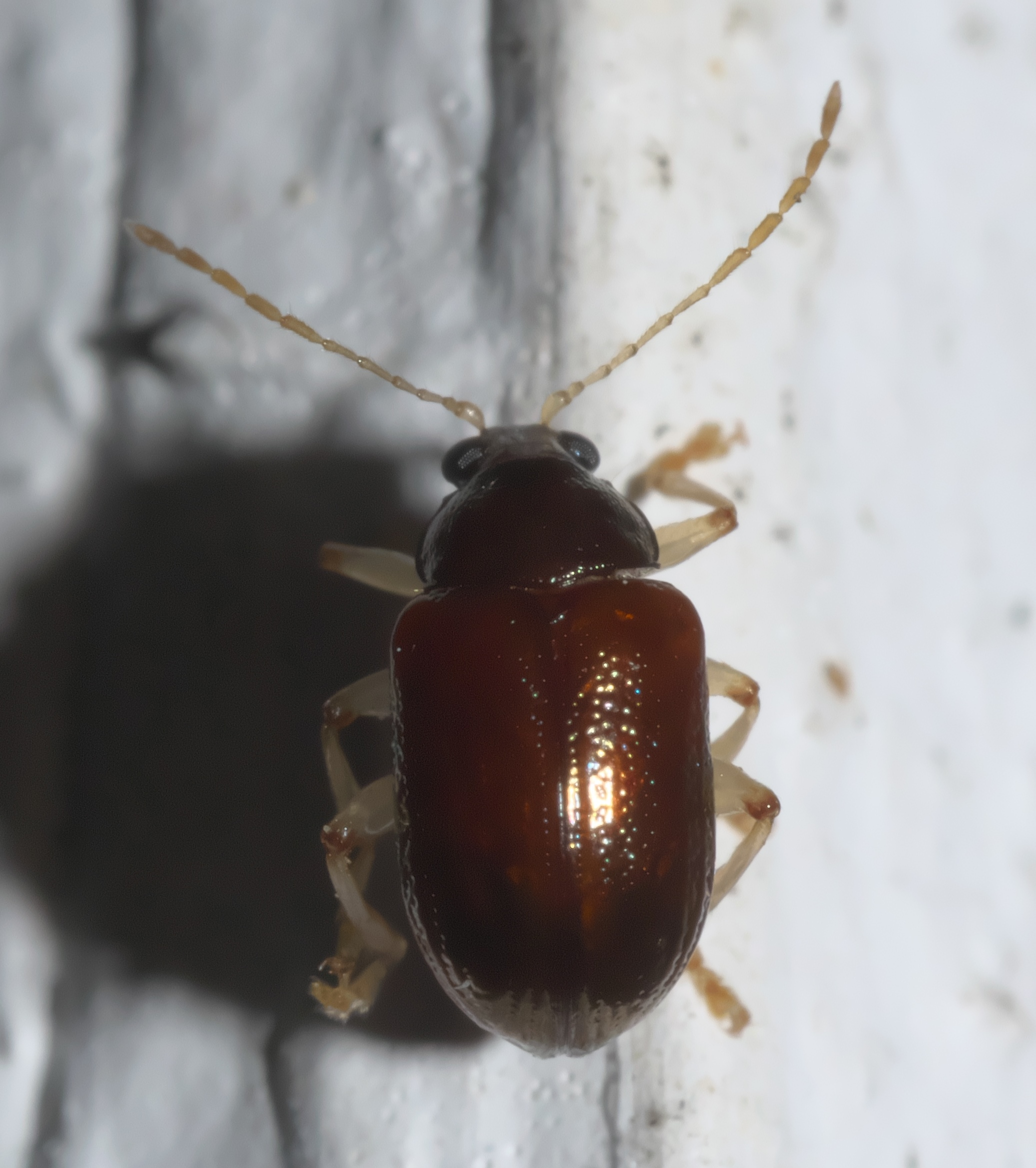

Scientific classification
- Kingdom: Animalia
- Phylum: Arthropoda
- Clade: Pancrustacea
- Class: Insecta
- Order: Coleoptera
- Suborder: Polyphaga
- Infraorder: Cucujiformia
- Family: Chrysomelidae
- Tribe: Eumolpini
- Genus: Rhabdopterus; Lefèvre, 1885

Type species
- Colaspis hypochalcea Harold, 1875

Synonyms
- Rhabdophorus Lefèvre, 1878 (nec Swainson, 1839)

= Rhabdopterus =

Genus of leaf beetles

Rhabdopterus is a genus of leaf beetles in the subfamily Eumolpinae. There are about 70 described species in Rhabdopterus from North and South America, eight of which are found north of Mexico. The Nearctic species may not be congeneric with the type species, which is South American.

== Gallery ==
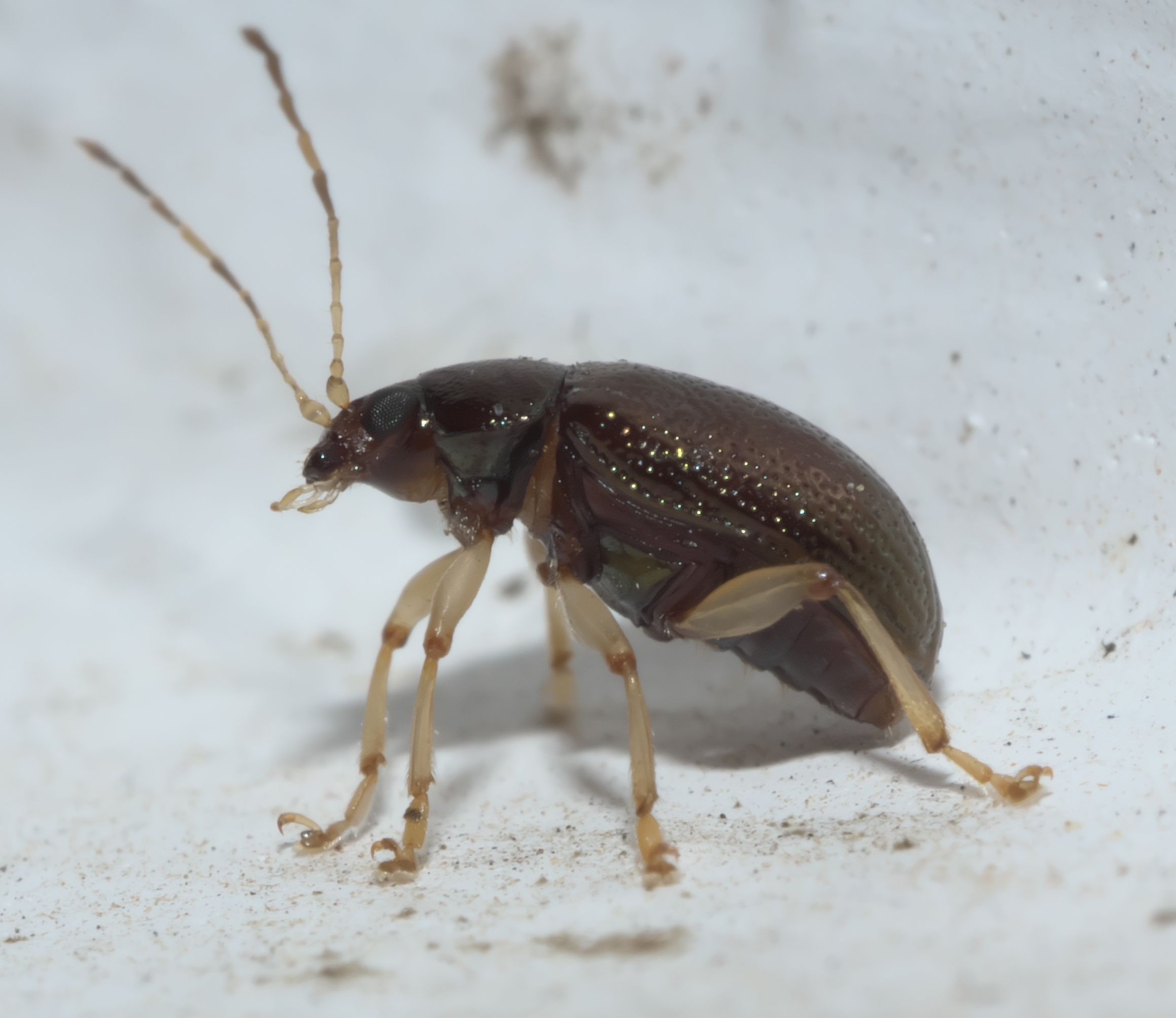

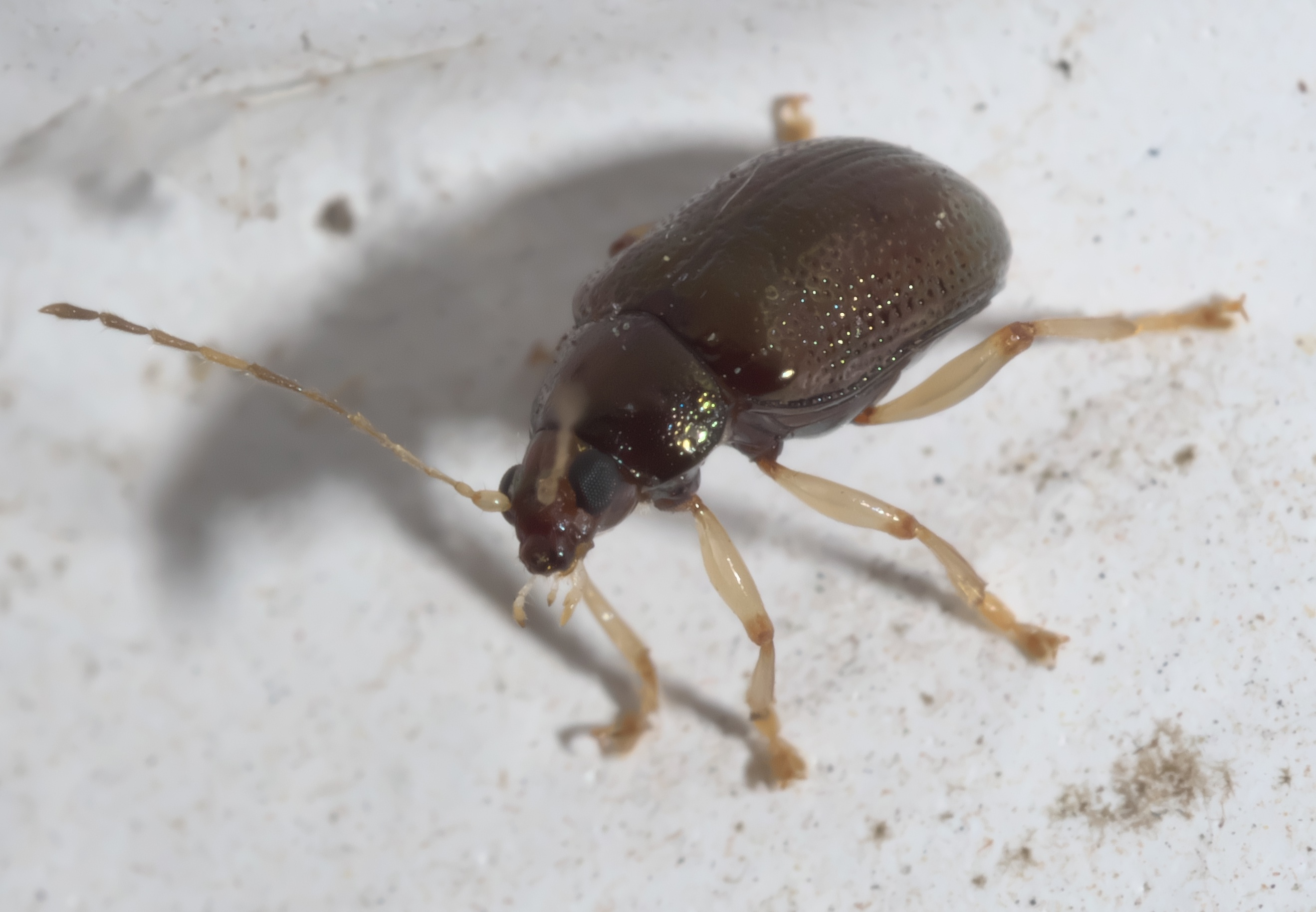

== Species ==
These species belong to the genus Rhabdopterus:

- Rhabdopterus aciculatus Bowditch, 1921
- Rhabdopterus amazonicus Jacoby, 1900
- Rhabdopterus angulicollis Bowditch, 1921
- Rhabdopterus angustipenis Schultz, 1977^{i c g}
- Rhabdopterus apicicornis Jacoby, 1900
- Rhabdopterus apicipes Jacoby, 1900
- Rhabdopterus aureolus Lefèvre, 1891
- Rhabdopterus bacca (Erichson, 1847)
  - Rhabdopterus bacca bacca (Erichson, 1847)
  - Rhabdopterus bacca beniensis Bechyné, 1957
- Rhabdopterus baturitensis Bechyné, 1953
- Rhabdopterus blatchleyi Bowditch, 1921^{i c g}
- Rhabdopterus bottimeri Barber, 1946^{i c g}
- Rhabdopterus bowditchi Barber, 1943^{i c g}
- Rhabdopterus brasiliensis Bechyné, 1950
- Rhabdopterus bricenoi Bechyné, 1997
- Rhabdopterus bucki Bechyné, 1954
- Rhabdopterus caliginosus (Lefèvre, 1878)
- Rhabdopterus caraguatensis Bechyné, 1954
- Rhabdopterus chalceus Lefèvre, 1891
- Rhabdopterus chiliensis Lefèvre, 1885
- Rhabdopterus chontalensis (Jacoby, 1882)
- Rhabdopterus colombiensis Jacoby, 1900
- Rhabdopterus constricticollis Bechyné, 1950
- Rhabdopterus cupreatus Lefèvre, 1885
- Rhabdopterus cuprinus Lefèvre, 1889
- Rhabdopterus curtus (Lefèvre, 1878)
- Rhabdopterus deceptor Barber, 1943^{i c g b}
- Rhabdopterus decipiens Lefèvre, 1886^{g}
- Rhabdopterus delectator Bechyné, 1950
- Rhabdopterus elcieli Moseyko, Maldonado, Ruiz Cancino & Coronado Blanco, 2013
- Rhabdopterus freyi Bechyné, 1950
- Rhabdopterus frontalis Bechyné, 1953
- Rhabdopterus fulvipes (Jacoby, 1882)
- Rhabdopterus fulvus Jacoby, 1890
- Rhabdopterus grenadensis Bowditch, 1921
- Rhabdopterus grossus Bechyné, 1955
- Rhabdopterus guatemalensis (Jacoby, 1882)
- Rhabdopterus hypochalceus (Harold, 1875)
- Rhabdopterus ignotus Bowditch, 1921
- Rhabdopterus imitans Jacoby, 1900
- Rhabdopterus intermedius (Jacoby, 1882)
- Rhabdopterus januarius Bechyné, 1950
  - Rhabdopterus januarius itataiensis Bechyné, 1951
  - Rhabdopterus januarius januarius Bechyné, 1950
- Rhabdopterus kirschi Lefèvre, 1885
- Rhabdopterus lateralis Lefèvre, 1891
- Rhabdopterus limbalis Lefèvre, 1885^{g}
- Rhabdopterus martinezorum Bechyné, 1951
- Rhabdopterus monstrosipes Bechyné, 1951
- Rhabdopterus montalbanus Bechyné, 1997
- Rhabdopterus nigrostillatus Bechyné, 1955
- Rhabdopterus obsitus Lefèvre, 1885
- Rhabdopterus obsoletus Bechyné, 1949
- Rhabdopterus oralis Bechyné, 1953
- Rhabdopterus orthopleurus Bechyné & Bechyne, 1969
- Rhabdopterus panamensis (Blake, 1976)
- Rhabdopterus perplexus (Jacoby, 1882)
- Rhabdopterus peruensis Jacoby, 1900
- Rhabdopterus picipes (Olivier, 1808)^{i c g b} (cranberry rootworm)
- Rhabdopterus plaumanni Bechyné, 1954
- Rhabdopterus praetextus (Say, 1824)^{i c g b}
- Rhabdopterus punctatissimus Bowditch, 1921
- Rhabdopterus punctatosulcatus Lefèvre, 1891
- Rhabdopterus rosenbergi Bowditch, 1921
- Rhabdopterus scabrosus Lefèvre, 1891
- Rhabdopterus similis Bowditch, 1921
- Rhabdopterus spurcaticornis (Erichson, 1847)
- Rhabdopterus subaeneus Scherer, 1964
- Rhabdopterus subelongatus Bechyné, 1951
- Rhabdopterus sulcipennis Bowditch, 1921
- Rhabdopterus tarsatus Bowditch, 1921
- Rhabdopterus thoracicus (Jacoby, 1882)
- Rhabdopterus tuberculatus (Lefèvre, 1878)
- Rhabdopterus uncotibialis (Blake, 1976)
- Rhabdopterus venezuelensis Jacoby, 1900
- Rhabdopterus versutus Lefèvre, 1885
- Rhabdopterus victorianus Bechyné, 1997
- Rhabdopterus weisei (Schaeffer, 1920)^{i c g b}
- Rhabdopterus weyrauchi Bechyné, 1950

Synonyms and species transferred to other genera:

- Rhabdopterus bryanti Bechyné, 1950: transferred to Anachalcoplacis, synonym of Anachalcoplacis fulva fulva (Fabricius, 1801)
- Rhabdopterus circumdatus Lefèvre, 1889: transferred to Isolepronota
- Rhabdopterus fulvicollis Jacoby, 1900: transferred to Chalcoplacis
- Rhabdopterus jansoni (Jacoby, 1882): transferred to Rhabdocolaspis
- Rhabdopterus mexicanus (Jacoby, 1882): transferred to Rhabdocolaspis
- Rhabdopterus virescens (Erichson, 1848)^{g}: transferred to Chalcoplacis

Data sources: i = ITIS, c = Catalogue of Life, g = GBIF, b = Bugguide.net
