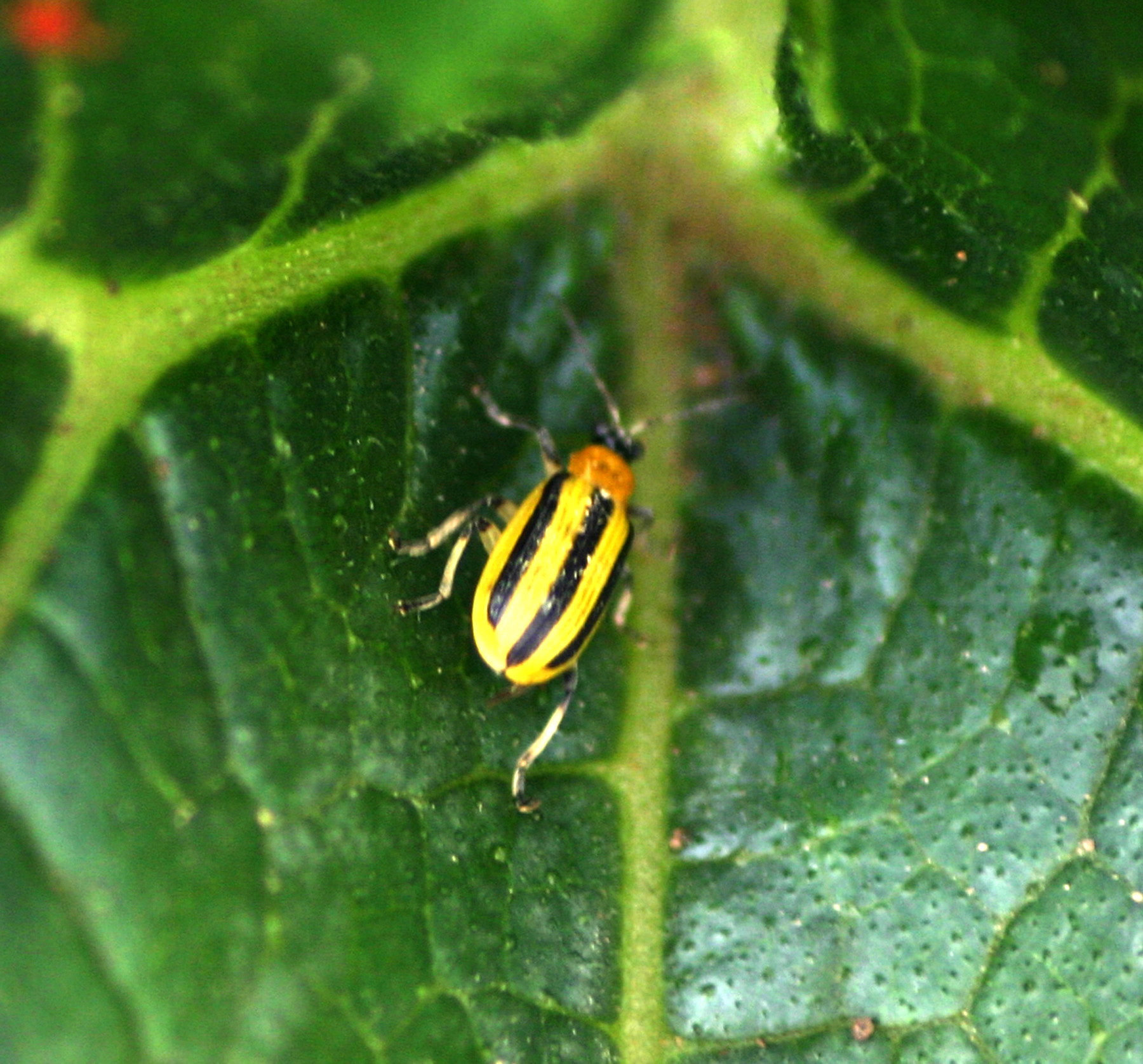
- Striped cucumber beetle (Acalymma vittatum)

Scientific classification
- Kingdom: Animalia
- Phylum: Arthropoda
- Clade: Pancrustacea
- Class: Insecta
- Order: Coleoptera
- Suborder: Polyphaga
- Infraorder: Cucujiformia
- Family: Chrysomelidae
- Subfamily: Galerucinae
- Tribe: Luperini
- Subtribe: Diabroticina
- Genus: Acalymma; Barber, 1947

Type species
- Acalymma gouldi Barber, 1947

= Acalymma =

Genus of beetles

Acalymma is a genus of leaf beetles found mainly in the New World. Approximately 72 species have been described in the Western Hemisphere.

== Pest Species and Impacts ==
In the United States, two species are major pests of cucurbits, the striped cucumber beetle (Acalymma vittatum), which is mainly found east of the Mississippi River, and Acalymma trivittatum which is mostly found west of the Mississippi. Adults feed on young leaves, and larvae can damage roots. A. vittatum vectors bacterial wilt Erwinia tracheiphila Holland (Enterobacteriales: Enterobacteriaceae) to the plants as it pierces plant stems to suck juices.

== Species included ==
The genus includes the following species:

- Acalymma albidovittatum (Baly, 1889) – cucumber beetle
- Acalymma bechynei Cabrera, 1999
- Acalymma bertoluccii Gilbert & Clark, 2007
- Acalymma bivittulum (Kirsch, 1883) (Synonym: A. xanthographa Bechyné, 1955)
- Acalymma blandulum (LeConte, 1868)
- Acalymma blomorum Munroe & Smith, 1980
- Acalymma bruchii (Bowditch, 1911)
- Acalymma caucum Bechyné, 1956
- Acalymma cornutum (Baly, 1886)
- Acalymma cryptogrammum Bechyné & Bechyné, 1968
- Acalymma fairmairei (Baly, 1886)
- Acalymma flavovittatum (Baly, 1886)
- Acalymma gouldi Barber, 1947
- Acalymma hirtum
- Acalymma horni (Jacoby, 1887)
- Acalymma incum
- Acalymma innubum (Fabricius, 1775)
- Acalymma invenustum Munroe & Smith, 1980
- Acalymma isogenum Bechyné & Bechyné, 1968
- Acalymma longicolle (Jacoby, 1887)
- Acalymma luridifrons Munroe & Smith, 1980
- Acalymma mysticum (Jacoby, 1887)
- Acalymma obscurofasciatum (Jacoby, 1887)
- Acalymma palomarense Munroe & Smith, 1980
- Acalymma peregrinum (Jacoby, 1892)
- Acalymma punctatum Bechyné, 1958
- Acalymma semifemoratum (Gahan, 1891)
- Acalymma solarianum Bechyné & Bechyné, 1962
- Acalymma subaeneum
- Acalymma thiemei
- Acalymma trivittatum (Mannerheim, 1843) – western striped cucumber beetle
- Acalymma vinctum (LeConte, 1878)
- Acalymma vittatum (Fabricius, 1775) – striped cucumber beetle
- Acalymma vittigerum (Boheman, 1859)
