= Rhabdopterus deceptor =

Scientific classification
- Kingdom: Animalia
- Phylum: Arthropoda
- Clade: Pancrustacea
- Class: Insecta
- Order: Coleoptera
- Suborder: Polyphaga
- Infraorder: Cucujiformia
- Family: Chrysomelidae
- Genus: Rhabdopterus
- Species: R. deceptor

Binomial name
- Rhabdopterus deceptor Barber, 1943

Synonyms
- Rhabdopterus praetexta (Say, 1824) (misidentification)

Species of beetle

Rhabdopterus deceptor is a species of leaf beetle. It is found in North America.
