= Acalymma peregrinum =

Scientific classification
- Kingdom: Animalia
- Phylum: Arthropoda
- Clade: Pancrustacea
- Class: Insecta
- Order: Coleoptera
- Suborder: Polyphaga
- Infraorder: Cucujiformia
- Family: Chrysomelidae
- Genus: Acalymma
- Species: A. peregrinum

Binomial name
- Acalymma peregrinum (Jacoby, 1892)

Species of beetle

Acalymma peregrinum is a species of skeletonizing leaf beetle in the family Chrysomelidae. It is found in Central America and North America.
