= Rhabdopterus picipes =

- Cranberry rootworm grub forms

Scientific classification
- Kingdom: Animalia
- Phylum: Arthropoda
- Clade: Pancrustacea
- Class: Insecta
- Order: Coleoptera
- Suborder: Polyphaga
- Infraorder: Cucujiformia
- Family: Chrysomelidae
- Genus: Rhabdopterus
- Species: R. picipes

Binomial name
- Rhabdopterus picipes (Olivier, 1808)

Synonyms
- Colaspis picipes Olivier, 1808

Species of beetle

Rhabdopterus picipes, the cranberry rootworm, is a species of leaf beetle. It is found in North America.
