= Acalymma albidovittatum =

Scientific classification
- Kingdom: Animalia
- Phylum: Arthropoda
- Class: Insecta
- Order: Coleoptera
- Suborder: Polyphaga
- Infraorder: Cucujiformia
- Family: Chrysomelidae
- Genus: Acalymma
- Species: A. albidovittatum

Binomial name
- Acalymma albidovittatum (Baly, 1889)

Species of beetle

The cucumber beetle (Acalymma albidovittatum) is a beetle of the family Chrysomelidae and a serious pest of cucurbit crops in subtropical and tropical South America; Argentina, Bolivia and Brazil.
