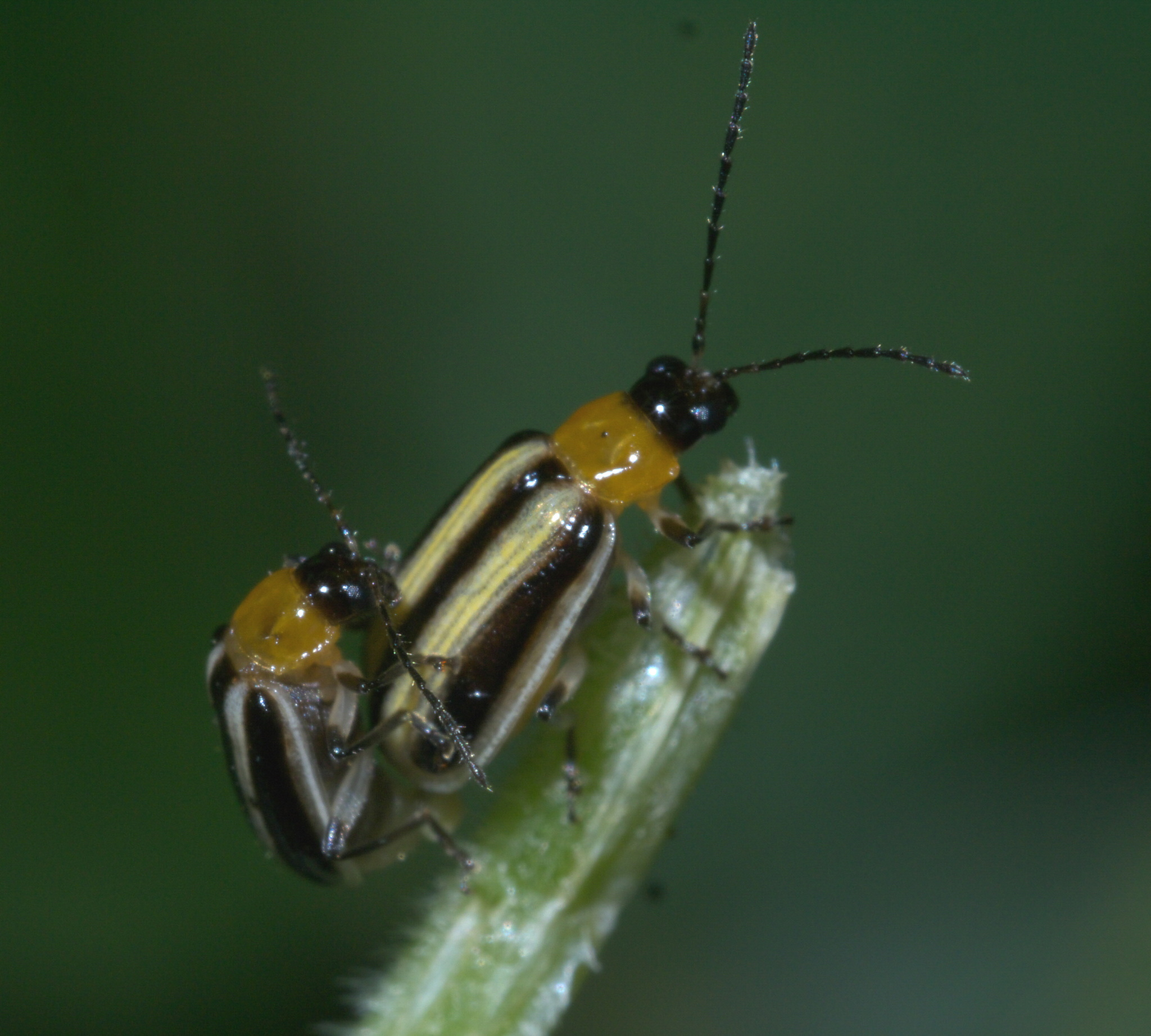
- Acalymma blandulum, Oklahoma

Scientific classification
- Kingdom: Animalia
- Phylum: Arthropoda
- Clade: Pancrustacea
- Class: Insecta
- Order: Coleoptera
- Suborder: Polyphaga
- Infraorder: Cucujiformia
- Family: Chrysomelidae
- Genus: Acalymma
- Species: A. blandulum

Binomial name
- Acalymma blandulum (J. L. LeConte, 1868)

= Acalymma blandulum =

Species of beetle

Acalymma blandulum is a species of skeletonizing leaf beetle in the family Chrysomelidae. It is found in the United States and Mexico.

== Subspecies ==
There are three subspecies of Acalymma blandulum:

- A. blandulum blandulum (J. L. LeConte, 1868) – United States: Arizona, Colorado, Kansas, New Mexico, Oklahoma, Texas; Mexico: Chiapas, Chihuahua, Coahuila, Durango, Oaxaca, Querétaro, San Luis Potosí, Tamaulipas, Veracruz, Zacatecas.
- A. blandulum nigriventre Munroe & Smith, 1980 – Mexico: Chihuahua, Durango, Jalisco, Mexico, Zacatecas.
- A. blandulum yucatanense Munroe & Smith, 1980 – Mexico: Campeche, Quintana Roo, Yucatán.
