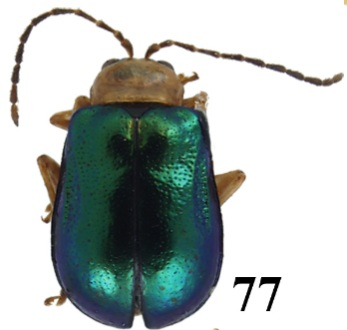

Scientific classification
- Kingdom: Animalia
- Phylum: Arthropoda
- Clade: Pancrustacea
- Class: Insecta
- Order: Coleoptera
- Suborder: Polyphaga
- Infraorder: Cucujiformia
- Family: Chrysomelidae
- Genus: Acalymma
- Species: A. mysticum

Binomial name
- Acalymma mysticum (Jacoby, 1887)

Synonyms
- Diabrotica mystica Jacoby, 1887

= Acalymma mysticum =

Species of beetle

Acalymma mysticum is a species of beetle of the family Chrysomelidae. It is found in Mexico and Guatemala.
