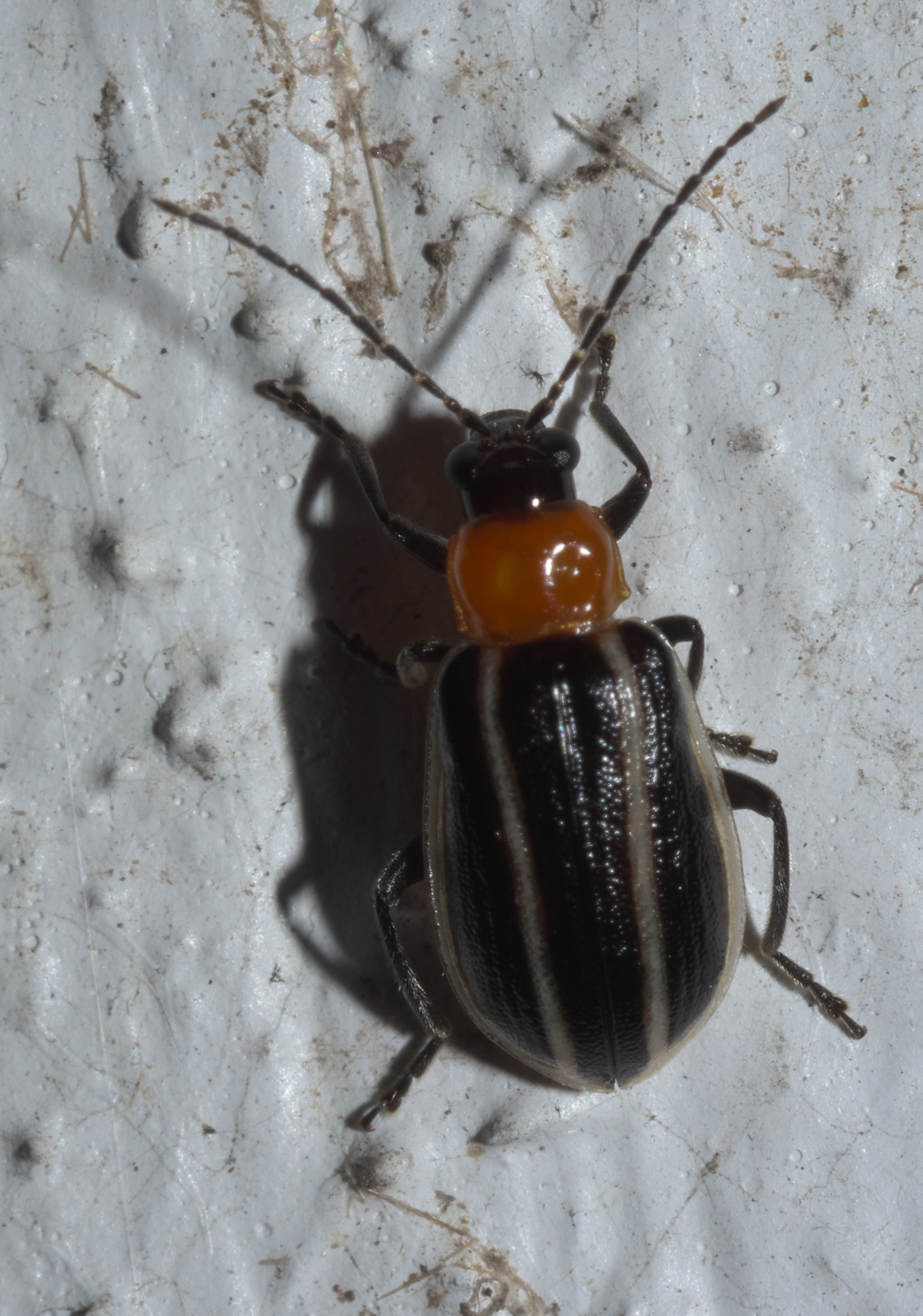

Scientific classification
- Kingdom: Animalia
- Phylum: Arthropoda
- Clade: Pancrustacea
- Class: Insecta
- Order: Coleoptera
- Suborder: Polyphaga
- Infraorder: Cucujiformia
- Family: Chrysomelidae
- Genus: Acalymma
- Species: A. vinctum

Binomial name
- Acalymma vinctum (J. L. LeConte, 1878)

= Acalymma vinctum =

Species of beetle

Acalymma vinctum is a species of skeletonizing leaf beetle in the family Chrysomelidae. It is found in North America.
