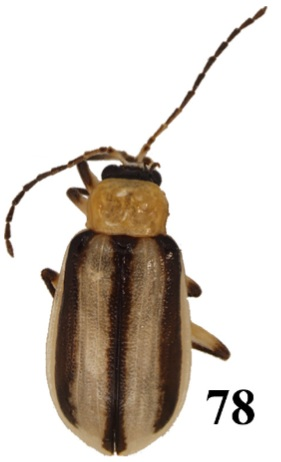

Scientific classification
- Kingdom: Animalia
- Phylum: Arthropoda
- Clade: Pancrustacea
- Class: Insecta
- Order: Coleoptera
- Suborder: Polyphaga
- Infraorder: Cucujiformia
- Family: Chrysomelidae
- Genus: Acalymma
- Species: A. gouldi

Binomial name
- Acalymma gouldi Barber, 1947

= Acalymma gouldi =

Species of beetle

Acalymma gouldi is a leaf beetle species in the genus Acalymma found in North America. It can be found on the foliage of Echinocystis lobata as well as Cucurbita and Cucumeris melo.
