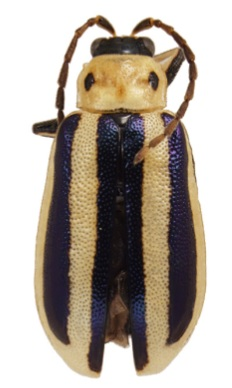

Scientific classification
- Kingdom: Animalia
- Phylum: Arthropoda
- Clade: Pancrustacea
- Class: Insecta
- Order: Coleoptera
- Suborder: Polyphaga
- Infraorder: Cucujiformia
- Family: Chrysomelidae
- Genus: Amphelasma
- Species: A. cavum

Binomial name
- Amphelasma cavum (Say, 1835)

Synonyms
- Galeruca cava Say, 1835; Diabrotica vicina Jacoby, 1887

= Amphelasma cavum =

Species of beetle

Amphelasma cavum is a species of beetle of the family Chrysomelidae. It is found in Mexico and Arizona.

== Description ==
Adults reach a length of about 5.5 mm.

== Subspecies ==
- Amphelasma cavum cavum
- Amphelasma cavum vicinum Jacoby, 1887
