= Rhabdopterus praetextus =

Scientific classification
- Kingdom: Animalia
- Phylum: Arthropoda
- Clade: Pancrustacea
- Class: Insecta
- Order: Coleoptera
- Suborder: Polyphaga
- Infraorder: Cucujiformia
- Family: Chrysomelidae
- Genus: Rhabdopterus
- Species: R. praetextus

Binomial name
- Rhabdopterus praetextus (Say, 1824)

Synonyms
- Colaspis pretexa Say, 1824; Rhabdopterus spiculatus Barber, 1943

Species of beetle

Rhabdopterus praetextus is a species of leaf beetle. It is found in North America.
