= Roberto Kolter =

Microbiologist and teacher, born 1953

- Born: 1953 (age 72–73); Guatemala
- Known for: Biofilms, stationary phase, antibiotic biosynthesis
- Scientific career
- Fields: Microbiology, molecular genetics, chemical ecology, molecular microbiology, microbial ecology
- Workplaces: Harvard Medical School
- Doctoral advisor: Donald Helinski
- Other academic advisors: Charles Yanofsky
- Website: http://gasp.med.harvard.edu/

Roberto Kolter is professor of microbiology, emeritus, at Harvard Medical School, an author, and past president of the American Society for Microbiology. Kolter has been a professor at Harvard Medical School since 1983 and was Co-director of Harvard's Microbial Sciences Initiative from 2003-2018. During the 35-year term of the Kolter laboratory from 1983 to 2018, more than 130 graduate students and postdoctoral trainees explored an eclectic mix of topics gravitating around the study of microbes. Kolter is a fellow of the American Association for the Advancement of Science and of the American Academy of Microbiology.

As professor emeritus, Kolter has continued his involvement in science by communicating microbiology to scientific and general audiences. Since 2016, Kolter has been co-blogger (with Moselio Schaechter) of the popular microbiology blog, Small Things Considered. From 2014 to 2018, Kolter and Scott Chimileski developed two exhibitions at the Harvard Museum of Natural History: World in a Drop, open in 2017, and Microbial Life, open through 2020. In parallel, Chimileski and Kolter wrote the book Life at the Edge of Sight: A Photographic Exploration of the Microbial World (Harvard University Press, 2017). During a 2018 interview at EAFIT University in Colombia, Kolter explained that he is "in a more contemplative phase of his career," adding that he is enjoying "being able to exercise a little more the 'Ph' (Philosophy) of my PhD".

== Early life, education and academic career ==
Kolter was born and raised in Guatemala. He received a Bachelor of Science degree in biology from Carnegie Mellon University in 1975 and a PhD in biology from the University of California, San Diego in 1979. He was then a Helen Hay Whitney Postdoctoral Fellow at Stanford University with Charles Yanofsky from 1980 to 1983. Kolter joined the faculty at Harvard Medical School as an assistant professor in 1983, was promoted to associate professor in 1989, professor in 1994, and became professor emeritus upon his retirement from running a research laboratory in 2018.

== Research ==
=== Summary ===
The research activities of Kolter's laboratory at Harvard Medical School from 1983 to 2018 encompassed several major parallel lines of investigation and spanned many interrelated subfields of microbiology. The overarching theme of the laboratory was to use genetic approaches to study physiological processes (and associated emergent properties) that bacteria have evolved to respond to stressful conditions in the environment, like starvation or limited nutrients, or as a result of ecological interactions with other living organisms. The eclectic nature of Kolter's research program was also a result of his policy of encouraging postdoctoral scientists to explore independent interests. In an interview with Nature in 2015, Kolter was quoted on this mentorship style: "I let postdocs explore what they want to explore, as long as it is within the sphere of my interest."

In total, Kolter has co-authored over 250 research and other scholarly articles which together have been cited over 50,000 times. Kolter's research group was influential in the study of bacterial transport systems known as ABC exporters, published some of the earliest examples of experimental evolution through investigations of the stationary phase of bacterial growth, and was foundational in genetic studies of bacteria adhered to surfaces (living within communities called biofilms). The lab popularized the concept of bacterial biofilm formation as developmental or multicellular microbial processes, and pioneered genetic studies of cellular differentiation, signaling, and division of labor in bacteria. In addition, his group has worked on other aspects of bacterial physiology, the domestication of lab strains of bacteria, microbiome ecology, interactions between plants and bacteria, bacterial respiration processes, and bioactive compound discovery.

Some of Kolter's significant scientific contributions are categorized below in chronological order.

=== Major topics of investigation ===
==== Regulation of DNA replication ====
As a graduate student, Kolter's research provided early evidence for what was called the "replicon hypothesis," proposed by Jacob, Brenner and Cuzin in 1962. His work defined an origin of DNA replication that led to the development of many suicide cloning vectors still in use today.

- Kolter, R; Helinski, DR (1978). "Construction of plasmid R6K derivatives in vitro: characterization of the R6K replication region". Plasmid. 1 (4): 571–80. doi:10.1016/0147-619X(78)90014-8. PMID 372982.
- Kolter, R; Inuzuka, M; Helinski, DR (Dec 1978). "Trans-complementation-dependent replication of a low molecular weight origin fragment from plasmid R6K". Cell. 15 (4): 1199–208. doi:10.1016/0092-8674(78)90046-6. PMID 728998. S2CID 20082813.
- Kolter, R; Helinski, DR (1982). "Plasmid R6K DNA replication. II. Direct nucleotide sequence repeats are required for an active gamma-origin". J Mol Biol. 161 (1): 45–56. doi:10.1016/0022-2836(82)90277-7. PMID 6296394.

==== Peptide antibiotic biosynthesis and ABC exporters ====
As a new faculty member at Harvard Medical school in the 1980s, Kolter's research group made use of Escherichia coli as a model organism for understanding the molecular genetics of antibiotic biosynthesis. During the course of this work the group was among the first to characterize ABC exporters, today known to be one of the most important membrane protein systems that move molecules across the cell membrane.

- Gilson, L; Mahanty, HK; Kolter, R (1990). "Genetic analysis of an MDR-like export system: the secretion of colicin V". EMBO J. 9 (12): 3875–84. doi:10.1002/j.1460-2075.1990.tb07606.x. PMC 552155. PMID 2249654.
- Fath, MJ; Kolter, R (1993). "ABC transporters: bacterial exporters". Microbiol. Rev. 57 (4): 995–1017. doi:10.1128/mmbr.57.4.995-1017.1993. PMC 372944. PMID 8302219.
- Yorgey, P; Lee, J; Kördel, J; Vivas, E; Warner, P; Jebaratnam, D; Kolter, R (1994). "Posttranslational modifications in microcin B17 define an additional class of DNA gyrase inhibitor". Proc Natl Acad Sci U S A. 91 (10): 4519–23. Bibcode:1994PNAS...91.4519Y. doi:10.1073/pnas.91.10.4519. PMC 43817. PMID 8183941.

==== Physiology and evolution during stationary phase ====
In the late 1980s, Kolter's research group became interested in bacteria living in the stationary phase of the growth cycle, a state more like the natural conditions that bacteria experience in environments outside of the laboratory. The group discovered regulatory systems exclusive to cells in this non-growing state and found that mutants with greater fitness in stationary phase evolved and rapidly took over the cultures. The Zambrano et al. paper in 1993 which published this finding was one of the earliest examples of evolution occurring in the laboratory, or experimental evolution.

- Almirón, M; Link, AJ; Furlong, D; Kolter (1992). "Escherichia coli". Genes Dev. 6 (12B): 2646–54. doi:10.1101/gad.6.12b.2646. PMID 1340475. S2CID 10308477.
- Siegele, D; Kolter, R (1992). "Life after log". J Bacteriol. 174 (2): 345–348. doi:10.1128/jb.174.2.345-348.1992. PMC 205722. PMID 1729229.
- Zambrano, MM; Siegele, DA; Almirón, M; Tormo, A; Kolter (1993). "Escherichia coli mutants that take over stationary phase cultures". Science. 259 (5102): 1757–60. Bibcode:1993Sci...259.1757M. doi:10.1126/science.7681219. PMID 7681219. S2CID 680360.
- Kolter, R; Siegele, DA; Tormo, A (1993). "The stationary phase of the bacterial life cycle". Annu Rev Microbiol. 47: 855–74. doi:10.1146/annurev.mi.47.100193.004231. PMID 8257118.
- Zambrano, MM; Kolter, R (1996). "GASPing for life in stationary phase". Cell. 86 (2): 181–4. doi:10.1016/s0092-8674(00)80089-6. PMID 8706122. S2CID 13569021.

==== Bacterial biofilms ====
In the 1990s, Kolter's group began to focus on the regulation and genetic components of surface-associated communities of bacteria called biofilms. Before then, biofilms had been discovered and were studied in the context of biofouling and in engineering solutions to prevent biofouling, but the genetics of biofilm formation was unexplored and most microbiologists did not view biofilm formation as a physiological process of bacterial cells. The lab went on to discover major regulatory systems underpinning biofilm development and characterized key materials within the extracellular matrix of biofilms using model species like Pseudomonas aeruginosa, Escherichia coli, Vibrio cholerae, and Bacillus subtilis. Microbial biofilms have since become a major field of microbiology, recognized as a predominant lifestyle of microbes in nature, with relevance to medicine and infections caused by pathogenic bacteria.

- O'Toole, GA; Kolter, R (1998). "Initiation of biofilm formation in Pseudomonas fluorescens WCS365 proceeds via multiple, convergent signaling pathways: a genetic analysis". Mol Microbiol. 28 (3): 449–61. doi:10.1046/j.1365-2958.1998.00797.x. PMID 9632250. S2CID 43897816.
- O'Toole, GA; Flagellar, Kolter R. (1998). "Pseudomonas aeruginosa biofilm development". Mol Microbiol. 30 (2): 295–304. doi:10.1046/j.1365-2958.1998.01062.x. PMID 9791175. S2CID 25140899.
- O'Toole, G; Kaplan, HB; Kolter, R (2000). "Biofilm formation as microbial development". Annu Rev Microbiol. 54: 49–79. doi:10.1146/annurev.micro.54.1.49. PMID 11018124.
- Branda, SS; González-Pastor, JE; Ben-Yehuda, S; Losick, R; Kolter, R (2001). "Fruiting body formation by Bacillus subtilis". Proc Natl Acad Sci USA. 98 (20): 11621–6. Bibcode:2001PNAS...9811621B. doi:10.1073/pnas.191384198. PMC 58779. PMID 11572999.

==== Microbial intraspecies interactions, cell differentiation & division of labor ====
Another body of research stemmed from work on biofilms in the Kolter group in collaboration with the laboratory of Richard Losick: the discovery that subpopulations of different functional cell types develop within single-species biofilms of the bacterium Bacillus subtilis. Some cells were found to express genes for motility, others for sporulation, cannibalism, surfactant production or the secretion of extracellular matrix. Some cell types were found localized in clusters in different physical locations and time points during biofilm development. Another study from the group in 2015 showed that collective behaviors like group migration across a surface can emerge due to interactions between multiple cell types.

- Vlamakis, H; Aguilar, C; Losick, R; Kolter, R (2008). "Control of cell fate by the formation of an architecturally complex bacterial community". Genes Dev. 22 (7): 945–53. doi:10.1101/gad.1645008. PMC 2279205. PMID 18381896.
- López, D; Vlamakis, H; Losick, R; Kolter, R (2009). "Paracrine signaling in a bacterium". Genes Dev. 23 (14): 1631–1638. doi:10.1101/gad.1813709. PMC 2714712. PMID 19605685.
- López, D; Vlamakis, H; Losick, R; Kolter, R (2009). "Cannibalism Enhances Biofilm Development in Bacillus subtilis.". Mol Microbiol. 74 (3): 609–618. doi:10.1111/j.1365-2958.2009.06882.x. PMC 2983100. PMID 19775247.
- van Gestel, J; Vlamakis, H; Kolter; Collectives, Cell (2015). "Bacillus subtilis Uses Division of Labor to Migrate". PLOS Biol. 13 (4): 4. doi:10.1371/journal.pbio.1002141. PMC 4403855. PMID 25894589.
- Lyons, NA; Kraigher, B; Stefanic, P; Mandic-Mulec, I; Kolter (2016). "Bacillus subtilis". Curr Biol. 26 (6): 733–42. doi:10.1016/j.cub.2016.01.032. PMC 4803606. PMID 26923784.

==== Microbial interspecies interactions ====
Much of Kolter's most recent work focused on interactions between several species in mixed communities, as they typically exist in natural environments. This work has produced several influential studies of the emergent properties and social behaviors of microbes while interacting with other species.

- Hogan, DA; Kolter, R (2002). "Pseudomonas-Candida interactions: an ecological role for virulence factors". Science. 296 (5576): 2229–32. Bibcode:2002Sci...296.2229H. doi:10.1126/science.1070784. PMID 12077418. S2CID 23124129.
- Shank, EA; Klepac-Ceraj, V; Collado-Torres, L; Powers, GE; Losick, R; Kolter (2011). "Bacillus subtilis forming biofilms are mediated mainly by members of its own genus". Proc Natl Acad Sci U S A. 108 (48): E1236–43. doi:10.1073/pnas.1103630108. PMC 3228442. PMID 22074846.
- Traxler, MF; Watrous, JD; Alexandrov, T; Dorrestein, PC; Kolter, R (2013). "Interspecies interactions stimulate diversification of the Streptomyces coelicolor secreted metabolome". mBio. 4 (4): 4. doi:10.1128/mbio.00459-13. PMC 3747584. PMID 23963177.
- Segev E, Wyche TP, Kim KH, Petersen J, Ellebrandt C, Vlamakis H, Barteneva N, Paulson JN, Chai L, Clardy J, Kolter R. Dynamic metabolic exchange governs a marine algal-bacterial interaction. 2017. eLife.
- Lyons NA, Kolter R. Bacillus subtilis Protects Public Goods by Extending Kin Discrimination to Closely Related Species. mBio. 2017; 8 no. 4e00723-17.

== Communication of microbial science to the public ==
Kolter is an advocate and participant in the communication of microbial science to early career microbiologists and non-scientific audiences. His work in this area began during his term as Co-Director of the Harvard Microbial Sciences Initiative from 2003 to 2018. In this role, Kolter organized an annual public lecture in Cambridge, Massachusetts on topics of general relevance, such as microbial foods and drinks like cheese, sake and wine. His work in science communication then intensified in the years leading up to his retirement and now as an emeritus professor through invited lectures, writing and museum projects.

=== Books ===
- Germ Stories by Arthur Kornberg, 2007 (provided photography) ISBN 1891389513
- March of the Microbes by John Ingraham (authored a foreword) ISBN 0674064097
- Microbes and Evolution:The World Darwin Never Saw, 2012, co-edited with Stanley Maloy, American Society of Microbiology Press, ISBN 1891389513
- Life at the Edge of Sight: A Photographic Exploration of the Microbial World, 2017, coauthored with Scott Chimileski, Harvard University Press, ISBN 067497591X

=== Museum exhibitions ===
From 2014 through 2018, Kolter and Scott Chimileski spearheaded two public exhibitions at the Harvard Museum of Natural History. World in a Drop: Photographic Explorations of Microbial Life was an artistic exhibition that featured imagery produced through Chimileski and Kolter's collaboration, and was open from August 2017 to January 2018. Subsequently, Microbial Life: A Universe at the Edge of Sight opened in February 2018 as major special exhibition supported by the Alfred P. Sloan Foundation. Kolter and Chimileski are guest curators of Microbial Life and the exhibition remains open until March 2020. These exhibitions have traveled internationally at the Eden Project in the UK and EAFIT University in Medellín, Colombia, among other locations.

Chimileski and Kolter were also advisors and contributed imagery for Invisible Worlds at the Eden Project, a permanent exhibition sponsored by the Welcome Trust. Their still and time-lapse imagery was featured in the Bacterial World Exhibition at the Oxford University Museum of Natural History in 2018, and in the World Unseen: Intersections of Art and Science at the David J. Sencer CDC Museum in Atlanta, Georgia in 2019.

== Teaching and editing ==
Kolter has a long record of teaching at Harvard University and at international summer courses. At Harvard he taught Biofilm Dynamics and he is currently developing a Massive Open Online Course with HarvardX on fermentation and microbial foods. He is a regular instructor at the Microbial Diversity Course at the Marine Biological Laboratory in Woods Hole, Massachusetts, the EMBO-FEBES summer microbiology course in Spetses, Greece and the John Innes/Rudjer Bošković Summer School in Applied Molecular Microbiology in Dubrovnik, Croatia. In 2000, he received the ASM International Professorship Award.

Kolter has been the cover editor of the Journal of Bacteriology since 1999 and was previously on the Board of Reviewing Editors for Science, mBio, and eLife.
