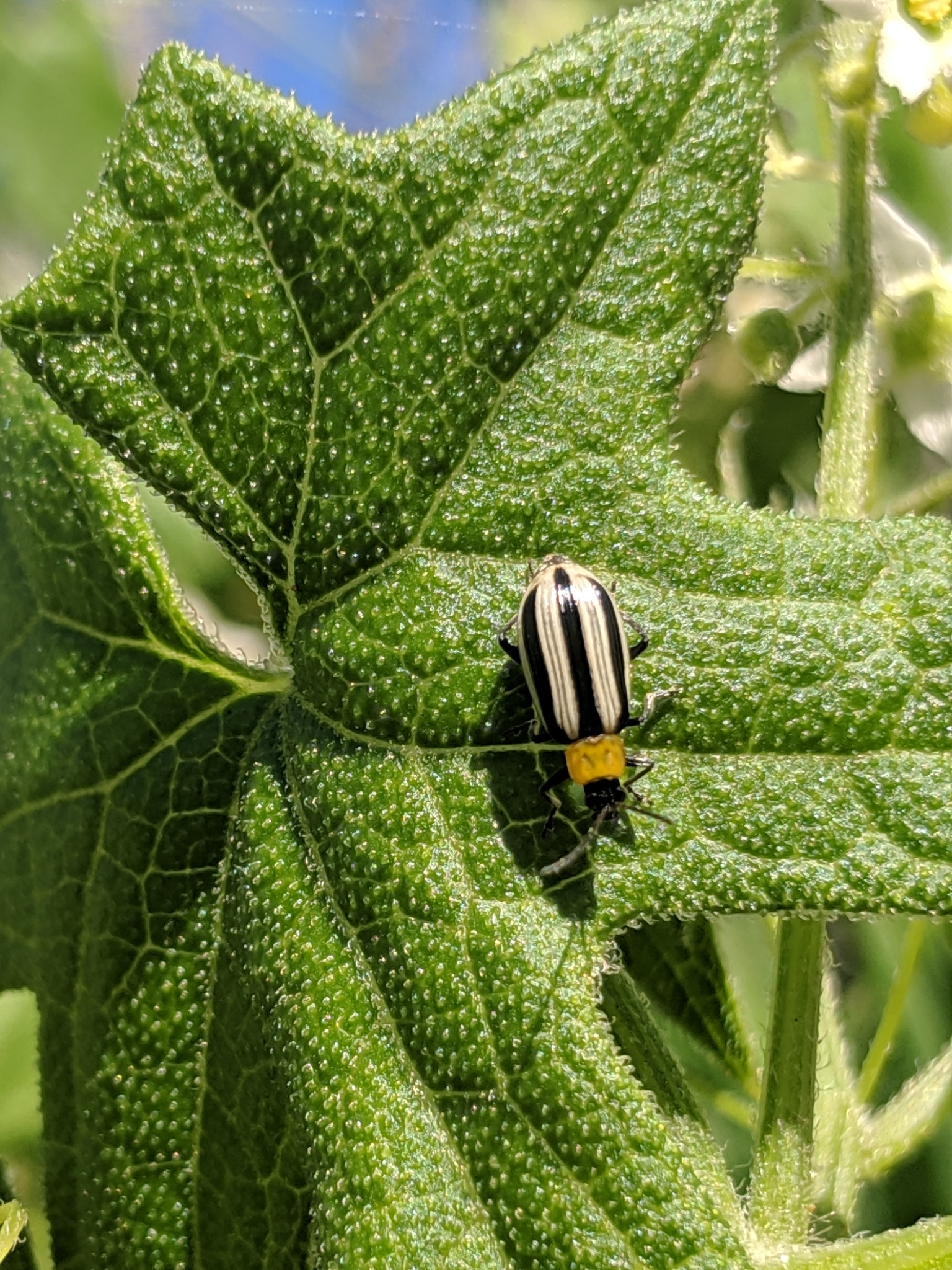

Scientific classification
- Kingdom: Animalia
- Phylum: Arthropoda
- Clade: Pancrustacea
- Class: Insecta
- Order: Coleoptera
- Suborder: Polyphaga
- Infraorder: Cucujiformia
- Family: Chrysomelidae
- Genus: Acalymma
- Species: A. trivittatum

Binomial name
- Acalymma trivittatum (Mannerheim, 1843)

= Acalymma trivittatum =

Species of beetle

Acalymma trivittatum, the western striped cucumber beetle, is a species of leaf beetle in the family Chrysomelidae. It is found in Central America and North America. It is considered a key pest on crops in the Cucurbitaceae family.
