= Herbert Spencer Barber =

American entomologist (1882–1950)

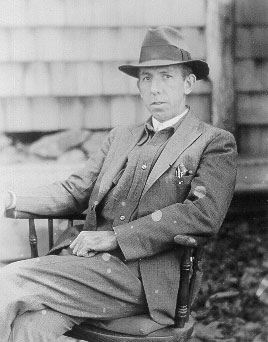
- Born: 1882
- Died: 1950 (aged 67–68)
- Scientific career
- Fields: Entomology

Herbert Spencer Barber (1882 – 1950) was an American entomologist.

Herbert was born on April 12, 1882, in Yankton, South Dakota, to Amherst Willoughby and Velma Barber. His father, a civil engineer, was greatly interested in natural sciences. He grew up attending public schools in Orlando, Florida, and then attended high school for two years in Washington, D.C. Beyond this he received very little formal education, although he did take some night classes.

As a child he had become interested in insects, and in 1898 he worked with Dr. E. A. Schwarz as assistant preparator of insects in the National Museum in Washington. He held his position until 1902 and came back again from 1904 to 1908. During the years 1902 to 1904 he studied cotton insects in southern fields under the Bureau of Entomology in the U.S. Department of Agriculture. Starting in 1908 on he worked as a specialist on beetles in the Division of Insect Identification of the Bureau of Entomology and Plant Quarantine of the U.S. Department of Agriculture. Until Dr. Schwarz died in 1928, Barber continued to work closely with him at the National Museum.

In 1913, Barber published two papers about Micromalthus debilis, a small wood-boring beetle. He had discovered that there are several distinct types of larvae in this species and that under certain conditions larvae will produce both eggs and live larvae. This has since been confirmed by other scientists, but initially it was doubted by many entomologists. This was potentially his greatest single discovery, which occurred only fifteen years after he had his first exposure to entomological work.

Barber was a naturalist with wide interests. He was an internationally recognized authority on chrysomelid, bruchid, and lampyrid beetles and often was consulted for his knowledge of Coleoptera as well as many other subjects. He traveled to collect insects to many parts of the United States, Mexico, and Guatemala.

Barber belonged to the American Association for the Advancement of Science, the Entomological Society of Washington, the Coleopterists's Society, the Entomological Society of America, the American Association of Economic Entomologists, the Biological Society of Washington, the Washington Academy of Sciences, and the Potomac Appalachian Trail Club.

As a member of the Washington Biologists' Field Club, Barber spent a lot of time on Plummers Island studying the beetles there with Dr. Schwartz.

Barber died on June 1, 1950.
