= List of Galerucinae genera =

The Galerucinae are one of the largest subfamilies of leaf beetles (Chrysomelidae). In the traditional sense of the subfamily, excluding the flea beetles, it includes over 7000 species in over 500 genera.

== A ==
- Abdullahius Abdullah & Qureshi, 1968
- Acalymma Barber, 1947
- Adoxia Broun, 1880
- Aelianus Jacoby, 1892
- Afrocandezea Wagner & Scherz, 2002
- Afrocrania Hincks, 1949
- Afromaculepta Hasenkamp & Wagner, 2000
- Afromegalepta Schmitz & Wagner, 2001
- Afronaumannia Steiner & Wagner, 2005
- Afropachylepta Esch & Wagner, 2009
- Afrorudolphia Bolz & Wagner, 2014
- Afrosoma Wilcox, 1973
- Afrotizea Stapel & Wagner, 2001
- Agelacida Jacoby, 1898
- Agelasa Motschulsky, 1861
- Agelastica Chevrolat, 1836
- Agelopsis Jacoby, 1896
- Agetocera Hope, 1831
- Allastena Broun, 1893
- Alopena Baly, 1864
- Alphidia Clark, 1865
- Amandus Jacoby, 1886
- Amphelasma Barber, 1947
- Amplioluperus Viswajyothi & Clark, 2022
- Anadimonia Ogloblin, 1936
- Anatela Silfverberg, 1982
- Androlyperus Crotch, 1873
- Anisobrotica Bechyné & Bechyné, 1970
- Anoides Weise, 1913
- Anomalonyx Weise, 1903
- Anthiphula Jacoby, 1892
- Antsianaka Duvivier, 1891
- Aplosonyx Chevrolat, 1836
- Apophylia Thomson, 1858 (= Apophylana Medvedev, 2019)
- Apteraulamorphus Beenen, 2010
- Apterogaleruca Chûjô, 1962
- Apteromicrus Chen & Jiang, 1981
- Apteroyinga Viswajyothi & Clark, 2020
- Arcastes Baly, 1865
- Arima Chapuis, 1875
- Arimetus Jacoby, 1903
- Aristobrotica Bechyné, 1956
- Arthrotidea Chen, 1942
- Arthrotus Motschulsky, 1858
- Asbecesta Harold, 1877
- Ashrafia Abdullah & Qureshi, 1968
- Astena Baly, 1865
- Astridella Laboissière, 1932
- Atrachya Dejean, 1836
- Atysa Baly, 1864
- Aulacophora Chevrolat, 1836
- Aulamorphoides Laboissière, 1926
- Aulamorphus Jacoby, 1897
- Austrochorina Bechyné, 1963
- Austrotella Silfverberg, 1975
- Azlania Mohamedsaid, 1996

== B ==
- Bacteriaspis Weise, 1905
- Bangprella Kimoto, 1989
- Barombiella Laboissière, 1931
- Beenenia Bezděk, 2012
- Beiratia Jacoby, 1906
- Belarima Reitter, 1913
- Bicolorizea Heunemann, Dalstein, Schulze & Wagner, 2015
- Bipleura Laboissière, 1932
- Bonesia Baly, 1865
- Bonesioides Laboissière, 1925
- Borneola Mohamedsaid, 1998
- Borneotheopea Lee & Bezděk, 2020
- Brachyphora Jacoby, 1890
- Brachyruca Fairmaire, 1898
- Bradamina Fairmaire, 1904
- Brucita Wilcox, 1965
- Bryantiella Medvedev, 2009
- Bryobates Broun, 1886
- Buckibrotica Bechyné & Bechyné, 1970
- Buphonella Jacoby, 1903
- Buphonida Baly, 1865
- Burudromas Beenen, 2017
- Byblitea Baly, 1864

== C ==
- Calaina Schaufuss, 1887
- Calomicrella Medvedev & Bezděk, 2002
- †Calomicroides Nadein, 2016
- Calomicrus Dillwyn, 1829
- Candezeososia Laboissière, 1932
- Candezea Chapuis, 1879
- Candezoides Duvivier, 1891
- Cannonia Hincks, 1949
- Capula Jacobson, 1925
- Caraguata Bechyné, 1954
- Carpiradialis Niño-Maldonado & Clark, 2020
- Cassena Weise, 1892
- Cassenoides Kimoto, 1989
- Ceratocalymma Hincks, 1949
- Cerochroa Gerstaecker, 1855
- Cerophysa Chevrolat, 1836
- Cerophysella Laboissière, 1930
- Cerotoma Chevrolat, 1836
- Chapuisia Duvivier, 1885
- Charaea Baly, 1878 (= Cneorides Jacoby, 1896)
- Chikatunolepta Bezděk, 2020
- Chinochya Lee, 2020
- Chlamigala Medvedev & Bezděk, 2002
- Chlorolochmaea Bechyné & Bechyné, 1969
- Chorina Baly, 1866
- Chosnia Berti, 1990
- Chthoneis Baly, 1864
- Chujoa Gressitt & Kimoto, 1963
- Clerotilia Jacoby, 1885
- Clitena Baly, 1864
- Clitenella Laboissière, 1927
- Clitenososia Laboissière, 1931
- Cneorane Baly, 1865
- Cneoranidea Chen, 1942
- Cneorella Medvedev & Dang, 1981
- Cochabamba Bechyné, 1955
- Coeligetes Jacoby, 1884
- Coeligetoides Bezděk, 2016
- Coelocrania Jacoby, 1886
- Coelomera Chevrolat, 1836
- Conchocera Laboissière, 1922
- Coraia Clark, 1865
- Cornubrotica Bechyné & Bechyné, 1970
- Cornuventer Viswajyothi & Clark, 2022
- Coronabrotica Moura, 2010
- Crampelia Laboissière, 1922
- Craniotectus Laboissière, 1932
- Cyclantipha Laboissière, 1932
- Cyclotrypema Blake, 1966
- Cydippa Chapuis, 1875
- Cynortella Duvivier, 1891
- Cynortina Weise, 1905

== D ==
- Decarthrocera Laboissière, 1937
- Deinocladus Blake, 1966
- Dercetina Gressitt & Kimoto, 1963
- Dercetisoma Maulik, 1936
- Derospidea Blake, 1931
- Desbordelepta Nguyen & Gómez-Zurita, 2017 (formerly Desbordesius Laboissière, 1933)
- Diabrotica Chevrolat, 1836
- Diacantha Chevrolat, 1836
- Dicoelotrachelus Blake, 1941
- Dilinosa Weise, 1906
- Dimalianella Laboissière, 1940
- Diorhabda Weise, 1883
- Dircema Clark, 1865
- Dircemella Weise, 1902
- Doeberllepta Wagner, 2017
- Doryida Baly, 1865
- Doryidella Laboissière, 1940
- Doryidomorpha Laboissière, 1931
- Doryscus Jacoby, 1887
- Doryxena Baly, 1861
- Doryxenoides Laboissière, 1927
- Drasa Bryant, 1941
- Dreeus Shute, 1983
- Duvivieria Weise, 1903
- Dyolania Laboissière, 1931
- Dyserythra Weise, 1902
- Dysiodes Weise, 1908

== E ==
- Eccoptopsis Blake, 1966
- Ectmesopus Blake, 1940
- Eleona Fairmaire, 1902
- Ellopidia Hincks, 1949
- Elyces Jacoby, 1888
- Emathea Baly, 1865
- Ensiforma Jacoby, 1876
- Epaenidea Gressitt & Kimoto, 1963
- Epiluperodes Gressitt & Kimoto, 1963
- Erganoides Jacoby, 1903
- Erynephala Blake, 1936
- Erythrobapta Weise, 1902
- Estcourtiana Jacoby, 1900
- Eubeiratia Laboissière, 1931
- Eucerotoma Laboissière, 1939
- Eugaleruca Laboissière, 1922
- Euliroetis Ogloblin, 1936
- Euluperus Weise, 1886
- Eumelepta Jacoby, 1892
- Eupachytoma Laboissière, 1940
- Eurycycla Jacoby, 1903
- Eusattodera Schaeffer, 1906
- Eustena Baly, 1879
- Exora Chevrolat, 1836
- Exosoma Jacoby, 1903
- Exosomella Laboissière, 1932
- Exosomorpha Laboissière, 1932

== F ==
- Falsoexosoma Pic, 1926
- Fleutiauxia Laboissière, 1933
- Furusawaia Chûjô, 1962 (= Yunnaniata Lopatin, 2009)

== G ==
- Galenaria Medvedev, 2007
- Galerosastra Laboissière, 1929
- Galerotella Maulik, 1936
- Galeruca Geoffroy, 1762 (including Rhabdotilla Jacobson, 1911)
- Galerucella Crotch, 1873
- Galerudolphia Hincks, 1949
- Galerumaea Hincks, 1949
- Galerusoma Jacoby, 1892
- Gallerucida Motschulsky, 1861
- Gastrida Chapuis, 1879
- Geethaluperus Viswajyothi & Clark, 2022
- Geinella Strand, 1935
- Geinula Ogloblin, 1936
- Glaucorhabda Weise, 1910
- Gonaives Clark, 1987
- Goudotina Weise, 1910
- Gronovius Jacoby, 1905
- Gynandrobrotica Bechyné, 1955

== H ==
- Haemodoryida Chen, 1942
- Halinella Bechyné, 1956
- Hallirhotius Jacoby, 1888
- Halticopsis Fairmaire, 1883
- Halysacantha Laboissière, 1922
- Hamushia Chûjô, 1956
- Haplosomoides Duvivier, 1890
- Haplotia Jacoby, 1887
- Hatita Fairmaire, 1891
- Hecataeus Jacoby, 1888
- Hemiphracta Weise, 1902
- Hemistus Jacoby, 1886
- Hemygascelis Jacoby, 1896
- Hesperomorpha Ogloblin, 1936
- Hesperopenna Medvedev & Dang, 1981
- Heterochele Viswajyothi & Clark, 2021
- Hildebrandtianella Laboissière, 1932
- Himaplosonyx Chen, 1976
- Hirtigaleruca Chûjô, 1962
- Hirtomimastra Medvedev, 2009
- Hoplasoma Jacoby, 1884
- Hoplosaenidea Laboissière, 1933
- Hoplostines Blackburn, 1890
- Hovaliana Laboissière, 1932
- Huillania Laboissière, 1921
- Hylaspoides Duvivier, 1892
- Hymenesia Clark, 1865
- Hyperbrotica Bechyné & Bechyné, 1968
- Hyphaenia Baly, 1865
- Hystiopsis Blake, 1966

== I ==
- Ikopista Fairmaire, 1901
- Impensa Wilcox, 1971
- Inbioluperus Clark, 1993
- Interbrotica Bechyné & Bechyné, 1965
- Isotes Weise, 1922
- Itaitubana Bechyné, 1963
- Itylus Jacoby, 1904
- Iucetima Moura, 1998

== J ==
- Jacobya Weise, 1901
- Jacobyanella Laboissière, 1924
- Japonitata Strand, 1935
- Jolibrotica Lee & Bezděk, 2015

== K ==
- Kanahiiphaga Laboissière, 1931
- Kanarella Jacoby, 1896
- Keitheatus Wilcox, 1965
- Khasia Jacoby, 1899
- Konbirella Duvivier, 1892
- Kumbalia Mohamedsaid & Takizawa, 2007
- Kumbornia Mohamedsaid, 2006

== L ==
- Laetana Baly, 1864
- Laetiacantha Laboissière, 1921
- Lamprocopa Hincks, 1949
- Lanolepta Kimoto, 1991
- Laosixantha Kimoto, 1989
- Laphris Baly, 1864
- Leptarthra Baly, 1861
- Leptarthroides Beenen, 2009
- Leptaulaca Weise, 1902
- Leptomona Bechyné, 1958
- Leptonesiotes Blake, 1958
- Leptoxena Baly, 1888
- Lesnella Laboissière, 1932
- Lilophaea Bechyné, 1958
- Liroetina Medvedev, 2013
- Liroetis Weise, 1889 (= Siemssenius Weise, 1922 = Zangia Chen, 1976)
- Liroetoides Kimoto, 1989
- Lochmaea Weise, 1883
- Lomirana Laboissière, 1932
- Luisiadia Medvedev, 1979
- Luperacantha Laboissière, 1932
- Luperocella Jacoby, 1900
- Luperocida Medvedev & Dang, 1981
- Luperodes Motschulsky, 1858
- Luperogala Medvedev & Samoderzhenkov, 1989
- Luperolophus Fairmaire, 1876
- Luperosoma Jacoby, 1891
- Luperososia Laboissière, 1935
- Luperus Geoffroy, 1762
- Lusingania Laboissière, 1919
- Lygistus Wilcox, 1965

== M ==
- Macrima Baly, 1878
- Madurasia Jacoby, 1896
- Maevatanania Bechyné, 1964
- Mahutia Laboissière, 1917
- Malaconida Fairmaire, 1886
- Malacorhinus Jacoby, 1887
- Malacotheria Fairmaire, 1881
- Marmina Shute, 1983
- Marseulia Joannis, 1865
- Masurius Jacoby, 1888
- Medythia Jacoby, 1887
- Megaleruca Laboissière, 1922
- Megalognatha Baly, 1878
- Megarhabda Viswajyothi & Clark, 2022
- Mellesia Weise, 1902
- Menippus Clark, 1864
- Meristata Strand, 1935
- Meristoides Laboissière, 1929
- Metacoryna Jacoby, 1888
- Metacycla Baly, 1861
- Metalepta Baly, 1861
- Metopoedema Duvivier, 1891
- Metrioidea Fairmaire, 1881
- Metrobrotica Bechyné, 1958
- Metrogaleruca Bechyné & Bechyné, 1969
- Mexiluperus Viswajyothi & Clark, 2022
- Microbrotica Jacoby, 1887
- Microexosoma Laboissière, 1931
- Microlepta Jacoby, 1886
- Microscelida Clark, 1998
- Miltina Chapuis, 1875 (= Liroegala Medvedev, 2015)
- Mimagitocera Maulik, 1936
- Mimastra Baly, 1865 (= Neoatysa Abdullah & Qureshi, 1968)
- Mimastracella Jacoby, 1903
- Mimastroides Jacoby, 1892
- Mimastrosoma Medvedev, 2004
- Mindana Allard, 1889
- Mindella Medvedev, 1995
- Mindorina Laboissière, 1940
- Miraces Jacoby, 1888
- Momaea Baly, 1865
- Mombasa Fairmaire, 1884
- Monardia Laboissière, 1939
- Monoaster Viswajyothi & Clark, 2022
- Monocesta Clark, 1865
- Monocestoides Duvivier, 1891
- Monocida Jacoby, 1899
- Monolepta Chevrolat, 1836
- Monoleptinia Laboissière, 1932
- Monoleptocrania Laboissière, 1940
- Monoleptoides Wagner, 2011
- Monoxia LeConte, 1865
- Morokasia Jacoby, 1904
- Morphosphaera Baly, 1861
- Morphosphaeroides Jacoby, 1903
- Munina Chen, 1976

== N ==
- Nadrana Baly, 1865
- Nancita Allard, 1889
- Narichona Kirsch, 1883
- Neobarombiella Bolz & Wagner, 2012
- Neobrotica Jacoby, 1887
- Neochya Lee, 2020
- Neodrana Jacoby, 1886
- Neolepta Jacoby, 1884
- Neolochmaea Laboissière, 1939
- Neomahutia Laboissière, 1936
- Neophaestus Hincks, 1949
- Neorupilia Blackburn, 1888
- Nepalogaleruca Kimoto, 1970
- Nepalolepta Medvedev, 1992
- Nestinus Clark, 1865
- Niasia Jacoby, 1889
- Nirina Weise, 1892
- Nirinoides Jacoby, 1903
- Notonicea Hincks, 1949
- Nototrichaspis Hincks, 1949
- Nyctidromas Semenov, 1896
- Nyctiplanctus Blake, 1963
- Nymphius Weise, 1900

== O ==
- Oides Weber, 1801
- Oidomorpha Laboissière, 1924
- Oorlogia Silfverberg, 1978
- Oosagitta Kortenhaus & Wagner, 2013
- Ootheca Dejean, 1836
- Oothecoides Kortenhaus & Wagner, 2011
- Ootibia Kortenhaus & Wagner, 2012
- Ophraea Jacoby, 1886
- Ophraella Wilcox, 1965
- Ornithognathus Thomson, 1858
- Oroetes Jacoby, 1888
- Orthoneolepta Hazmi & Wagner, 2013
- Orthoxia Clark, 1865
- Orthoxioides Laboissière, 1922

== P ==
- Pachytomellina Hincks, 1949
- Palaeophylia Jacoby, 1903
- Palaeosastra Jacoby, 1906
- Paleosepharia Laboissière, 1936
- Pallasiola Jacobson, 1925
- Palmaria Bechyné, 1956
- Palpaenidea Laboissière, 1933
- Palpoxena Baly, 1861
- Panafrolepta Mertgen & Wagner, 2006
- Papuania Jacoby, 1906
- Parabrotica Bechyné & Bechyné, 1961
- Paraclitena Medvedev, 1972
- Parageina Laboissière, 1936
- Paragetocera Laboissière, 1929
- Paranapiacaba Bechyné, 1958
- Paraneolepta Hazmi & Wagner, 2013
- Paranoides Vachon, 1976
- Parantongila Laboissière, 1932
- Paraplotes Laboissière, 1933 (= Shensia Chen, 1964)
- Parapophylia Laboissière, 1922
- Parasbecesta Laboissière, 1940
- Paraspitiella Chen & Jiang, 1981
- Parastetha Baly, 1879
- Paratriarius Schaeffer, 1906
- Paraxenoda Mohamedsaid, 1999
- Parexosoma Laboissière, 1932
- Paridea Baly, 1886 (= Neosastra Abdullah & Qureshi, 1968)
- Paumomua Jacoby, 1904
- Periclitena Weise, 1902
- Philastra Medvedev, 1995
- Phyllecthris Dejean, 1836
- Phyllobrotica Chevrolat, 1836
- Phyllobroticella Jacoby, 1894
- Phyllocleptis Weise, 1913
- Pimentelia Laboissière, 1932
- Plagiasma Weise, 1903
- Platybrotica Cabrera & Cabrera Walsh, 2004
- Platycesta Viswajyothi & Clark, 2021
- Platymorpha Jacoby, 1888
- Platynocera Blanchard, 1846
- Pleronexis Weise, 1908
- Polexima Weise, 1903
- Polysastra Shute, 1983
- Poneridia Weise, 1908
- Porechontes Blake, 1966
- Porphytoma Jacoby, 1903
- Potamobrotica Blake, 1966
- Prasyptera Baly, 1878
- Prathapanius Viswajyothi & Clark, 2020
- Priapina Jacoby, 1887
- Proegmena Weise, 1889
- Prosmidia Weise, 1901
- Protocoelocrania Laboissière, 1931
- Protoleptonyx Laboissière, 1932
- Pseudadimonia Duvivier, 1891
- Pseudaenidea Laboissière, 1938
- Pseudaplosonyx Duvivier, 1884
- Pseudapophylia Jacoby, 1903
- Pseudespera Chen, Wang & Jiang, 1985
- Pseudeustetha Jacoby, 1899
- Pseudikopista Laboissière, 1932
- Pseudocneorane Medvedev & Romantsov, 2012
- Pseudocophora Jacoby, 1884
- Pseudodiabrotica Jacoby, 1892
- Pseudoides Jacoby, 1892
- Pseudolognatha Jacoby, 1903
- Pseudoluperus Beller & Hatch, 1932
- Pseudomalaxia Laboissière, 1926
- Pseudorupilia Jacoby, 1893
- Pseudosastra Jacoby, 1904
- Pseudoscelida Jacoby, 1894
- Pseudosepharia Laboissière, 1936
- Pseudoshaira Beenen, 2007
- Pseudotheopea Lee & Bezděk, 2020
- Pteleon Jacoby, 1888
- Pterophthinus Gressitt & Kimoto, 1963
- Pubibrotica Medvedev, 2002
- Pyesexora Viswajyothi & Clark, 2022
- Pyesia Clark, 1865
- Pyrrhalta Joannis, 1865

== R ==
- Rachicephala Blake, 1966
- Radymna Reitter, 1913 (= Farsogaleruca Lopatin, 1981)
- Rohania Laboissière, 1921
- Romanita Bechyné, 1958
- Rubrarcastes Hazmi & Wagner, 2010
- Rupilia Clark, 1864
- Ruwenzoria Laboissière, 1919

== S ==
- Sakaramya Bechyné, 1952
- Salaminia Heller, 1898
- Samoria Silfverberg, 1982
- Sarawakiola Mohamedsaid, 1997
- Sardoides Jacoby, 1895
- Sastra Baly, 1865
- Sastracella Jacoby, 1899
- Sastroides Jacoby, 1884
- Scelida Chapuis, 1875
- Scelidacne Clark, 1998
- Scelolyperus Crotch, 1874
- Schematiza Chevrolat, 1836
- Schematizella Jacoby, 1888
- Scruptoluperus Laboissière, 1925
- Sermylassa Reitter, 1913
- Sermyloides Jacoby, 1884
- Sesselia Laboissière, 1931
- Shaira Maulik, 1936
- Shairella Chûjô, 1962
- Shairoidea Beenen, 2013
- Shamshera Maulik, 1936
- Shungwayana Silfverberg, 1975
- Sikkimia Duvivier, 1891
- Simopsis Blake, 1966
- Sinoluperoides Kimoto, 1989
- Sinoluperus Gressitt & Kimoto, 1963
- Socorroita Bechyné, 1956
- Sonchia Weise, 1901
- Sonyadora Bechyné, 1958
- Sosibiella Jacoby, 1896
- Sphenoraia Clark, 1865
- Sphenorella Medvedev & Sprecher-Uebersax, 1998
- Spilocephalus Jacoby, 1888
- Spilonotella Cockerell, 1905
- Spitiella Laboissière, 1931
- Stenellina Cockerell, 1905
- Stenoplatys Baly, 1861
- Stictocema Jacoby, 1906
- Striganovia Medvedev, 2002
- Strobiderus Jacoby, 1884
- Strumatea Baly, 1886
- Sumatrasia Jacoby, 1884
- Synetocephalus Fall, 1910
- Synodita Chapuis, 1875
- Syphaxia Baly, 1866

== T ==
- Taenala Silfverberg, 1978
- Taiwanaenidea Kimoto, 1984
- Taiwanoshaira Lee & Beenen, 2020
- Taphina Duvivier, 1885
- Tarachodia Weise, 1902
- Taumacera Thunberg, 1814 (= Acroxena Baly, 1879 = Kinabalua Mohamedsaid, 1997 = Xenarthra Baly, 1861)
- Texiluperus Viswajyothi & Clark, 2022
- Theone Gistel, 1857
- Theopea Baly, 1864
- Theopella Laboissière, 1940
- Therpis Weise, 1900
- Trachyelytron Viswajyothi & Clark, 2022
- Trachyscelida Horn, 1893
- Triariodes Clark & Anderson, 2019
- Triarius Jacoby, 1887
- Trichobalya Weise, 1924
- Trichobrotica Bechyné, 1956
- Trichocneorane Laboissière, 1935
- Tricholochmaea Laboissière, 1932
- Trichomimastra Weise, 1922
- Trichosepharia Laboissière, 1936
- Trigonexora Bechyné & Bechyné, 1970
- Trirhabda LeConte, 1865
- Tschitscherinula Jacobson, 1908
- Tsouchya Lee, 2020

== U ==
- Uaupesia Bechyné, 1958

== V ==
- Vietoluperina Medvedev, 2015
- Vietoluperus Medvedev & Dang, 1981
- Vitruvia Jacoby, 1903

== W ==
- Witteochaloenus Laboissière, 1940

== X ==
- Xanthogaleruca Laboissière, 1934
- Xenarthracella Laboissière, 1940
- Xenoda Baly, 1877
- Xingeina Chen, Jiang & Wang, 1987

== Y ==
- Yingabruxia Viswajyothi & Clark, 2022
- Yingaresca Bechyné, 1956
- Yulenia Jacoby, 1886
- Yunaspes Chen, 1976

== Z ==
- Zangastra Chen & Jiang, 1981
- Zepherina Bechyné, 1958
- Zischkaita Bechyné, 1956
- Zizonia Chen, 1976

== See also ==
- List of flea beetle genera
