= Mombasa (disambiguation) =

Mombasa is a city on the coast of Kenya.

Mombasa may also refer to:

- Mombasa County, one of the 47 counties of Kenya
- Mombasa Island, a coral outcrop located on Kenya's coast
- Mombasa (beetle), a genus of insects in the family Chrysomelidae
- Mombasa (board game), a 2015 Euro-style game by Alexander Pfister
- "Mombasa" (song), a song by the Finnish singer Taiska
- 1428 Mombasa, an asteroid
- Mombasa, a fictional character in the sci-fi action film Predators
