= Bryantiella =

Bryantiella may refer to:

- Bryantiella (beetle), a genus of beetles in the family Chrysomelidae
- Bryantiella (plant), a genus of flowering plants in the family Polemoniaceae

== See also ==
- Bryantella (genus of spiders)
