= Momaea =

Scientific classification
- Kingdom: Animalia
- Phylum: Arthropoda
- Clade: Pancrustacea
- Class: Insecta
- Order: Coleoptera
- Suborder: Polyphaga
- Infraorder: Cucujiformia
- Family: Chrysomelidae
- Subfamily: Galerucinae
- Tribe: Galerucini
- Genus: Momaea; Baly, 1865

Genus of leaf beetles

Momaea is a genus of beetles belonging to the family Chrysomelidae.

== Species ==
- Momaea costatipennis Jacoby, 1894
- Momaea distincta Mohamedsaid, 1999
- Momaea eximia (Blackburn, 1896)
- Momaea flavomarginata Jacoby, 1886
- Momaea gracilis Duvivier, 1884
- Momaea rugipennis (Jacoby, 1893)
- Momaea viridipennis (Baly, 1865)
