= Nyctidromas =

Scientific classification
- Kingdom: Animalia
- Phylum: Arthropoda
- Clade: Pancrustacea
- Class: Insecta
- Order: Coleoptera
- Suborder: Polyphaga
- Infraorder: Cucujiformia
- Family: Chrysomelidae
- Subfamily: Galerucinae
- Tribe: Galerucini
- Genus: Nyctidromas; Semenov in Jacobson, 1896

Synonyms
- Nyctiphantus Semenov, 1902

Genus of leaf beetles

Nyctidromas is a genus of beetles belonging to the family Chrysomelidae.

== Species ==
- Nyctidromas bergi
- Nyctidromas bicoloripennis
- Nyctidromas custos
- Nyctidromas hirtus (Weise, 1885)
