= Geinella =

Scientific classification
- Kingdom: Animalia
- Phylum: Arthropoda
- Clade: Pancrustacea
- Class: Insecta
- Order: Coleoptera
- Suborder: Polyphaga
- Infraorder: Cucujiformia
- Family: Chrysomelidae
- Subfamily: Galerucinae
- Tribe: Galerucini
- Genus: Geinella; Strand, 1935

Synonyms
- Geina Jacobson, 1925 (preocc.); Geinella Strand, 1935; Swargia Maulik, 1936

Genus of leaf beetles

Geinella is a genus of beetles belonging to the family Chrysomelidae.

== Species ==
- Geinella crassicornis Chen, 1987
- Geinella cuprea Chen & Jiang, 1981
- Geinella intermedia Chen, 1987
- Geinella invenusta (Jacobson, 1925)
- Geinella krishna (Maulik, 1936)
- Geinella punctipennis Chen, 1987
- Geinella rugosa Chen, 1987
- Geinella splendida Chen, 1987
- Geinella tenuipes Chen & Jiang, 1981
- Geinella trapezicollis Warchalowski, 2001
