= Pleronexis =

Scientific classification
- Kingdom: Animalia
- Phylum: Arthropoda
- Clade: Pancrustacea
- Class: Insecta
- Order: Coleoptera
- Suborder: Polyphaga
- Infraorder: Cucujiformia
- Family: Chrysomelidae
- Subfamily: Galerucinae
- Tribe: Galerucini
- Genus: Pleronexis; Weise, 1908

Synonyms
- Plesistia Maulik, 1929

Genus of leaf beetles

Pleronexis is a genus of beetles belonging to the family Chrysomelidae.

== Species ==
- Pleronexis beauforti Weise, 1908
- Pleronexis caledonica (Fauvel, 1878)
- Pleronexis sahulensis
