= Normaltica =

Scientific classification
- Kingdom: Animalia
- Phylum: Arthropoda
- Clade: Pancrustacea
- Class: Insecta
- Order: Coleoptera
- Suborder: Polyphaga
- Infraorder: Cucujiformia
- Family: Chrysomelidae
- Subfamily: Galerucinae
- Tribe: Alticini
- Genus: Normaltica; Konstantinov, 2002

Type species
- Normaltica obrieni Konstantinov, 2002

Species
- Normaltica iviei Normaltica obrieni

Genus of beetles

Normaltica is a genus of flea beetles found in the Greater Antilles. The genus was first described in 2002 by Alexander S. Konstantinov, who also described the two known species in the genus: Normaltica obrieni from Puerto Rico, and Normaltica iviei from the Dominican Republic. They are distinctive for their clavate antennae (having one end thicker than the other, like a club), not found in other known New World flea beetles. N. obrieni is sexually dimorphic in that the males have wider heads with enlarged labrum and mandibles; in N. iviei, the males and females are not significantly different externally. The wings of N. obrieni are fully formed, while those of N. iviei are significantly reduced: they are full in length, but are very narrow. The genus is named after entomologist Norman E. Woodley, who collected specimens of N. obrieni, which is designated as the type species of the genus.
