= Hemiphracta =

Scientific classification
- Kingdom: Animalia
- Phylum: Arthropoda
- Clade: Pancrustacea
- Class: Insecta
- Order: Coleoptera
- Suborder: Polyphaga
- Infraorder: Cucujiformia
- Family: Chrysomelidae
- Subfamily: Galerucinae
- Tribe: Galerucini
- Genus: Hemiphracta; Weise, 1902

Genus of leaf beetles

Hemiphracta is a genus of beetles belonging to the family Chrysomelidae.

== Species ==
- Hemiphracta clavicornis (Karsch, 1881)
- Hemiphracta lurida (Allard, 1890)
