= Galerotella =

Scientific classification
- Kingdom: Animalia
- Phylum: Arthropoda
- Clade: Pancrustacea
- Class: Insecta
- Order: Coleoptera
- Suborder: Polyphaga
- Infraorder: Cucujiformia
- Family: Chrysomelidae
- Subfamily: Galerucinae
- Tribe: Galerucini
- Genus: Galerotella; Maulik, 1936

Genus of leaf beetles

Galerotella is a genus of beetles belonging to the family Chrysomelidae.

== Species ==
- Galerotella euryobotryae Maulik, 1936
- Galerotella garoana Maulik, 1936
- Galerotella indicola Takizawa, 1986
- Galerotella virida (Jacoby, 1887)
