= Notonicea =

Scientific classification
- Kingdom: Animalia
- Phylum: Arthropoda
- Clade: Pancrustacea
- Class: Insecta
- Order: Coleoptera
- Suborder: Polyphaga
- Infraorder: Cucujiformia
- Family: Chrysomelidae
- Subfamily: Galerucinae
- Tribe: Galerucini
- Genus: Notonicea; Hincks, 1949

Genus of leaf beetles

Notonicea is a genus of beetles belonging to the family Chrysomelidae.

== Species ==
- Notonicea basalis (Jacoby, 1886)
- Notonicea bella (Baly, 1865)
- Notonicea bennigseni (Weise, 1903)
- Notonicea dimidiatipennis (Baly, 1865)
- Notonicea diversipes (Weise, 1903)
- Notonicea imperialis (Baly, 1865)
- Notonicea pulchella (Baly, 1886)
