= Hoplostines =

Scientific classification
- Kingdom: Animalia
- Phylum: Arthropoda
- Clade: Pancrustacea
- Class: Insecta
- Order: Coleoptera
- Suborder: Polyphaga
- Infraorder: Cucujiformia
- Family: Chrysomelidae
- Subfamily: Galerucinae
- Tribe: Galerucini
- Genus: Hoplostines; Blackburn, 1890

Genus of leaf beetles

Hoplostines is a genus of beetles belonging to the family Chrysomelidae.

== Species ==
- Hoplostines elegans (Blackburn, 1890)
- Hoplostines laporteae (Weise, 1923)
- Hoplostines mastersi (Blackburn, 1896)
