= Clitena =

Scientific classification
- Kingdom: Animalia
- Phylum: Arthropoda
- Clade: Pancrustacea
- Class: Insecta
- Order: Coleoptera
- Suborder: Polyphaga
- Infraorder: Cucujiformia
- Family: Chrysomelidae
- Subfamily: Galerucinae
- Tribe: Galerucini
- Genus: Clitena; Baly, 1864

Synonyms
- Mesodonta Baly, 1865

Genus of leaf beetles

Clitena is a genus of beetles belonging to the family Chrysomelidae.

== Species ==
- Clitena limbata Baly, 1864
- Clitena maculipennis (Chen, 1942)
