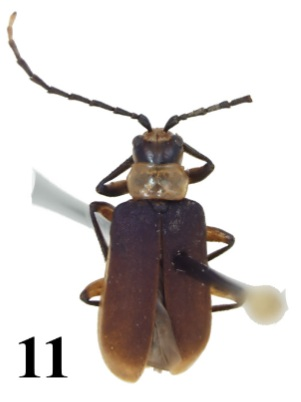

Scientific classification
- Kingdom: Animalia
- Phylum: Arthropoda
- Clade: Pancrustacea
- Class: Insecta
- Order: Coleoptera
- Suborder: Polyphaga
- Infraorder: Cucujiformia
- Family: Chrysomelidae
- Genus: Neophaestus
- Species: N. chiriquensis

Binomial name
- Neophaestus chiriquensis (Jacoby, 1887)

Synonyms
- Phaestus chiriquensis Jacoby, 1887

= Neophaestus chiriquensis =

Species of beetle

Neophaestus chiriquensis is a species of beetle of the family Chrysomelidae. It is found in Panama.
