= Conchocera =

Scientific classification
- Kingdom: Animalia
- Phylum: Arthropoda
- Clade: Pancrustacea
- Class: Insecta
- Order: Coleoptera
- Suborder: Polyphaga
- Infraorder: Cucujiformia
- Family: Chrysomelidae
- Subfamily: Galerucinae
- Tribe: Galerucini
- Genus: Conchocera; Laboissière, 1922

Genus of leaf beetles

Conchocera is a genus of beetles belonging to the family Chrysomelidae.

== Species ==
- Conchocera heterocera (Gestro, 1895)
