= Decarthrocera =

Scientific classification
- Kingdom: Animalia
- Phylum: Arthropoda
- Class: Insecta
- Order: Coleoptera
- Suborder: Polyphaga
- Infraorder: Cucujiformia
- Family: Chrysomelidae
- Subfamily: Galerucinae
- Tribe: Decarthrocerini
- Genus: Decarthrocera; Laboissière, 1937

Genus of leaf beetles

Decarthrocera is a genus of beetles belonging to the family Chrysomelidae.

== Species ==
- Decarthrocera viberti Laboissière, 1937
