= Geinula =

Scientific classification
- Kingdom: Animalia
- Phylum: Arthropoda
- Clade: Pancrustacea
- Class: Insecta
- Order: Coleoptera
- Suborder: Polyphaga
- Infraorder: Cucujiformia
- Family: Chrysomelidae
- Subfamily: Galerucinae
- Tribe: Galerucini
- Genus: Geinula; Ogloblin, 1936

Genus of leaf beetles

Geinula is a genus of beetles belonging to the family Chrysomelidae.

== Species ==
- Geinula antennata (Chen, 1961)
- Geinula coeruleipennis Chen, 1987
- Geinula jacobsoni (Ogloblin, 1936)
- Geinula longipilosa Chen, 1987
- Geinula nigra (Gressitt & Kimoto, 1963)
- Geinula rugipennis Chen, 1987
- Geinula similis Chen, 1987
- Geinula trifoveolata Chen, 1987
