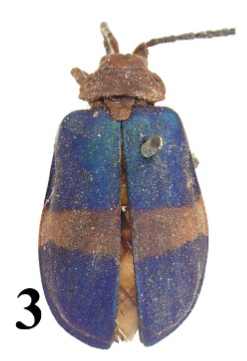

Scientific classification
- Kingdom: Animalia
- Phylum: Arthropoda
- Clade: Pancrustacea
- Class: Insecta
- Order: Coleoptera
- Suborder: Polyphaga
- Infraorder: Cucujiformia
- Family: Chrysomelidae
- Subfamily: Galerucinae
- Tribe: Galerucini
- Genus: Austrochorina; Bechyné, 1963
- Species: Austrochorina

Binomial name
- Austrochorina (Clark, 1865)

Synonyms
- Monocesta consularis Clark, 1865

= Austrochorina =

Genus of leaf beetles

Austrochorina is a genus of leaf beetles belonging to the family Chrysomelidae. It contains one described species, Austrochorina consularis, which is found in Brazil.
