= Pachytomellina =

Scientific classification
- Kingdom: Animalia
- Phylum: Arthropoda
- Clade: Pancrustacea
- Class: Insecta
- Order: Coleoptera
- Suborder: Polyphaga
- Infraorder: Cucujiformia
- Family: Chrysomelidae
- Subfamily: Galerucinae
- Tribe: Galerucini
- Genus: Pachytomellina; Hincks, 1949

Genus of leaf beetles

Pachytomellina is a genus of beetles belonging to the family Chrysomelidae.

== Species ==
- Pachytomellina bimaculata Laboissiere, 1924
- Pachytomellina cincta Laboissiere, 1940
- Pachytomellina elisabethae (Laboissiere, 1922)
- Pachytomellina ruficeps (Weise, 1906)
