= Orthoxia =

Scientific classification
- Kingdom: Animalia
- Phylum: Arthropoda
- Clade: Pancrustacea
- Class: Insecta
- Order: Coleoptera
- Suborder: Polyphaga
- Infraorder: Cucujiformia
- Family: Chrysomelidae
- Subfamily: Galerucinae
- Tribe: Galerucini
- Genus: Orthoxia; Clark, 1865

Genus of leaf beetles

Orthoxia is a genus of beetles belonging to the family Chrysomelidae.

== Species ==
- Orthoxia boisduvali (Clark, 1865)
