= Doryxena =

Scientific classification
- Kingdom: Animalia
- Phylum: Arthropoda
- Clade: Pancrustacea
- Class: Insecta
- Order: Coleoptera
- Suborder: Polyphaga
- Infraorder: Cucujiformia
- Family: Chrysomelidae
- Subfamily: Galerucinae
- Tribe: Galerucini
- Genus: Doryxena; Baly, 1861

Genus of leaf beetles

Doryxena is a genus of beetles belonging to the family Chrysomelidae.

== Species ==
- Doryxena geniculata Baly, 1879
- Doryxena grossa (Hope, 1831)
- Doryxena minor Kimoto, 2004
- Doryxena siva Maulik, 1936
