= Galerucini =

- Galeruca tanaceti

Scientific classification
- Kingdom: Animalia
- Phylum: Arthropoda
- Clade: Pancrustacea
- Class: Insecta
- Order: Coleoptera
- Suborder: Polyphaga
- Infraorder: Cucujiformia
- Family: Chrysomelidae
- Subfamily: Galerucinae
- Tribe: Galerucini; Latreille, 1802

Synonyms
- Galerucae Latreille, 1802; Galerucites Chapuis, 1875; Galerucini Leng, 1920; Galerucina Laboissière, 1934; Coelomerites Chapuis, 1875; Coelomerini Leng, 1920; Coelomerina Laboissière, 1934; Atysites Chapuis, 1875; Atysini Leng, 1920; Apophyliites Chapuis, 1875; Apophyliini Weise, 1923; Apophyliina Laboissière, 1934; Rupiliites Chapuis, 1875; Rupilinae Jacoby, 1899; Schematizites Chapuis, 1875; Mombasicites Laboissière, 1922; Chorini Weise, 1923; Chorinina Laboissière, 1934; Leptosonychini Weise, 1924; Theonina Laboissière, 1934

Tribe of beetles

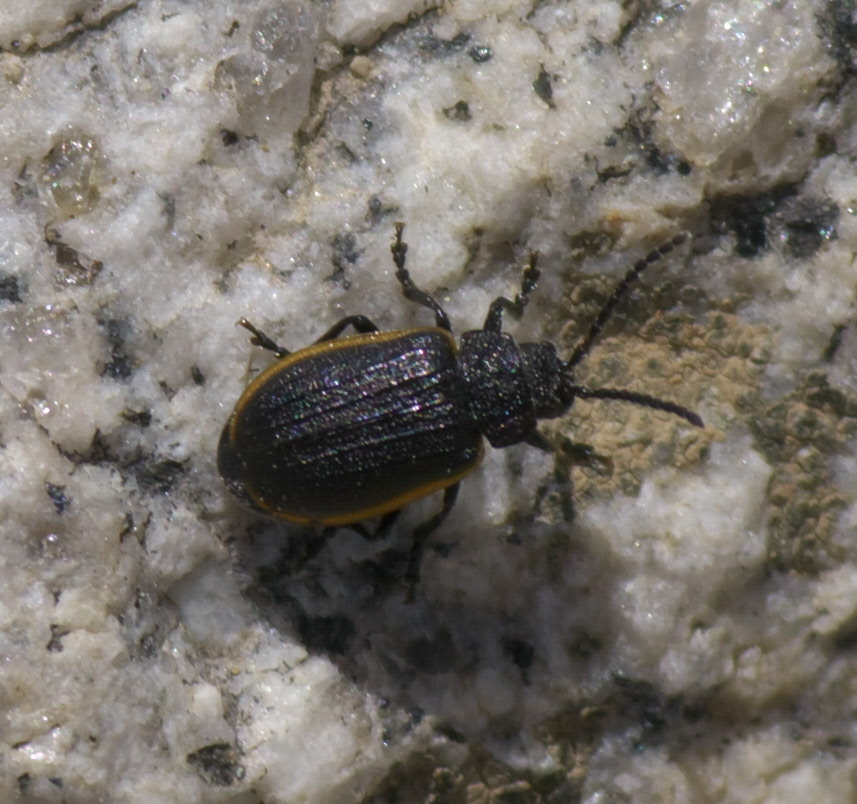
Galeruca, Colorado

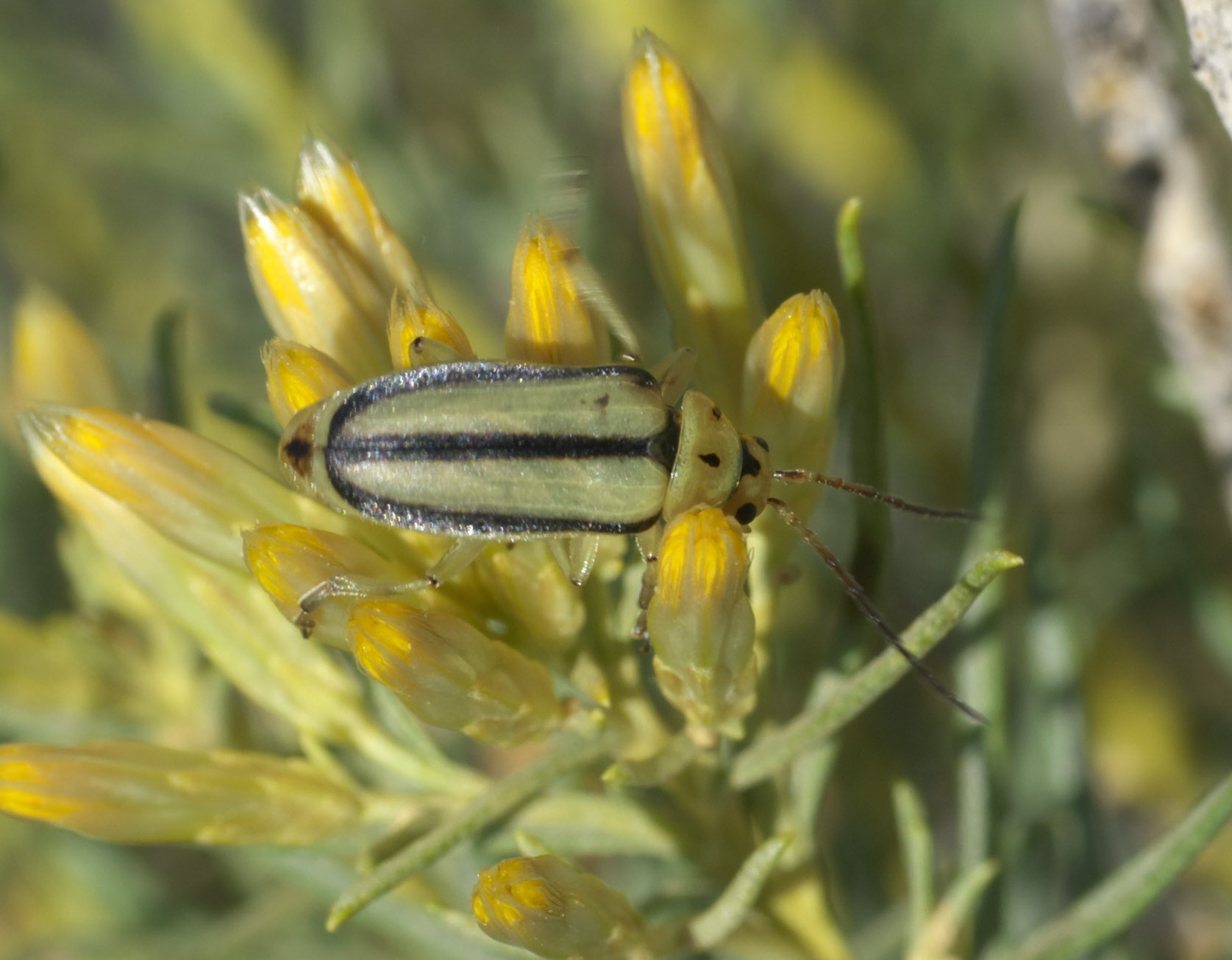
Trirhabda, Great Sand Dunes National Park

Galerucini is a tribe of skeletonizing leaf beetles in the family Chrysomelidae. There are more than 70 genera and at least 480 described species in Galerucini.

== Genera ==
These genera belong to the tribe Galerucini:

- Section Apophyliites:
  - Apophylia Chevrolat, 1836
  - Apterogaleruca Chûjô, 1962
  - Arima Chapuis, 1875
  - Belarima Reitter, 1913
  - Cydippa Chapuis, 1875
  - Geinella
  - Geinula
  - Hirtigaleruca Chûjô, 1962
  - Metalepta Baly, 1861
  - Nyctidromas
  - Parageina
  - Parapophylia Laboissière, 1922
  - Pseudadimonia Duvivier, 1891
  - Pseudapophylia Jacoby, 1903
  - Pterophthinus
  - Rupilia Clark, 1864
- Section Atysites:
  - Atysa Baly, 1864
  - Chujoa
  - Diorhabda Weise, 1883 (salt cedar beetles)
  - Eugaleruca
  - Galerosastra Laboissière, 1929
  - Galerotella
  - Galerucella Crotch, 1873 (water-lily beetles)
  - Hoplostines Blackburn, 1890
  - Lochmaea Weise, 1883
  - Luperocella Jacoby, 1900
  - Megaleruca Laboissière, 1922 (celtis leaf beetles)
  - Mimastracella Jacoby, 1903
  - Pyrrhalta Joannis, 1865
  - Radymna
  - Tarachodia
  - Tricholochmaea Laboissière, 1932
  - Xanthogaleruca Laboissière, 1934
- Section Coelomerites:
  - Alphidia
  - Anadimonia Ogloblin, 1936
  - Apteroyinga
  - Arimetus Jacoby, 1903
  - Austrochorina Bechyné, 1963
  - Brachyruca
  - Buphonida
  - Calaina Schaufuss, 1887
  - Caraguata Bechyné, 1954
  - Cerochroa Gerstaecker, 1855
  - Chorina Baly, 1866
  - Clitena Baly, 1864
  - Clitenella Laboissière, 1927
  - Clitenososia Laboissière, 1931
  - Coelomera Chevrolat, 1836
  - Conchocera
  - Coraia H. Clark, 1865
  - Derospidea Blake, 1931
  - Dicoelotrachelus Blake, 1941
  - Dircema Clark, 1865
  - Dircemella Weise, 1902
  - Doryxena
  - Doryxenoides Laboissière, 1927
  - Dreeus
  - Dyserythra
  - Dysiodes
  - Eupachytoma Laboissière, 1940
  - Galerumaea
  - Gonaives Clark, 1987
  - Gronovius
  - Hemiphracta Weise, 1902
  - Hovaliana
  - Hymenesia Clark, 1865
  - Itylus
  - Leptoxena
  - Malacotheria Fairmaire, 1881
  - Marmina
  - Megarhabda Viswajyothi & Clark, 2022
  - Menippus Clark, 1864
  - Miraces Jacoby, 1888 (miraces)
  - Momaea
  - Mombasa
  - Monocesta H. Clark, 1865
  - Monocestoides
  - Morokasia
  - Narichona
  - Neophaestus Hincks, 1949
  - Nestinus Clark, 1865
  - Nirina
  - Nirinoides
  - Notonicea
  - Nototrichaspis
  - Orthoxia
  - Orthoxioides
  - Pachytomellina
  - Paraclitena
  - Paumomua
  - Periclitena Weise, 1902
  - Platycesta Viswajyothi & Clark, 2021
  - Pleronexis Weise, 1908
  - Polysastra Shute, 1983
  - Poneridia Weise, 1908
  - Porphytoma Jacoby, 1903
  - Salaminia
  - Sastra
  - Sastracella Jacoby, 1900
  - Sastroides
  - Schematizella Jacoby, 1888
  - Socorroita Bechyné, 1956
  - Strumatea
  - Syphaxia Baly, 1866
  - Therpis
  - Trirhabda J. L. LeConte, 1865
  - Zangastra
- Section Galerucites:
  - Galeruca Geoffroy, 1762
  - Pallasiola Jacobson, 1925
  - Theone Gistel, 1857
- Section Schematizites:
  - Brucita Wilcox, 1965
  - Chlorolochmaea Bechyné & Springlová de Bechyné, 1969
  - Erynephala Blake, 1936
  - Itaitubana Bechyne, 1963
  - Iucetima Moura, 1998
  - Metrogaleruca Bechyné & Bechyné, 1969
  - Monoxia J. L. LeConte, 1865
  - Neolochmaea Laboissière, 1939
  - Ophraea Jacoby, 1886
  - Ophraella Wilcox, 1965
  - Platynocera Blanchard, 1846
  - Schematiza Chevrolat, 1836
  - Yingabruxia Viswajyothi & Clark, 2022
  - Yingaresca J.Bechyné, 1956
- Not assigned to a section/unknown:
  - Bryantiella
  - Pseudosastra
  - Pseudespera
