= Sastroides =

Scientific classification
- Kingdom: Animalia
- Phylum: Arthropoda
- Clade: Pancrustacea
- Class: Insecta
- Order: Coleoptera
- Suborder: Polyphaga
- Infraorder: Cucujiformia
- Family: Chrysomelidae
- Subfamily: Galerucinae
- Tribe: Galerucini
- Genus: Sastroides; Jacoby, 1884

Genus of leaf beetles

Sastroides is a genus of beetles belonging to the family Chrysomelidae.

== Species ==
- Sastroides apicalis Mohamedsaid, 1999
- Sastroides besucheti Medvedev, 2000
- Sastroides bicolor Mohamedsaid in Mohamed Said, Mohamed S, 1994
- Sastroides bimaculata (Jacoby, 1884)
- Sastroides birmanica Jacoby, 1889
- Sastroides crassipalpis (Jacoby, 1899)
- Sastroides fuscipennis (Jacoby, 1899)
- Sastroides indica Jacoby, 1894
- Sastroides livida (Laboissiere, 1935)
- Sastroides nigriceps Kimoto, 2004
- Sastroides pallidifulvus Kimoto, 1989
- Sastroides parvula Jacoby, 1892
- Sastroides rugicollis Kimoto, 2003
- Sastroides sabahensis Mohamedsaid in Mohamed Said, Mohamed S, 1994
- Sastroides tarsalis Mohamedsaid in Mohamed Said, Mohamed S, 1994
- Sastroides tibialis (Jacoby, 1900)
- Sastroides unik Mohamedsaid, 1999
