= Atysa =

Scientific classification
- Kingdom: Animalia
- Phylum: Arthropoda
- Clade: Pancrustacea
- Class: Insecta
- Order: Coleoptera
- Suborder: Polyphaga
- Infraorder: Cucujiformia
- Family: Chrysomelidae
- Subfamily: Galerucinae
- Tribe: Galerucini
- Genus: Atysa; Baly, 1864

Synonyms
- Triaplatarthris Fairmaire, 1878; Falsoplatyxantha Pic, 1927; Formosogalerucella Pic, 1928

Genus of leaf beetles

Atysa is a genus of beetles belonging to the family Chrysomelidae.

== Species ==
- Atysa affinis (Jacoby, 1894)
- Atysa albofasciata Jacoby, 1892
- Atysa aurantiaca (Pic, 1927)
- Atysa brevicornis (Samoderzhenkov, 1988)
- Atysa brevithorax (Pic, 1928)
- Atysa cinnamomi Chen, 1978
- Atysa collaris (Gressitt & Kimoto, 1966)
- Atysa dimidiatipennis (Jacoby, 1896)
- Atysa frontalis (Jacoby, 1896)
- Atysa fulvicornis (Baly, 1886)
- Atysa funesta Baly, 1886
- Atysa gigantica Maulik, 1936
- Atysa grandis Allard, 1889
- Atysa himalayana Medvedev, 2005
- Atysa imitans (Jacoby, 1896)
- Atysa jansoni Baly, 1886
- Atysa laotica Medvedev, 2005
- Atysa marginata (Gressitt & Kimoto, 1963)
- Atysa marginata Hope, 1831
- Atysa marginata Hope, 1831
- Atysa montivaga Maulik, 1936
- Atysa mureana (Maulik, 1936)
- Atysa nepalica Medvedev, 2005
- Atysa octocostata Medvedev, 2000
- Atysa porphyrea (Fairmaire, 1889)
- Atysa porphyrea (Fairmaire, 1889)
- Atysa pyrochroides (Fairmaire, 1878)
- Atysa sudiyana Maulik, 1936
- Atysa terminalis (Baly, 1864)
- Atysa thoracica Medvedev, 2005
