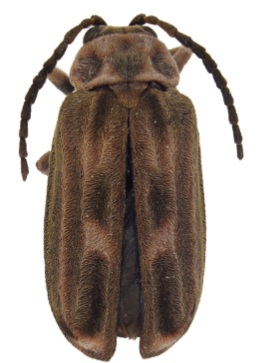

Scientific classification
- Kingdom: Animalia
- Phylum: Arthropoda
- Clade: Pancrustacea
- Class: Insecta
- Order: Coleoptera
- Suborder: Polyphaga
- Infraorder: Cucujiformia
- Family: Chrysomelidae
- Subfamily: Galerucinae
- Tribe: Galerucini
- Genus: Brucita; Wilcox, 1965
- Species: B. marmorata

Binomial name
- Brucita marmorata (Jacoby, 1886)

= Brucita =

Genus of beetles

Brucita is a genus of skeletonizing leaf beetles in the family Chrysomelidae. There is one described species in Brucita, B. marmorata. They are found in Texas and Guatemala.
