= Orthoxioides =

Scientific classification
- Kingdom: Animalia
- Phylum: Arthropoda
- Clade: Pancrustacea
- Class: Insecta
- Order: Coleoptera
- Suborder: Polyphaga
- Infraorder: Cucujiformia
- Family: Chrysomelidae
- Subfamily: Galerucinae
- Tribe: Galerucini
- Genus: Orthoxioides; Laboissière, 1922

Genus of leaf beetles

Orthoxioides is a genus of beetles belonging to the family Chrysomelidae.

== Species ==
- Orthoxioides ephippiata Dalman, 1823
- Orthoxioides epipleuralis Laboissiere, 1922
- Orthoxioides transversofasciata (Jacoby, 1883)
