= Nirina (beetle) =

Scientific classification
- Kingdom: Animalia
- Phylum: Arthropoda
- Clade: Pancrustacea
- Class: Insecta
- Order: Coleoptera
- Suborder: Polyphaga
- Infraorder: Cucujiformia
- Family: Chrysomelidae
- Subfamily: Galerucinae
- Tribe: Galerucini
- Genus: Nerina; Weise, 1892

Genus of leaf beetles

Nirina is a genus of beetles belonging to the family Chrysomelidae.

== Species ==
- Nirina flavofasciata Laboissiere, 1940
- Nirina imitans (Jacoby, 1894)
- Nirina jacobyi Weise, 1892
- Nirina regalis Laboissiere, 1940
