= Alphidia =

Scientific classification
- Kingdom: Animalia
- Phylum: Arthropoda
- Clade: Pancrustacea
- Class: Insecta
- Order: Coleoptera
- Suborder: Polyphaga
- Infraorder: Cucujiformia
- Family: Chrysomelidae
- Subfamily: Galerucinae
- Tribe: Galerucini
- Genus: Alphidia; Clark, 1865

Genus of leaf beetles

Alphidia is a genus of beetles belonging to the family Chrysomelidae.

== Species ==
- Alphidia comitata (Klug, 1833)
- Alphidia cupraria Bechyne, 1948
- Alphidia ifanidianae Bechyne, 1948
- Alphidia laeta Bechyne, 1948
- Alphidia magnifica Duvivier, 1891
- Alphidia nigricornis Fairmaire, 1902
- Alphidia purpurina Fairmaire, 1889
