= Itylus (beetle) =

Scientific classification
- Kingdom: Animalia
- Phylum: Arthropoda
- Clade: Pancrustacea
- Class: Insecta
- Order: Coleoptera
- Suborder: Polyphaga
- Infraorder: Cucujiformia
- Family: Chrysomelidae
- Subfamily: Galerucinae
- Tribe: Galerucini
- Genus: Itylus; Jacoby, 1904

Genus of leaf beetles

Itylus is a genus of beetles belonging to the family Chrysomelidae.

== Species ==
- Itylus bicolor (Jacoby, 1895)
- Itylus biru Mohamedsaid, 1995
- Itylus terminata Mohamedsaid, 1995
- Itylus testaceus Mohamedsaid, 1995
