= Cerochroa =

Scientific classification
- Kingdom: Animalia
- Phylum: Arthropoda
- Clade: Pancrustacea
- Class: Insecta
- Order: Coleoptera
- Suborder: Polyphaga
- Infraorder: Cucujiformia
- Family: Chrysomelidae
- Subfamily: Galerucinae
- Tribe: Galerucini
- Genus: Cerochroa; Gerstaecker, 1855

Genus of leaf beetles

Cerochroa is a genus of beetles belonging to the family Chrysomelidae.

== Species ==
- Cerochroa cincta Laboissiere, 1920
- Cerochroa femoralis Laboissiere, 1940
- Cerochroa ferruginea Laboissiere, 1920
- Cerochroa fulva Laboissiere, 1921
- Cerochroa inconspicua Jacoby, 1894
- Cerochroa maculicollis Baly, 1864
- Cerochroa nigricollis Laboissiere, 1920
- Cerochroa nigrilabris Laboissiere, 1922
- Cerochroa nigripennis Laboissiere, 1920
- Cerochroa ruficeps Gerstacker, 1855
