= Mimastracella =

Scientific classification
- Kingdom: Animalia
- Phylum: Arthropoda
- Clade: Pancrustacea
- Class: Insecta
- Order: Coleoptera
- Suborder: Polyphaga
- Infraorder: Cucujiformia
- Family: Chrysomelidae
- Subfamily: Galerucinae
- Tribe: Galerucini
- Genus: Mimastracella; Jacoby, 1903

Synonyms
- Eriosarda Jacoby, 1903

Genus of leaf beetles

Mimastracella is a genus of beetles belonging to the family Chrysomelidae.

== Species ==
- Mimastracella acuminata Samoderzhenkov, 1988
- Mimastracella antennalis Samoderzhenkov, 1988
- Mimastracella bicolor Kimoto, 1984
- Mimastracella brunnea (Gressitt & Kimoto, 1963)
- Mimastracella flavomarginata Takizawa, 1978
- Mimastracella hirsuta Jacoby, 1903
- Mimastracella lateralis (Chen, 1942)
- Mimastracella ochracea (Chen, 1942)
- Mimastracella palpalis Samoderzhenkov, 1988
- Mimastracella pubicollis Samoderzhenkov, 1988
- Mimastracella rostratus Samoderzhenkov, 1988
- Mimastracella submetallica (Gressitt & Kimoto, 1963)
- Mimastracella vietnamica Lopatin, 2002
- Mimastracella violacea (Weise, 1922)
- Mimastracella zaitzevi Samoderzhenkov, 1988
