= Dircemella =

Scientific classification
- Kingdom: Animalia
- Phylum: Arthropoda
- Clade: Pancrustacea
- Class: Insecta
- Order: Coleoptera
- Suborder: Polyphaga
- Infraorder: Cucujiformia
- Family: Chrysomelidae
- Subfamily: Galerucinae
- Tribe: Galerucini
- Genus: Dircemella; Weise, 1902

Genus of leaf beetles

Dircemella is a genus of beetles belonging to the family Chrysomelidae.

== Species ==
- Dircemella batesi (Jacoby, 1884)
- Dircemella dircemoides (Harold, 1879)
- Dircemella humeralis Laboissiere, 1930
- Dircemella marginata (Baly, 1879)
- Dircemella minuta Laboissiere, 1920
