= Schematizella =

Scientific classification
- Kingdom: Animalia
- Phylum: Arthropoda
- Clade: Pancrustacea
- Class: Insecta
- Order: Coleoptera
- Suborder: Polyphaga
- Infraorder: Cucujiformia
- Family: Chrysomelidae
- Subfamily: Galerucinae
- Tribe: Galerucini
- Genus: Schematizella; Jacoby, 1888

Genus of leaf beetles

Schematizella is a genus of beetles belonging to the family Chrysomelidae.

== Species ==
- Schematizella brevicornis Laboissiere, 1940
- Schematizella burgeoni Laboissiere, 1922
- Schematizella cameruna (Laboissiere, 1927)
- Schematizella castanea (Laboissiere, 1940)
- Schematizella erythrocephala (Laboissiere, 1920)
- Schematizella flava (Clark, 1865)
- Schematizella ghesquierei Laboissiere, 1940
- Schematizella marlieri Laboissiere, 1940
- Schematizella pulchella Laboissiere, 1940
- Schematizella puncticollis Laboissiere, 1940
- Schematizella smaragdina (Laboissiere, 1929)
- Schematizella tropica (Baly, 1879)
