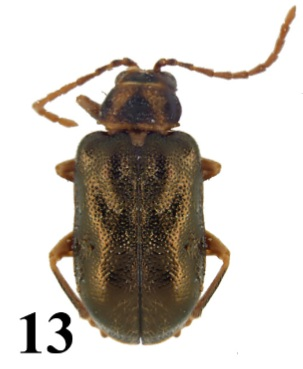
- Dicoelotrachelus species

Scientific classification
- Kingdom: Animalia
- Phylum: Arthropoda
- Clade: Pancrustacea
- Class: Insecta
- Order: Coleoptera
- Suborder: Polyphaga
- Infraorder: Cucujiformia
- Family: Chrysomelidae
- Subfamily: Galerucinae
- Tribe: Galerucini
- Genus: Dicoelotrachelus; Blake, 1941

= Dicoelotrachelus =

Genus of leaf beetles

Dicoelotrachelus is a genus of beetles belonging to the family Chrysomelidae.

== Geography ==
The genus occurs in Cuba and Hispaniola.

== Species ==
- Dicoelotrachelus brevicollis
- Dicoelotrachelus cubensis
- Dicoelotrachelus darlingtoni Blake, 1941
- Dicoelotrachelus depilatus
- Dicoelotrachelus sulcatus
