= Polysastra =

Scientific classification
- Kingdom: Animalia
- Phylum: Arthropoda
- Clade: Pancrustacea
- Class: Insecta
- Order: Coleoptera
- Suborder: Polyphaga
- Infraorder: Cucujiformia
- Family: Chrysomelidae
- Subfamily: Galerucinae
- Tribe: Galerucini
- Genus: Polysastra; Shute, 1983

Genus of leaf beetles

Polysastra is a genus of beetles belonging to the family Chrysomelidae.

== Species ==
- Polysastra confusa Shute, 1983
- Polysastra costatipennis (Jacoby, 1886)
- Polysastra duplicator Shute, 1983
- Polysastra explanata Shute, 1983
- Polysastra fuscitarsis Shute, 1983
- Polysastra inhabilis Shute, 1983
- Polysastra irregularis Shute, 1983
- Polysastra micropunctata Shute, 1983
- Polysastra montana Shute, 1983
- Polysastra purpurasco Shute, 1983
- Polysastra sedlaceki Shute, 1983
- Polysastra suavis Shute, 1983
- Polysastra varia Shute, 1983
- Polysastra venusta Shute, 1983
