= Pseudadimonia =

Scientific classification
- Kingdom: Animalia
- Phylum: Arthropoda
- Clade: Pancrustacea
- Class: Insecta
- Order: Coleoptera
- Suborder: Polyphaga
- Infraorder: Cucujiformia
- Family: Chrysomelidae
- Subfamily: Galerucinae
- Tribe: Galerucini
- Genus: Pseudadimonia; Duvivier, 1891

Genus of leaf beetles

Pseudadimonia is a genus of beetles belonging to the family Chrysomelidae.

== Species ==
- Pseudadimonia debris (Maulik, 1936)
- Pseudadimonia dilatata Jiang, 1991
- Pseudadimonia femoralis Jiang, 1991
- Pseudadimonia hirtipes Jiang, 1991
- Pseudadimonia holzschuhi Mandl, 1986
- Pseudadimonia medvedevi Samoderzhenkov, 1988
- Pseudadimonia microphthalma (Achard, 1922)
- Pseudadimonia parafemoralis Jiang, 1991
- Pseudadimonia pararugosa Jiang, 1991
- Pseudadimonia punctipennis Jiang, 1991
- Pseudadimonia rugosa (Laboissiere, 1927)
- Pseudadimonia variolosa (Hope, 1831)
- Pseudadimonia vietnamica Samoderzhenkov, 1988
