= Decarthrocerini =

Scientific classification
- Kingdom: Animalia
- Phylum: Arthropoda
- Class: Insecta
- Order: Coleoptera
- Suborder: Polyphaga
- Infraorder: Cucujiformia
- Family: Chrysomelidae
- Subfamily: Galerucinae
- Tribe: Decarthrocerini; Laboissière, 1937

Synonyms
- Decarthrocerina Laboissière, 1937

Tribe of beetles

Decarthrocerini is a tribe of beetles in the family Chrysomelidae.

== Genera ==
- Decarthrocera Laboissière, 1937
