= Clitenososia =

Scientific classification
- Kingdom: Animalia
- Phylum: Arthropoda
- Clade: Pancrustacea
- Class: Insecta
- Order: Coleoptera
- Suborder: Polyphaga
- Infraorder: Cucujiformia
- Family: Chrysomelidae
- Subfamily: Galerucinae
- Tribe: Galerucini
- Genus: Clitenososia; Laboissière, 1931

Genus of leaf beetles

Clitenososia is a genus of beetles belonging to the family Chrysomelidae.

== Species ==
- Clitenososia flava (Laboissiere, 1940)
- Clitenososia fulva (Laboissiere, 1922)
- Clitenososia maculicollis Laboissiere, 1931
