= Galerumaea =

Scientific classification
- Kingdom: Animalia
- Phylum: Arthropoda
- Clade: Pancrustacea
- Class: Insecta
- Order: Coleoptera
- Suborder: Polyphaga
- Infraorder: Cucujiformia
- Family: Chrysomelidae
- Subfamily: Galerucinae
- Tribe: Galerucini
- Genus: Galerumaea; Hincks, 1949

Genus of leaf beetles

Galerumaea is a genus of beetles belonging to the family Chrysomelidae.

== Species ==
- Galerumaea albofasciata (Baly, 1886)
- Galerumaea dimidiata (Guérin, 1844)
- Galerumaea fasciata (Baly, 1886)
- Galerumaea flavipennis (Baly, 1886)
- Galerumaea fulvicollis (Jacoby, 1894)
- Galerumaea interrupta (Jacoby, 1904)
- Galerumaea pulchra (Baly, 1865)
- Galerumaea viridiornata (Jacoby, 1894)
