= Malacotheria =

Scientific classification
- Kingdom: Animalia
- Phylum: Arthropoda
- Clade: Pancrustacea
- Class: Insecta
- Order: Coleoptera
- Suborder: Polyphaga
- Infraorder: Cucujiformia
- Family: Chrysomelidae
- Subfamily: Galerucinae
- Tribe: Galerucini
- Genus: Malacotheria; Fairmaire, 1881

Genus of leaf beetles

Malacotheria is a genus of beetles belonging to the family Chrysomelidae.

== Species ==
- Malacotheria fumerea Fairmaire, 1881
- Malacotheria joliveti Beenen, 2008
- Malacotheria lateritia Fairmaire, 1881
- Malacotheria picticollis (Fairmaire, 1883)
- Malacotheria strigiscuta Fairmaire, 1881
