= Zangastra =

Scientific classification
- Kingdom: Animalia
- Phylum: Arthropoda
- Clade: Pancrustacea
- Class: Insecta
- Order: Coleoptera
- Suborder: Polyphaga
- Infraorder: Cucujiformia
- Family: Chrysomelidae
- Subfamily: Galerucinae
- Tribe: Galerucini
- Genus: Zangastra; Chen & Jiang, 1981

Genus of leaf beetles

Zangastra is a genus of beetles belonging to the family Chrysomelidae.

== Species ==
- Zangastra angusta Jiang, 1988
- Zangastra nepalensis Takizawa, 1988
- Zangastra nitidicollis Chen & Jiang, 1981
- Zangastra pallidicollis Chen & Jiang, 1981
- Zangastra picea Jiang, 1988
- Zangastra sichuanica Lopatin, 2007
- Zangastra tuberosa Chen & Jiang, 1981
