= Periclitena =

Scientific classification
- Kingdom: Animalia
- Phylum: Arthropoda
- Clade: Pancrustacea
- Class: Insecta
- Order: Coleoptera
- Suborder: Polyphaga
- Infraorder: Cucujiformia
- Family: Chrysomelidae
- Subfamily: Galerucinae
- Tribe: Galerucini
- Genus: Periclitena; Weise, 1902

Genus of leaf beetles

Periclitena is a genus of beetles belonging to the family Chrysomelidae.

== Species ==
- Periclitena cyanea (Clark, 1865)
- Periclitena fulvicollis Samoderzhenkov, 1988
- Periclitena limbata Laboissiere, 1929
- Periclitena melancholica (Baly, 1864)
- Periclitena sinensis (Fairmaire, 1888)
- Periclitena vigorsi (Hope, 1831)
