= Sastra (beetle) =

Scientific classification
- Kingdom: Animalia
- Phylum: Arthropoda
- Clade: Pancrustacea
- Class: Insecta
- Order: Coleoptera
- Suborder: Polyphaga
- Infraorder: Cucujiformia
- Family: Chrysomelidae
- Subfamily: Galerucinae
- Tribe: Galerucini
- Genus: Sastra; Baly, 1865

Synonyms
- Eriosardella Chüjô, 1935

Genus of leaf beetles

Sastra is a genus of beetles belonging to the family Chrysomelidae.

== Species ==
- Sastra abdominalis Jacoby, 1904
- Sastra acutipennis Laboissiere, 1932
- Sastra apicicornis (Jacoby, 1899)
- Sastra basalis Jacoby, 1886
- Sastra beccarii Jacoby, 1886
- Sastra bicostata Jacoby, 1894
- Sastra ceylonensis (Jacoby, 1887)
- Sastra costata (Chujo, 1935)
- Sastra costatipennis Jacoby, 1886
- Sastra despressa Weise, 1917
- Sastra discoidalis Baly, 1886
- Sastra dohertyi Maulik, 1936
- Sastra elegans Weise, 1912
- Sastra fasciata Jacoby, 1886
- Sastra flavomarginata Jacoby, 1886
- Sastra fulvicornis Jacoby, 1892
- Sastra fulvomarginata Takizawa, 1988
- Sastra harmandi Laboissiere, 1932
- Sastra helleri Weise, 1917
- Sastra hitripennis Jacoby, 1891
- Sastra kampeni Weise, 1917
- Sastra laetabilis Weise, 1917
- Sastra lateralis (Jacoby, 1887)
- Sastra limbata Baly, 1865
- Sastra mamaya Maulik, 1936
- Sastra marginata (Jacoby, 1887)
- Sastra meijerei Weise, 1908
- Sastra metallescens Jacoby, 1894
- Sastra metallica Jacoby, 1886
- Sastra obscuricornis (Blackburn, 1896)
- Sastra olivacea (Jacoby, 1904)
- Sastra purpurascens (Hope, 1831)
- Sastra quadripustulata (Jacoby, 1904)
- Sastra rubya Maulik, 1936
- Sastra rugicollis (Jacoby, 1904)
- Sastra rugosa (Jacoby, 1886)
- Sastra rugulosa Weise, 1912
- Sastra suturalis Jacoby, 1886
- Sastra suturalis Medvedev, 2003
- Sastra viridipennis (Boisduval, 1835)
