= Arimetus =

Scientific classification
- Kingdom: Animalia
- Phylum: Arthropoda
- Clade: Pancrustacea
- Class: Insecta
- Order: Coleoptera
- Suborder: Polyphaga
- Infraorder: Cucujiformia
- Family: Chrysomelidae
- Subfamily: Galerucinae
- Tribe: Galerucini
- Genus: Arimetus; Jacoby, 1903

Genus of leaf beetles

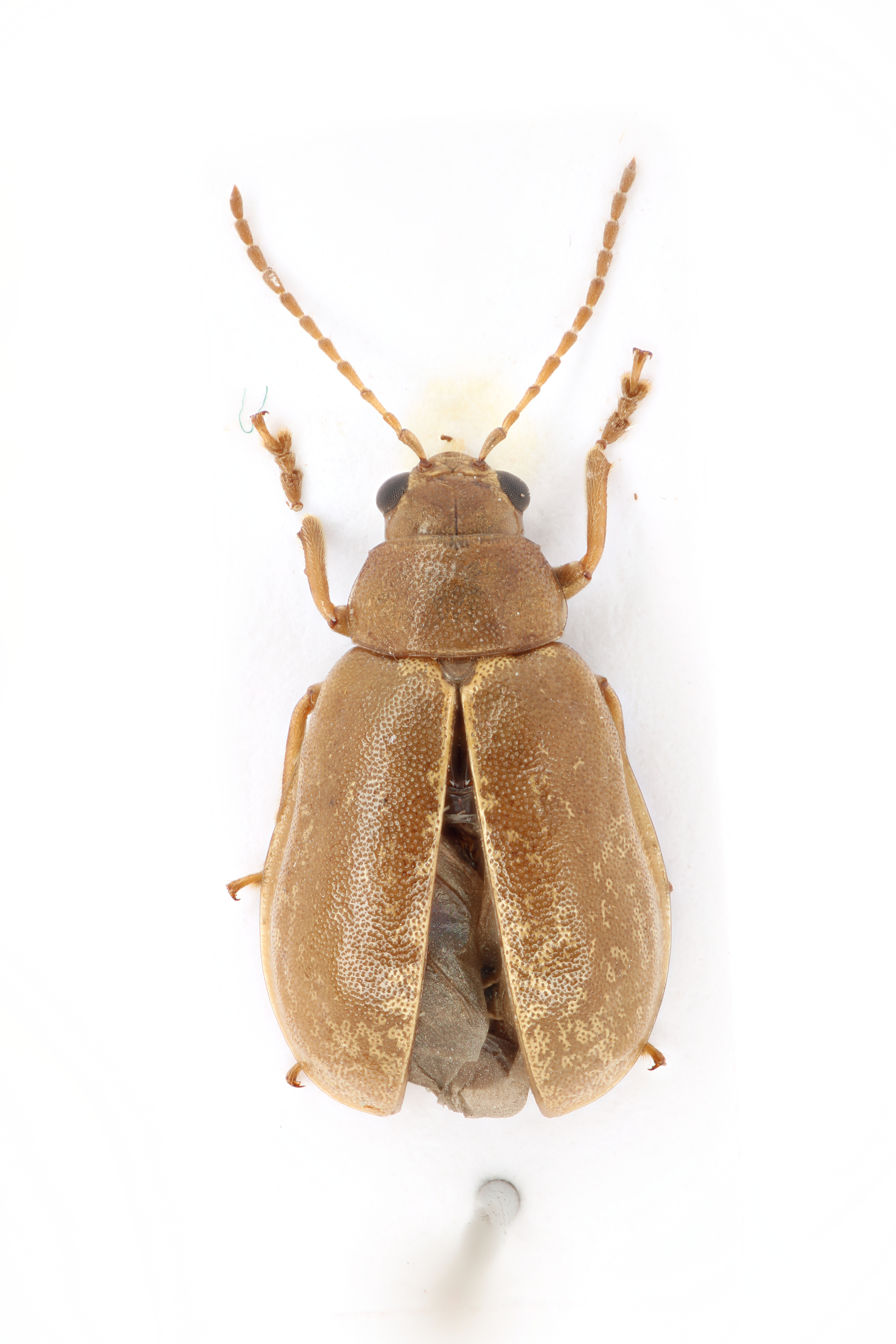
Chrysomelidae, Arimetus sp. Ivory Coast

Arimetus is a genus of beetles belonging to the family Chrysomelidae.

== Species ==
- Arimetus angulatus Laboissiere, 1922
- Arimetus apicalis Weise, 1917
- Arimetus conradti Jacoby, 1903
- Arimetus costulatus Laboissiere, 1922
- Arimetus jacobyi (Gahan, 1909)
- Arimetus tuberosus Laboissiere, 1929
