= Buphonida =

Scientific classification
- Kingdom: Animalia
- Phylum: Arthropoda
- Clade: Pancrustacea
- Class: Insecta
- Order: Coleoptera
- Suborder: Polyphaga
- Infraorder: Cucujiformia
- Family: Chrysomelidae
- Subfamily: Galerucinae
- Tribe: Galerucini
- Genus: Buphonida; Baly, 1865

Genus of leaf beetles

Buphonida is a genus of beetles belonging to the family Chrysomelidae.

== Species ==
- Buphonida evanida Baly, 1865
- Buphonida philippinensis Jacoby, 1895
- Buphonida piceolimbata Jacoby, 1892
- Buphonida placida (Baly, 1886)
- Buphonida punctata (Duvivier, 1884)
- Buphonida puncticollis Baly, 1886
- Buphonida submarginata (Baly, 1886)
