= Pseudespera =

Scientific classification
- Kingdom: Animalia
- Phylum: Arthropoda
- Clade: Pancrustacea
- Class: Insecta
- Order: Coleoptera
- Suborder: Polyphaga
- Infraorder: Cucujiformia
- Family: Chrysomelidae
- Subfamily: Galerucinae
- Tribe: Galerucini
- Genus: Pseudespera; Chen, Wang & Jiang, 1985

Genus of leaf beetles

Pseudespera is a genus of beetles belonging to the family Chrysomelidae.

== Species ==
- Pseudespera femoralis Chen, 1985
- Pseudespera paulowniae Jiang, 1992
- Pseudespera sericea Chen, 1985
- Pseudespera shennongjiana Chen, 1985
- Pseudespera sodalis Chen, 1985
- Pseudespera subfemoralis Jiang, 1992
