= Sastracella =

Scientific classification
- Kingdom: Animalia
- Phylum: Arthropoda
- Clade: Pancrustacea
- Class: Insecta
- Order: Coleoptera
- Suborder: Polyphaga
- Infraorder: Cucujiformia
- Family: Chrysomelidae
- Subfamily: Galerucinae
- Tribe: Galerucini
- Genus: Sastracella; Jacoby, 1899

Genus of leaf beetles

Sastracella is a genus of beetles belonging to the family Chrysomelidae.

== Species ==
- Sastracella abdominalis Kimoto, 1989
- Sastracella cinnamomea Yang in Yang, 1995
- Sastracella collaris Kimoto, 2001
- Sastracella fulvipennis (Jacoby, 1884)
- Sastracella laosensis Kimoto, 1989
- Sastracella sumatrana (Jacoby, 1899)
- Sastracella unicolor (Jacoby, 1884)
