= Nirinoides =

Scientific classification
- Kingdom: Animalia
- Phylum: Arthropoda
- Clade: Pancrustacea
- Class: Insecta
- Order: Coleoptera
- Suborder: Polyphaga
- Infraorder: Cucujiformia
- Family: Chrysomelidae
- Subfamily: Galerucinae
- Tribe: Galerucini
- Genus: Nirinoides; Jacoby, 1903

Genus of leaf beetles

Nirinoides is a genus of beetles belonging to the family Chrysomelidae.

== Species ==
- Nirinoides abdominalis Jacoby, 1903
- Nirinoides abyssinica (Jacoby, 1886)
- Nirinoides congoana Weise, 1915
- Nirinoides staudiugeri Jacoby, 1903
