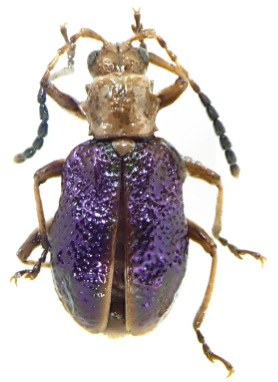

Scientific classification
- Kingdom: Animalia
- Phylum: Arthropoda
- Clade: Pancrustacea
- Class: Insecta
- Order: Coleoptera
- Suborder: Polyphaga
- Infraorder: Cucujiformia
- Family: Chrysomelidae
- Subfamily: Galerucinae
- Tribe: Galerucini
- Genus: Apteroyinga; Viswajyothi & Clark, 2020
- Species: A. andrewsi

Binomial name
- Apteroyinga andrewsi Viswajyothi & Clark, 2020

= Apteroyinga =

Genus of leaf beetles

Apteroyinga is a genus of leaf beetles belonging to the family Chrysomelidae. It contains one described species, Apteroyinga andrewsi, which is found in Costa Rica.
