= Monocestoides =

Scientific classification
- Kingdom: Animalia
- Phylum: Arthropoda
- Clade: Pancrustacea
- Class: Insecta
- Order: Coleoptera
- Suborder: Polyphaga
- Infraorder: Cucujiformia
- Family: Chrysomelidae
- Subfamily: Galerucinae
- Tribe: Galerucini
- Genus: Monocestoides; Duvivier, 1891

Genus of leaf beetles

Monocestoides is a genus of beetles belonging to the family Chrysomelidae.

== Species ==
- Monocestoides madagascariensis (Jacoby, 1901)
- Monocestoides perroti Duvivier, 1891
- Monocestoides testacea Bechyne, 1954
