= Megaleruca =

Scientific classification
- Kingdom: Animalia
- Phylum: Arthropoda
- Clade: Pancrustacea
- Class: Insecta
- Order: Coleoptera
- Suborder: Polyphaga
- Infraorder: Cucujiformia
- Family: Chrysomelidae
- Subfamily: Galerucinae
- Tribe: Galerucini
- Genus: Megaleruca; Laboissière, 1922

Genus of leaf beetles

Megaleruca is a genus of beetles belonging to the family Chrysomelidae.

== Species ==
- Megaleruca angolensis Bryant, 1955
- Megaleruca congoensis (Jacoby, 1895)
- Megaleruca costulata (Fairmaire, 1869)
- Megaleruca ganalensis (Gestro, 1895)
- Megaleruca geniculata (Harold, 1880)
- Megaleruca grieosericans (Thomson, 1858)
- Megaleruca hamaticornis (Laboissiere, 1921)
- Megaleruca humbloti (Duvivier, 1891)
- Megaleruca maculipes (Jacoby, 1886)
- Megaleruca nigripes Laboissiere, 1922
- Megaleruca obscura (Fabricius, 1801)
- Megaleruca parvicollis (Harold, 1879)
- Megaleruca placida Bryant, 1955
- Megaleruca pruinosa (Fairmaire, 1869)
- Megaleruca sericea (Jacoby, 1903)
- Megaleruca t-nigrum (Bertoloni, 1868)
- Megaleruca triloba (Fabricius, 1781)
- Megaleruca usambarica (Weise, 1901)
