= Parageina =

Scientific classification
- Kingdom: Animalia
- Phylum: Arthropoda
- Clade: Pancrustacea
- Class: Insecta
- Order: Coleoptera
- Suborder: Polyphaga
- Infraorder: Cucujiformia
- Family: Chrysomelidae
- Subfamily: Galerucinae
- Tribe: Galerucini
- Genus: Parageina; Laboissière, 1936

Genus of leaf beetles

Parageina is a genus of beetles belonging to the family Chrysomelidae.

== Species ==
- Parageina andrewesi (Jacoby, 1904)
- Parageina bouvieri Laboissiere, 1936
