= Salaminia (beetle) =

Scientific classification
- Kingdom: Animalia
- Phylum: Arthropoda
- Clade: Pancrustacea
- Class: Insecta
- Order: Coleoptera
- Suborder: Polyphaga
- Infraorder: Cucujiformia
- Family: Chrysomelidae
- Subfamily: Galerucinae
- Tribe: Galerucini
- Genus: Salaminia; Heller, 1898

Genus of leaf beetles

Salaminia is a genus of beetles belonging to the family Chrysomelidae.

== Species ==
- Salaminia concinna (Baly, 1879)
- Salaminia haroldi (Chapuis, 1875)
