= Eupachytoma =

Scientific classification
- Kingdom: Animalia
- Phylum: Arthropoda
- Clade: Pancrustacea
- Class: Insecta
- Order: Coleoptera
- Suborder: Polyphaga
- Infraorder: Cucujiformia
- Family: Chrysomelidae
- Subfamily: Galerucinae
- Tribe: Galerucini
- Genus: Eupachytoma; Laboissière, 1940

Genus of leaf beetles

Eupachytoma is a genus of beetles belonging to the family Chrysomelidae.

== Species ==
- Eupachytoma gigantea (Illiger, 1800)
- Eupachytoma maculicollis (Karsch, 1881)
- Eupachytoma mechowi (Weise, 1888)
- Eupachytoma oblonga (Laboissiere, 1922)
- Eupachytoma obscura (Gahan, 1892)
- Eupachytoma orientalis (Laboissiere, 1927)
- Eupachytoma quedenfeldti (Weise, 1888)
- Eupachytoma rugosa (Laboissiere, 1922)
- Eupachytoma similis (Laboissiere, 1922)
- Eupachytoma smaragdina (Weise, 1900)
- Eupachytoma truncata (Weise, 1888)
- Eupachytoma variegata (Laboissiere, 1920)
