= Luperocella =

Scientific classification
- Kingdom: Animalia
- Phylum: Arthropoda
- Clade: Pancrustacea
- Class: Insecta
- Order: Coleoptera
- Suborder: Polyphaga
- Infraorder: Cucujiformia
- Family: Chrysomelidae
- Subfamily: Galerucinae
- Tribe: Galerucini
- Genus: Luperocella; Jacoby, 1900

Genus of leaf beetles

Luperocella is a genus of beetles belonging to the family Chrysomelidae.

== Species ==
- Luperocella albopilosa (Jacoby, 1892)
- Luperocella hirsuta Jacoby, 1900
- Luperocella melancholica (Jacoby, 1889)
- Luperocella submetallescens (Baly, 1879)
