= Paraclitena =

Scientific classification
- Kingdom: Animalia
- Phylum: Arthropoda
- Clade: Pancrustacea
- Class: Insecta
- Order: Coleoptera
- Suborder: Polyphaga
- Infraorder: Cucujiformia
- Family: Chrysomelidae
- Subfamily: Galerucinae
- Tribe: Galerucini
- Genus: Paraclitena; Medvedev, 1972

Genus of leaf beetles

Paraclitena is a genus of beetles belonging to the family Chrysomelidae.

== Species ==
- Paraclitena ceylonica Medvedev, 1972
