= Pallasiola =

Scientific classification
- Kingdom: Animalia
- Phylum: Arthropoda
- Clade: Pancrustacea
- Class: Insecta
- Order: Coleoptera
- Suborder: Polyphaga
- Infraorder: Cucujiformia
- Family: Chrysomelidae
- Subfamily: Galerucinae
- Tribe: Galerucini
- Genus: Pallasiola; Jacobson, 1925

Synonyms
- Pallasia Weise, 1886 (preocc.)

Genus of leaf beetles

Pallasiola is a genus of beetles belonging to the family Chrysomelidae.

== Species ==
- Pallasiola absinthii (Pallas, 1773)
- Pallasiola pamirica (Mandl, 1968)
