= Hirtigaleruca =

Scientific classification
- Kingdom: Animalia
- Phylum: Arthropoda
- Clade: Pancrustacea
- Class: Insecta
- Order: Coleoptera
- Suborder: Polyphaga
- Infraorder: Cucujiformia
- Family: Chrysomelidae
- Subfamily: Galerucinae
- Tribe: Galerucini
- Genus: Hirtigaleruca; Chûjô, 1962

Genus of leaf beetles

Hirtigaleruca is a genus of beetles belonging to the family Chrysomelidae.

== Species ==
- Hirtigaleruca aptera Chujo, 1962
