= Apophylia =

Scientific classification
- Kingdom: Animalia
- Phylum: Arthropoda
- Clade: Pancrustacea
- Class: Insecta
- Order: Coleoptera
- Suborder: Polyphaga
- Infraorder: Cucujiformia
- Family: Chrysomelidae
- Subfamily: Galerucinae
- Tribe: Galerucini
- Genus: Apophylia; Thomson, 1858

Synonyms
- Malaxia Fairmaire, 1878; Glyptolus Jacoby, 1884; Galerucesthis Weise, 1897; Malaxioides Fairmaire, 1888; Bequaertinia Laboissière, 1922; Apophylana Medvedev, 2019

Genus of leaf beetles

Apophylia is a genus of beetles belonging to the family Chrysomelidae.

== Species ==
- Apophylia abdominalis (Laboissiere, 1929)
- Apophylia aeneipennis (Illiger, 1800)
- Apophylia aeruginosa (Hope, 1831)
- Apophylia alluaudi (Allard, 1888)
- Apophylia angolensis Laboissiere, 1921
- Apophylia angustata (Allard, 1889)
- Apophylia asahinai Chujo, 1962
- Apophylia aurolimbata (Allard, 1888)
- Apophylia basilana Pic, 1945
- Apophylia beeneni Bezdek, 2003
- Apophylia bertiae Bezdek, 2003
- Apophylia bifasciata Allard, 1889
- Apophylia borowieci Bezdek, 2004
- Apophylia brancuccii Medvedev in Medvedev & Sprecher-Uebersax, 1998
- Apophylia carinata Laboissiere, 1922
- Apophylia cervenkai Bezdek, 2005
- Apophylia cheni Bezdek & Zhang, 2006
- Apophylia chloroptera Thomson, 1858
- Apophylia ciliaticornis Pic, 1931
- Apophylia clavareaui Laboissiere, 1940
- Apophylia clavicornis Samoderzhenkov, 1988
- Apophylia clypeata Samoderzhenkov, 1988
- Apophylia consanguinea Allard, 1889
- Apophylia consociata Laboissiere, 1922
- Apophylia crassicornis Laboissiere, 1919
- Apophylia curvipes (Laboissiere, 1919)
- Apophylia cyaneolimbata Laboissiere, 1922
- Apophylia cyanipennis Laboissiere, 1927
- Apophylia dellacasai Bezdek, 2006
- Apophylia dembickyi Bezdek, 2006
- Apophylia demeyeri Bezdek, 2005
- Apophylia denisae Bezdek, 2005
- Apophylia dilaticornis (Jacoby, 1894)
- Apophylia disconotata Pic, 1947
- Apophylia elongata (Jacoby, 1896)
- Apophylia eoa (Ogloblin, 1936)
- Apophylia epipleuralis Laboissiere, 1927
- Apophylia eroshkinae Samoderzhenkov, 1988
- Apophylia excavata Bryant, 1954
- Apophylia femorata (Jacoby, 1895)
- Apophylia festiva (Fabricius, 1781)
- Apophylia flavovirens (Fairmaire, 1878)
- Apophylia frischi Bezdek, 2003
- Apophylia fruhstorferi (Pic, 1946)
- Apophylia ghesquierei (Laboissiere, 1940)
- Apophylia gloriosa Laboissiere, 1922
- Apophylia grobbelaarae Bezdek, 2006
- Apophylia hajeki Bezdek, 2003
- Apophylia haladai Bezdek, 2006
- Apophylia halberstadti Bezdek, 2006
- Apophylia hanka Bezdek, 2005
- Apophylia hebes Weise, 1904
- Apophylia himalayana Medvedev, 1993
- Apophylia holosericea Laboissiere, 1925
- Apophylia incisitarsis (Laboissiere, 1922)
- Apophylia ivoirensis Pic, 1945
- Apophylia javana (Pic, 1927)
- Apophylia jeanneli Laboissiere, 1921
- Apophylia jolantae Bezdek, 2007
- Apophylia kaffa Bezdek, 2005
- Apophylia kannegeiteri (Pic, 1946)
- Apophylia kantneri Bezdek, 2003
- Apophylia keniensis Laboissiere, 1919
- Apophylia kimotoi Bezdek, 2003
- Apophylia kivuensis Laboissiere, 1940
- Apophylia kubani Bezdek, 2005
- Apophylia laotica Bezdek, 2005
- Apophylia lata Pic, 1945
- Apophylia laticollis Laboissiere, 1922
- Apophylia lebongana (Maulik, 1936)
- Apophylia lesnei (Laboissiere, 1922)
- Apophylia levi Bezdek, 2004
- Apophylia libenae Bezdek, 2007
- Apophylia lindae Bezdek, 2006
- Apophylia loukashkimi (Gressitt & Kimoto, 1963)
- Apophylia luzonica Bezdek, 2003
- Apophylia maculicollis (Jacoby, 1895)
- Apophylia major Laboissiere, 1922
- Apophylia marginata (Jacoby, 1899)
- Apophylia marginicollis Laboissiere, 1940
- Apophylia marginipennis Weise, 1912
- Apophylia marketae Bezdek, 2006
- Apophylia marshalli (Jacoby, 1897)
- Apophylia martensi Bezdek, 2003
- Apophylia mauritanica Pic, 1944
- Apophylia maynei Laboissiere, 1922
- Apophylia medana (Pic, 1946)
- Apophylia medvedevi Samoderzhenkov, 1988
- Apophylia melli (Gressitt & Kimoto, 1963)
- Apophylia micheli Bezdek, 2003
- Apophylia mikhailovi Bezdek, 2003
- Apophylia mila Bezdek, 2005
- Apophylia mimica Samoderzhenkov, 1988
- Apophylia miyamotoi Kimoto, 1969
- Apophylia neavei Bezdek, 2005
- Apophylia nepalica Bezdek, 2003
- Apophylia nigriceps (Laboissiere, 1927)
- Apophylia nigricollis (Allard, 1888)
- Apophylia nigripes Chujo, 1935
- Apophylia nigrolimbata Laboissiere, 1940
- Apophylia nila Maulik, 1936
- Apophylia nilakrishna (Maulik, 1936)
- Apophylia nobilitata Gerstacker, 1871
- Apophylia oborili Bezdek, 2005
- Apophylia pacholatkoi Bezdek, 2005
- Apophylia pavlae Bezdek, 2003
- Apophylia pectoralis Pic, 1927
- Apophylia pesai Bezdek, 2006
- Apophylia phuphanensis Bezdek, 2006
- Apophylia poggii Bezdek, 2003
- Apophylia porraceipennis (Allard, 1889)
- Apophylia pulchella Bryant, 1952
- Apophylia purpurea (Allard, 1889)
- Apophylia quadristigmatica Laboissiere, 1922
- Apophylia raffrayi Pic, 1946
- Apophylia rugiceps (Gressitt & Kimoto, 1963)
- Apophylia saigonensis Pic, 1927
- Apophylia saliens Weise, 1904
- Apophylia samoderzhenkovi Medvedev, 1993
- Apophylia schawalleri Medvedev, 1992
- Apophylia schoutedeni Laboissiere, 1922
- Apophylia scutellaris Allard, 1889
- Apophylia semiobscura Fairmaire, 1887
- Apophylia sericea (Fabricius, 1798)
- Apophylia shirozui Takizawa, 1985
- Apophylia shuteae Bezdek, 2003
- Apophylia signatipennis (Pic, 1945)
- Apophylia sikkimensis Bezdek, 2003
- Apophylia similis Weise, 1910
- Apophylia snizeki Bezdek, 2005
- Apophylia sosia Laboissiere, 1940
- Apophylia sprecherae Bezdek, 2003
- Apophylia sulcata Laboissiere, 1922
- Apophylia taiwanica Bezdek, 2003
- Apophylia takizawai Bezdek, 2005
- Apophylia tarsalis Laboissiere, 1938
- Apophylia thalassina (Faldermann, 1835)
- Apophylia theresae Pic, 1944
- Apophylia thoracica (Gressitt & Kimoto, 1963)
- Apophylia trapezicollis Laboissiere, 1940
- Apophylia trinotata (Gressitt & Kimoto, 1963)
- Apophylia trochanterina (Gressitt & Kimoto, 1963)
- Apophylia variicollis (Laboissiere, 1927)
- Apophylia velai Bezdek, 2003
- Apophylia vernalis (Allard, 1889)
- Apophylia vicina Laboissiere, 1940
- Apophylia vietnamica Samoderzhenkov, 1988
- Apophylia viridipennis (Jacoby, 1885)
- Apophylia viridis (Jacoby, 1884)
- Apophylia voriseki Bezdek, 2003
- Apophylia weisei (Jacoby, 1896)
- Apophylia wittei Laboissiere, 1940
- Apophylia yangi Bezdek & Zhang, 2006
- Apophylia yunnanica Bezdek, 2003
- Apophylia zoiai Bezdek, 2005
