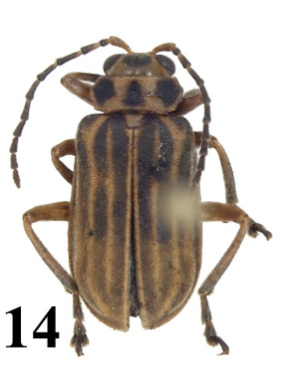
- Undescribed Megarhabda species

Scientific classification
- Kingdom: Animalia
- Phylum: Arthropoda
- Clade: Pancrustacea
- Class: Insecta
- Order: Coleoptera
- Suborder: Polyphaga
- Infraorder: Cucujiformia
- Family: Chrysomelidae
- Subfamily: Galerucinae
- Tribe: Galerucini
- Genus: Megarhabda; Viswajyothi & Clark, 2022

= Megarhabda =

Genus of leaf beetles

Megarhabda is a genus of beetles belonging to the family Chrysomelidae.

== Diagnosis ==
This genus is quite different from Trirhabda (the genus in which the single named species of Megarhabda was previously placed). Among other things, the pronotum of Megarhabdais is very short (about 2.5 times as broad as long). In this respect, the new genus is similar to Derospidea, but differs in the larger pronotal depressions and the more broadly explanate lateral pronotal margins

== Etymology ==
The genus name suggests a relationship to Trirhabda, but with unusually large size.

== Species ==
- Megarhabda obscurovittata (Jacoby, 1886) - Guatemala to Panama

The genus also includes an undescribed species from Guatemala and Mexico.
