= Radymna =

Scientific classification
- Kingdom: Animalia
- Phylum: Arthropoda
- Clade: Pancrustacea
- Class: Insecta
- Order: Coleoptera
- Suborder: Polyphaga
- Infraorder: Cucujiformia
- Family: Chrysomelidae
- Subfamily: Galerucinae
- Tribe: Galerucini
- Genus: Radymna; Reitter, 1913

Synonyms
- Prophyllis Reitter, 1913; Galerupipla Maulik, 1936; Farsogaleruca Lopatin, 1981

Genus of leaf beetles

Radymna is a genus of beetles belonging to the family Chrysomelidae.

== Species ==
- Radymna damascena
- Radymna fischeri
- Radymna insperabilis
- Radymna maculicollis
- Radymna nigrifrons
- Radymna persica
- Radymna quadrimaculata
- Radymna rickmersi
- Radymna rufina
