= Parapophylia =

Scientific classification
- Kingdom: Animalia
- Phylum: Arthropoda
- Clade: Pancrustacea
- Class: Insecta
- Order: Coleoptera
- Suborder: Polyphaga
- Infraorder: Cucujiformia
- Family: Chrysomelidae
- Subfamily: Galerucinae
- Tribe: Galerucini
- Genus: Parapophylia; Laboissière, 1922

Genus of leaf beetles

Parapophylia is a genus of beetles belonging to the family Chrysomelidae.

== Species ==
- Parapophylia cordicollis Laboissiere, 1924
- Parapophylia laeviuscula Laboissiere, 1922
