= Rupilia (beetle) =

Scientific classification
- Kingdom: Animalia
- Phylum: Arthropoda
- Clade: Pancrustacea
- Class: Insecta
- Order: Coleoptera
- Suborder: Polyphaga
- Infraorder: Cucujiformia
- Family: Chrysomelidae
- Subfamily: Galerucinae
- Tribe: Galerucini
- Genus: Rupilia; Clark, 1864

Genus of beetles

Rupilia is a genus of skeletonizing leaf beetles in the family Chrysomelidae. There are about 15 described species in Rupilia, found in Australasia.

== Species ==
These 15 species belong to the genus Rupilia:

- Rupilia angulaticollis Blackburn, 1900
- Rupilia approximans Blackburn, 1900
- Rupilia brevipennis Blackburn, 1896
- Rupilia cavicollis Lea, 1925
- Rupilia cribrata Lea, 1925
- Rupilia excelsa Blackburn, 1896
- Rupilia impressa Blackburn, 1889
- Rupilia insignis Lea, 1925
- Rupilia microptera Lea, 1925
- Rupilia ruficollis Clark, 1864
- Rupilia rugulosa Blackburn, 1892
- Rupilia suturalis Lea, 1925
- Rupilia tricolor Lea, 1925
- Rupilia viridiaenea Clark, 1864
- Rupilia viridipennis Lea, 1925
