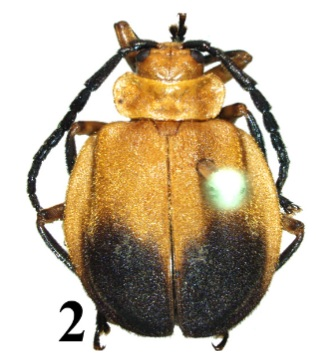

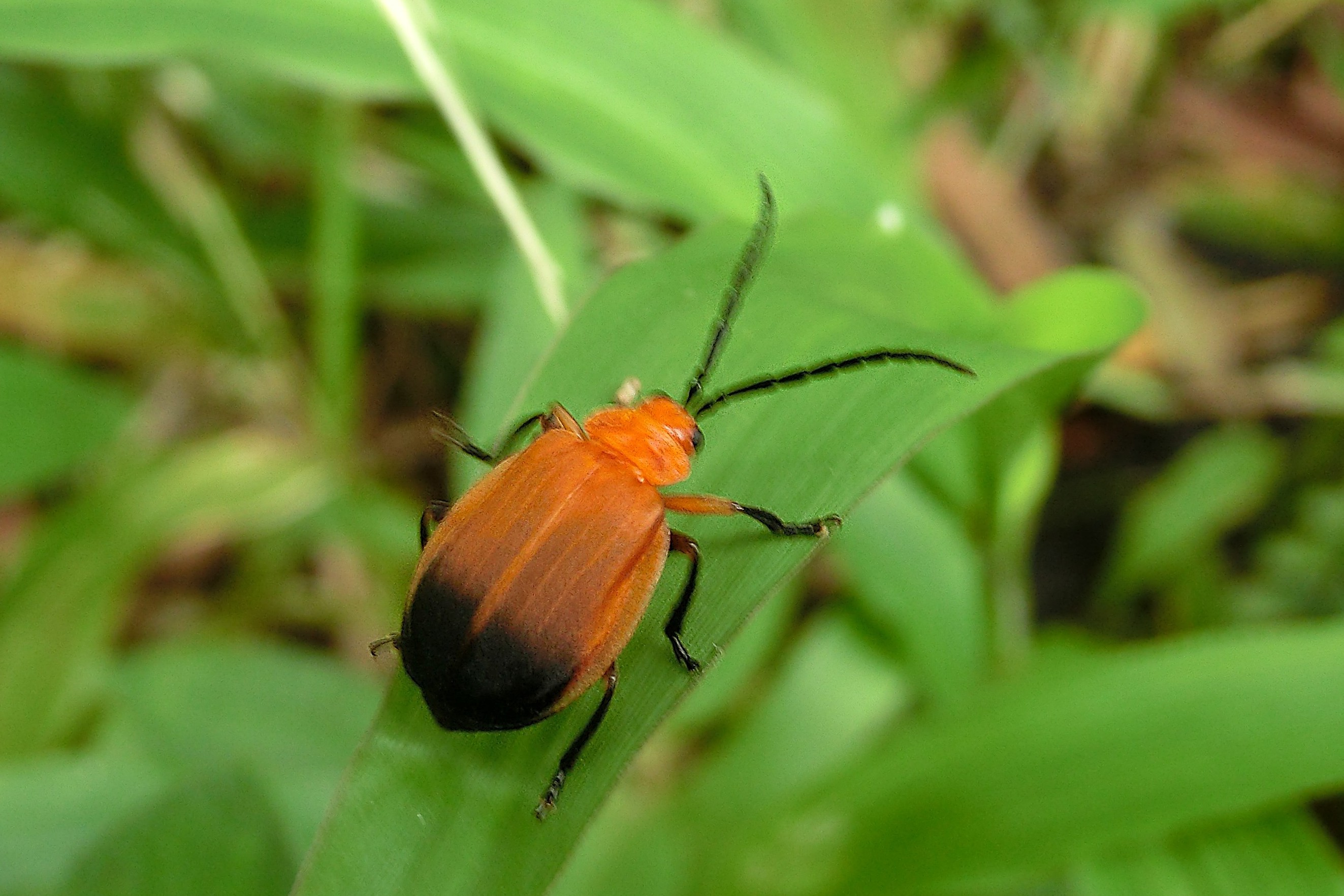

Scientific classification
- Kingdom: Animalia
- Phylum: Arthropoda
- Clade: Pancrustacea
- Class: Insecta
- Order: Coleoptera
- Suborder: Polyphaga
- Infraorder: Cucujiformia
- Family: Chrysomelidae
- Tribe: Galerucini
- Genus: Platycesta; Viswajyothi & Clark, 2021
- Species: P. depressa

Binomial name
- Platycesta depressa (Clark, 1865)

Synonyms
- Monocesta depressa Clark, 1865; Monocesta nicaraguensis Jacoby, 1877; Coelomera atrocaerulea Jacoby, 1878

= Platycesta =

Genus of leaf beetles

Platycesta is a genus of beetles belonging to the family Chrysomelidae. It is monotypic, the only species being Platycesta depressa.

== Distribution and ecology ==
Platycesta depressa occurs in Central and northwestern South America from Honduras to Peru. A record from the United States is considered erraneous. They feed on leaves of Cecropia.

== Description ==
Adults measure 8.7–13.2 mm (0.34–0.52 in) in length. The head, prothorax, and scutellar shield are yellow-brown to orange-brown. The antennae, tibiae, tarsi, and abdomen are black. However, the elytra are variable, ranging from entirely orange-brown to entirely black; the intermediate forms are basally pale and distally dark.
