= Belarima =

Scientific classification
- Kingdom: Animalia
- Phylum: Arthropoda
- Clade: Pancrustacea
- Class: Insecta
- Order: Coleoptera
- Suborder: Polyphaga
- Infraorder: Cucujiformia
- Family: Chrysomelidae
- Subfamily: Galerucinae
- Tribe: Galerucini
- Genus: Belarima; Reitter, 1913

Genus of leaf beetles

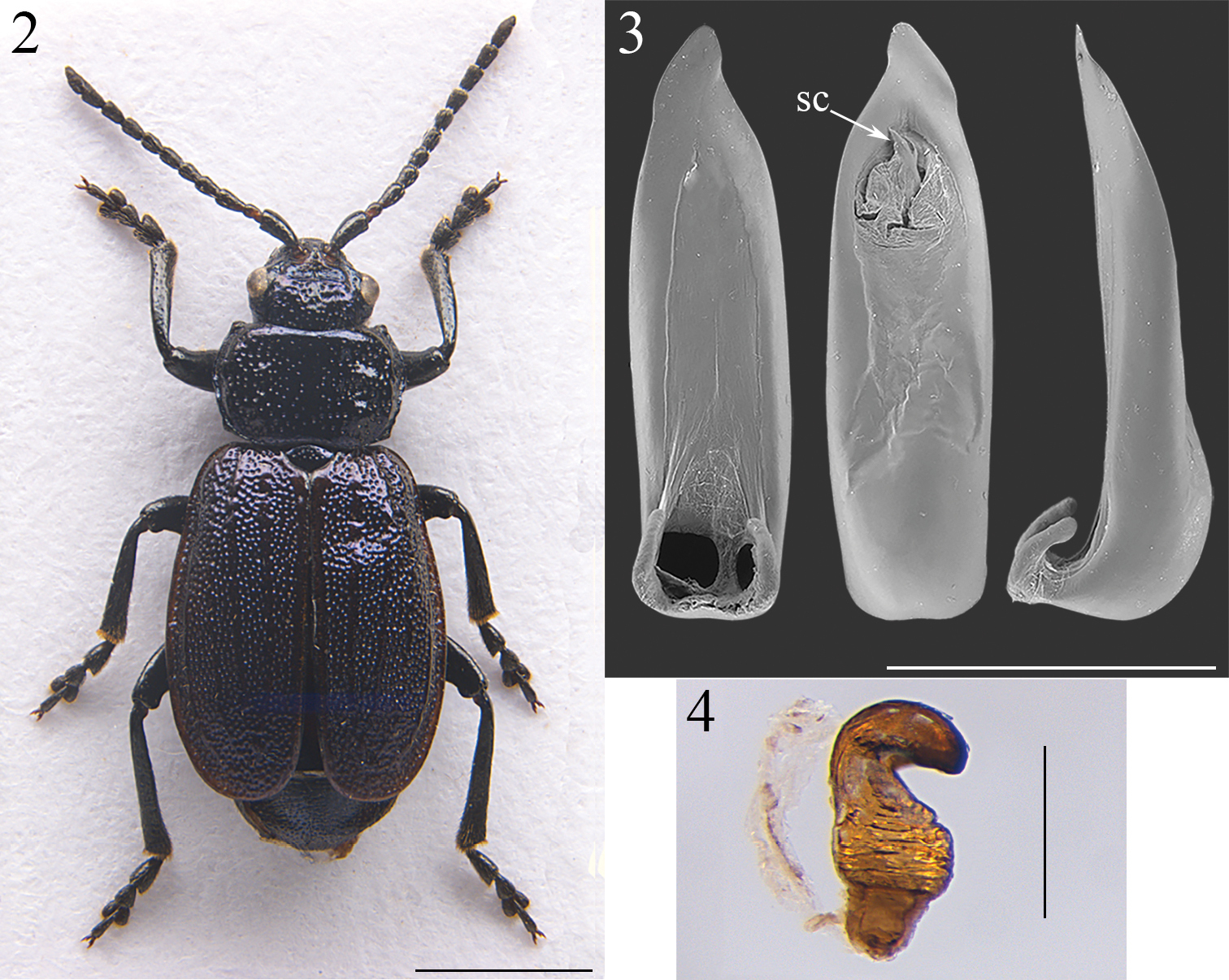
Belarima violacea

Belarima is a genus of beetles belonging to the family Chrysomelidae.

== Species ==
- Belarima obliqua
- Belarima violacea (Lucas, 1846)
