= Menippus (beetle) =

Scientific classification
- Kingdom: Animalia
- Phylum: Arthropoda
- Clade: Pancrustacea
- Class: Insecta
- Order: Coleoptera
- Suborder: Polyphaga
- Infraorder: Cucujiformia
- Family: Chrysomelidae
- Subfamily: Galerucinae
- Tribe: Galerucini
- Genus: Menippus; Clark, 1864

Synonyms
- Issikia Chûjô, 1961

Genus of beetles

Menippus is a genus of leaf beetles (Chrysomelidae).

== Habitat and Environment ==
This leaf beetle is mostly found in Australia, depending on the stringybark eucalyptus tree for food. The trees are also used to harbor eggs for future larvae.

== Species ==
Menippus contains the following species:

- Menippus aeneipennis Weise, 1892
- Menippus asahinai (Chûjô, 1962)
- Menippus beeneni Lee, Bezděk & Suenaga, 2012
- Menippus brevicornis (Jacoby, 1889)
- Menippus cervinus (Hope, 1831) (synonym: Menippus canellinus Fairmaire, 1889)
- Menippus clarki Jacoby, 1884
- Menippus cynicus Clark, 1864
- Menippus darcyi Reid & Nally, 2008
- Menippus dimidiaticornis (Jacoby, 1889)
- Menippus doeberli Suenaga, Lee & Bezděk, 2017
- Menippus ewani Reid & Nally, 2008
- Menippus fugitivus (Lea, 1926)
- Menippus gressitti Lee, Bezděk & Suenaga, 2012
- Menippus hsuehleeae Lee, Bezděk & Suenaga, 2012
- Menippus inconspicua (Jacoby, 1894)
- Menippus issikii (Chûjô, 1961)
- Menippus laterimaculata (Jacoby, 1886)
- Menippus marginipennis (Jacoby, 1894)
- Menippus metallicus Baly, 1886
- Menippus murzini Lee, Bezděk & Suenaga, 2012
- Menippus nepalensis Lee, Bezděk & Suenaga, 2012
- Menippus nigrocoeruleus Jacoby, 1886
- Menippus philippinensis Jacoby, 1894
- Menippus sakishimanus Suenaga, Lee & Bezděk, 2017
- Menippus sericea (Weise, 1889)
- Menippus sufi Reid & Nally, 2008
- Menippus viridis Duvivier, 1884
- Menippus yulensis (Jacoby, 1896)
