= Theone =

Scientific classification
- Kingdom: Animalia
- Phylum: Arthropoda
- Clade: Pancrustacea
- Class: Insecta
- Order: Coleoptera
- Suborder: Polyphaga
- Infraorder: Cucujiformia
- Family: Chrysomelidae
- Subfamily: Galerucinae
- Tribe: Galerucini
- Genus: Theone; Gistel, 1857

Synonyms
- Leptosonyx Weise, 1885; Leptonyx Jacobson, 1896

Genus of leaf beetles

Theone is a genus of beetles belonging to the family Chrysomelidae.

== Species ==
- Theone afghanistanica Mandl, 1968
- Theone costipennis Kirsch, 1880
- Theone filicornis (Jakob, 1957)
- Theone margelanica (Kraatz, 1882)
- Theone octocostata (Weise, 1912)
- Theone ornata (Jakob, 1957)
- Theone silphoides (Dalman, 1823)
- Theone silphoides Dalman, 1823
