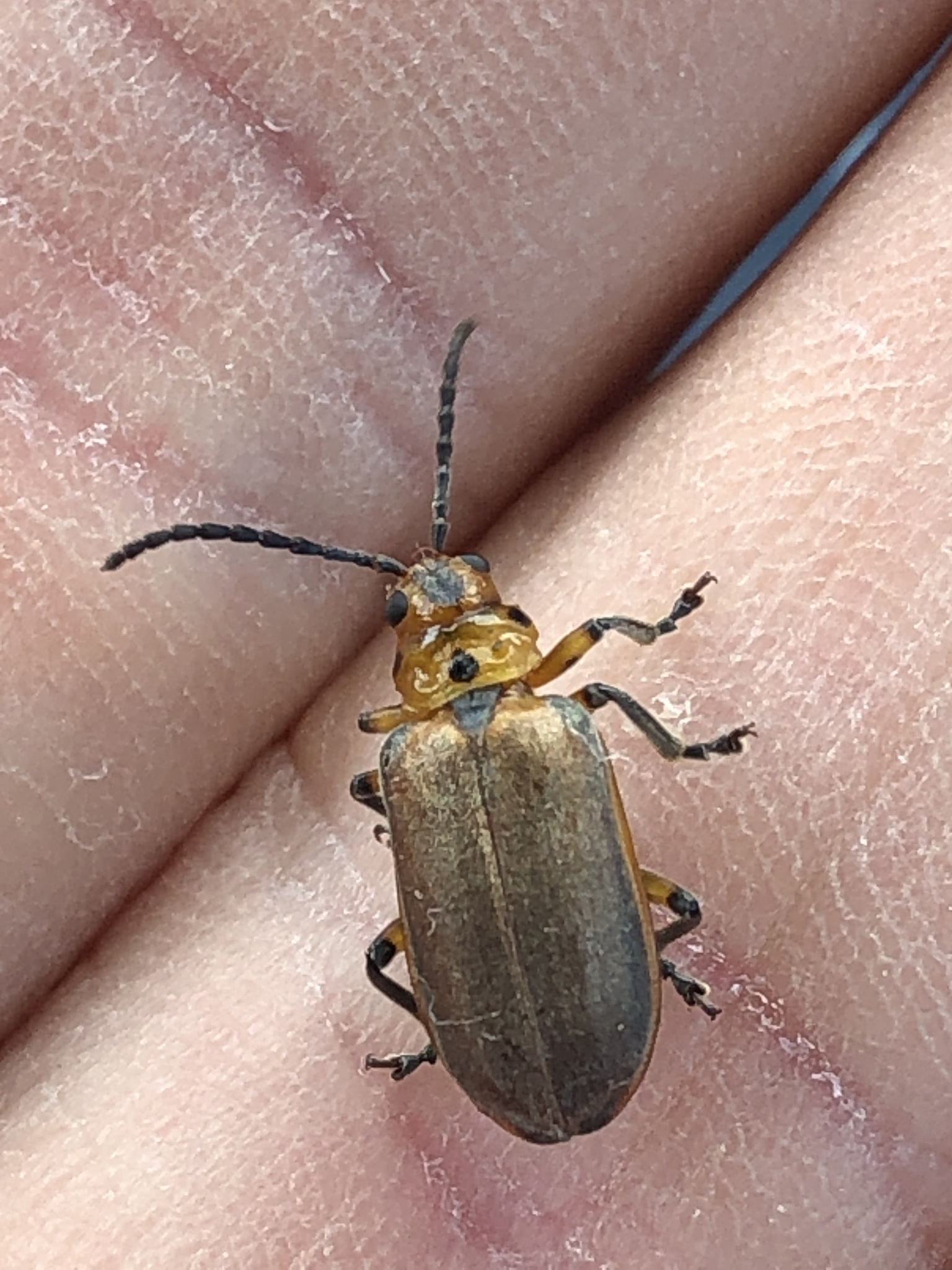
- Poneridia semipullata, figleaf beetle, Australia

Scientific classification
- Kingdom: Animalia
- Phylum: Arthropoda
- Clade: Pancrustacea
- Class: Insecta
- Order: Coleoptera
- Suborder: Polyphaga
- Infraorder: Cucujiformia
- Family: Chrysomelidae
- Subfamily: Galerucinae
- Tribe: Galerucini
- Genus: Poneridia; Weise, 1908

= Poneridia =

Genus of beetles

Poneridia is a genus of skeletonizing leaf beetles in the family Chrysomelidae. There are at least seven described species in Poneridia, found in Australasia and Indomalaya.

== Species ==
These seven species belong to the genus Poneridia:

- Poneridia australis (Boheman, 1859)
- Poneridia elegans (Blackburn, 1890)
- Poneridia lugens (Blackburn, 1896)
- Poneridia macdonaldi (Lea, 1895)
- Poneridia quadrinotata (Blackburn, 1890)
- Poneridia richmondensis (Blackburn, 1896)
- Poneridia semipullata (Clark, 1864) (figleaf beetle)
