= Mombasa (beetle) =

Scientific classification
- Kingdom: Animalia
- Phylum: Arthropoda
- Clade: Pancrustacea
- Class: Insecta
- Order: Coleoptera
- Suborder: Polyphaga
- Infraorder: Cucujiformia
- Family: Chrysomelidae
- Subfamily: Galerucinae
- Tribe: Galerucini
- Genus: Mombasa; Fairmaire, 1884

Genus of leaf beetles

Mombasa is a genus of beetles belonging to the family Chrysomelidae.

== Species ==
- Mombasa armicollis Fairmaire, 1884
- Mombasa magna (Weise, 1900)
- Mombasa subinermis Fairmaire, 1884
