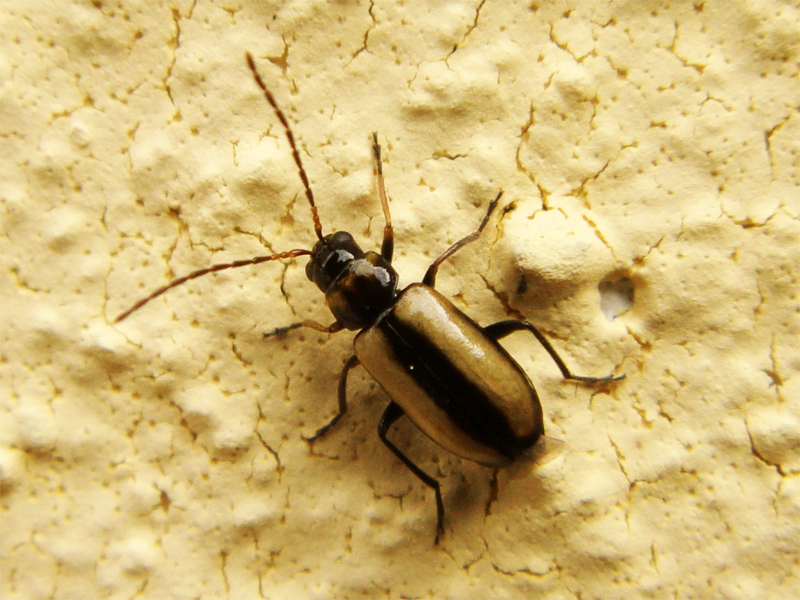
- Adult Calomicrus circumfusus

Scientific classification
- Kingdom: Animalia
- Phylum: Arthropoda
- Clade: Pancrustacea
- Class: Insecta
- Order: Coleoptera
- Suborder: Polyphaga
- Infraorder: Cucujiformia
- Family: Chrysomelidae
- Subfamily: Galerucinae
- Tribe: Luperini
- Genus: Calomicrus; Dillwyn, 1829

= Calomicrus =

Genus of beetles

Calomicrus is a genus of beetles belonging to the family Chrysomelidae.

== Species ==
Species in the genus include:

- Calomicrus albanicus (Csiki, 1940)
- Calomicrus algiricus (Weise, 1924)
- Calomicrus angorensis (Pic, 1913)
- Calomicrus annapurnae (Medvedev & Sprecher-Uebersax, 1999)
- Calomicrus arabicus (Lopatin & Nesterova, 2006)
- Calomicrus atricornis (Weise, 1907)
- Calomicrus atrocephalus (Reitter, 1895)
- Calomicrus atroviridis (Lopatin, 2006)
- Calomicrus azureus (Fairmaire, 1884)
- Calomicrus bicolor Kimoto, 1989
- Calomicrus bilineatus (Motschulsky, 1858)
- Calomicrus bispiniger (Israelson, 1969)
- Calomicrus bispiniger (Israelson, 1969)
- Calomicrus brunneus (Medvedev, 1992)
- Calomicrus buettikeri (Medvedev, 1996)
- Calomicrus carbunculus (Peyerimhoff, 1949)
- Calomicrus caucasicus (Weise, 1879)
- Calomicrus caucasicus Weise, 1879
- Calomicrus circumfusus (Marsham, 1802)
- Calomicrus circumfusus Marsham, 1802
- Calomicrus collaris (Kimoto, 1984)
- Calomicrus cous (Weise, 1889)
- Calomicrus cous Weise, 1889
- Calomicrus descarpentriesi (Codina, 1963)
- Calomicrus deserticola (Ogloblin, 1936)
- Calomicrus discicollis (Jacoby, 1899)
- Calomicrus discolor Faldermann, 1837
- Calomicrus discolor (Faldermann, 1837)
- Calomicrus diversepunctata (Pic, 1913)
- Calomicrus doramasensis (Vela & Garcia Becerra, 1996)
- Calomicrus espanoli (Godina, 1963)
- Calomicrus espanoli Codina Padilla, 1963
- Calomicrus fallax (Joannis, 1866)
- Calomicrus fallax Joannis, 1865
- Calomicrus flava (Jacoby, 1892)
- Calomicrus flavicinctus (Jacoby, 1899)
- Calomicrus flavipennis (Lucas, 1849)
- Calomicrus flaviventre (Baly, 1878)
- Calomicrus foveolatus (Rosenhauer, 1856)
- Calomicrus foveolatus (Rosenhauer, 1856)
- Calomicrus ghilarovi (Lopatin, 1988)
- Calomicrus grandis (Jacobson, 1894)
- Calomicrus gularis (Gredler, 1857)
- Calomicrus gularis Gredler, 1857
- Calomicrus gussakovskyi (Ogloblin, 1936)
- Calomicrus hartmanni (Medvedev, 1999)
- Calomicrus heydeni (Weise, 1900)
- Calomicrus hissaricus (Ogloblin, 1936)
- Calomicrus impressithorax (Pic, 1898)
- Calomicrus impressithorax (Pic, 1898)
- Calomicrus incertus (Jacoby, 1906)
- Calomicrus inconspicuus (Jacoby, 1897)
- Calomicrus karissimbicus (Weise, 1924)
- Calomicrus kaszabi (Lopatin, 1963)
- Calomicrus koenigi (Jacobson, 1897)
- Calomicrus kurosawai (Kimoto, 1969)
- Calomicrus lethierryi (Guillebeau, 1891)
- Calomicrus lineatus (Weise, 1889)
- Calomicrus lividus (Joannis, 1866)
- Calomicrus macedonicus (Tomov, 1975)
- Calomicrus mainlingus (Chen & Jiang, 1981)
- Calomicrus malkini (Warchalowski, 1991)
- Calomicrus marshalli (Jacoby, 1900)
- Calomicrus millingeni (Pic, 1915)
- Calomicrus mimica (Medvedev, 1998)
- Calomicrus minutissimus (Kimoto, 1996)
- Calomicrus miyamotoi (Kimoto, 1969)
- Calomicrus moralesi (Codina, 1963)
- Calomicrus nigriceps (Kimoto, 2004)
- Calomicrus nigritarsis (Joannis, 1866)
- Calomicrus nigrosuturalis (Jacoby, 1897)
- Calomicrus nuristanica (Medvedev, 1985)
- Calomicrus ochraceus (Lopatin, 2002)
- Calomicrus ophthalmicus (Ogloblin, 1936)
- Calomicrus orenitalis (Faldermann, 1837)
- Calomicrus orientalis (Faldermann, 1837)
- Calomicrus palii (Lopatin, 1965)
- Calomicrus pardoi (Codina, 1961)
- Calomicrus patanicus (Lopatin, 1966)
- Calomicrus persimilis Kimoto, 1989
- Calomicrus peyroni Pic, 1899
- Calomicrus pinicola (Duftschmid, 1825)
- Calomicrus pinicola Duftschmid, 1825
- Calomicrus porrectus (Normand, 1937)
- Calomicrus prujai (Codina, 1963)
- Calomicrus quercus (Pic, 1895)
- Calomicrus rottenbergi (Ragusa, 1873)
- Calomicrus rottenbergi Ragusa, 1873
- Calomicrus scutellatus (Jacoby, 1897)
- Calomicrus selecta (Jacoby, 1906)
- Calomicrus setulosus (Weise, 1886)
- Calomicrus setulosus Weise, 1886
- Calomicrus severini (Jacoby, 1896)
- Calomicrus shirozui Kimoto, 1969
- Calomicrus sordidus (Kiesenwetter, 1873)
- Calomicrus sordidus Kiesenwetter, 1873
- Calomicrus spurius Gressitt & Kimoto, 1963
- Calomicrus sugonjaevi (Lopatin, 1983)
- Calomicrus suisapanus (Gressitt & Kimoto, 1963)
- Calomicrus sulcicollis (Jacoby, 1900)
- Calomicrus suturalis (Joannis, 1866)
- Calomicrus suturalis Joannis, 1865
- Calomicrus syriacus (Weise, 1924)
- Calomicrus takagii Takizawa, 1988
- Calomicrus takizawai Medvedev, 1998
- Calomicrus vanharteni Lopatin, 2001
- Calomicrus warchalowskii Lopatin, 2005
- Calomicrus weisei (Jacoby, 1897)
- Calomicrus wilcoxi Lopatin, 1984
- Calomicrus wollastoni Paiva, 1861
- Calomicrus wollastoni Paiva, 1861
- Calomicrus yushunicus Chen & Jiang, 1981
