= Bryantiella (beetle) =

Scientific classification
- Kingdom: Animalia
- Phylum: Arthropoda
- Clade: Pancrustacea
- Class: Insecta
- Order: Coleoptera
- Suborder: Polyphaga
- Infraorder: Cucujiformia
- Family: Chrysomelidae
- Subfamily: Galerucinae
- Tribe: Galerucini
- Genus: Bryantiella; Medvedev, 2009

Synonyms
- Bryantia Medvedev, 2005 (preocc.)

Genus of leaf beetles

Bryantiella is a genus of beetles belonging to the family Chrysomelidae.

== Species ==
- Bryantiella rugosa (Bryant, 1957)
