= Marseulia =

Scientific classification
- Kingdom: Animalia
- Phylum: Arthropoda
- Clade: Pancrustacea
- Class: Insecta
- Order: Coleoptera
- Suborder: Polyphaga
- Infraorder: Cucujiformia
- Family: Chrysomelidae
- Tribe: Luperini
- Subtribe: Luperina
- Genus: Marseulia; Joannis, 1865

Genus of leaf beetles

Marseulia is a genus of beetles belonging to the family Chrysomelidae.

== Species ==
- Marseulia dilativentris (Reiche, 1858)
