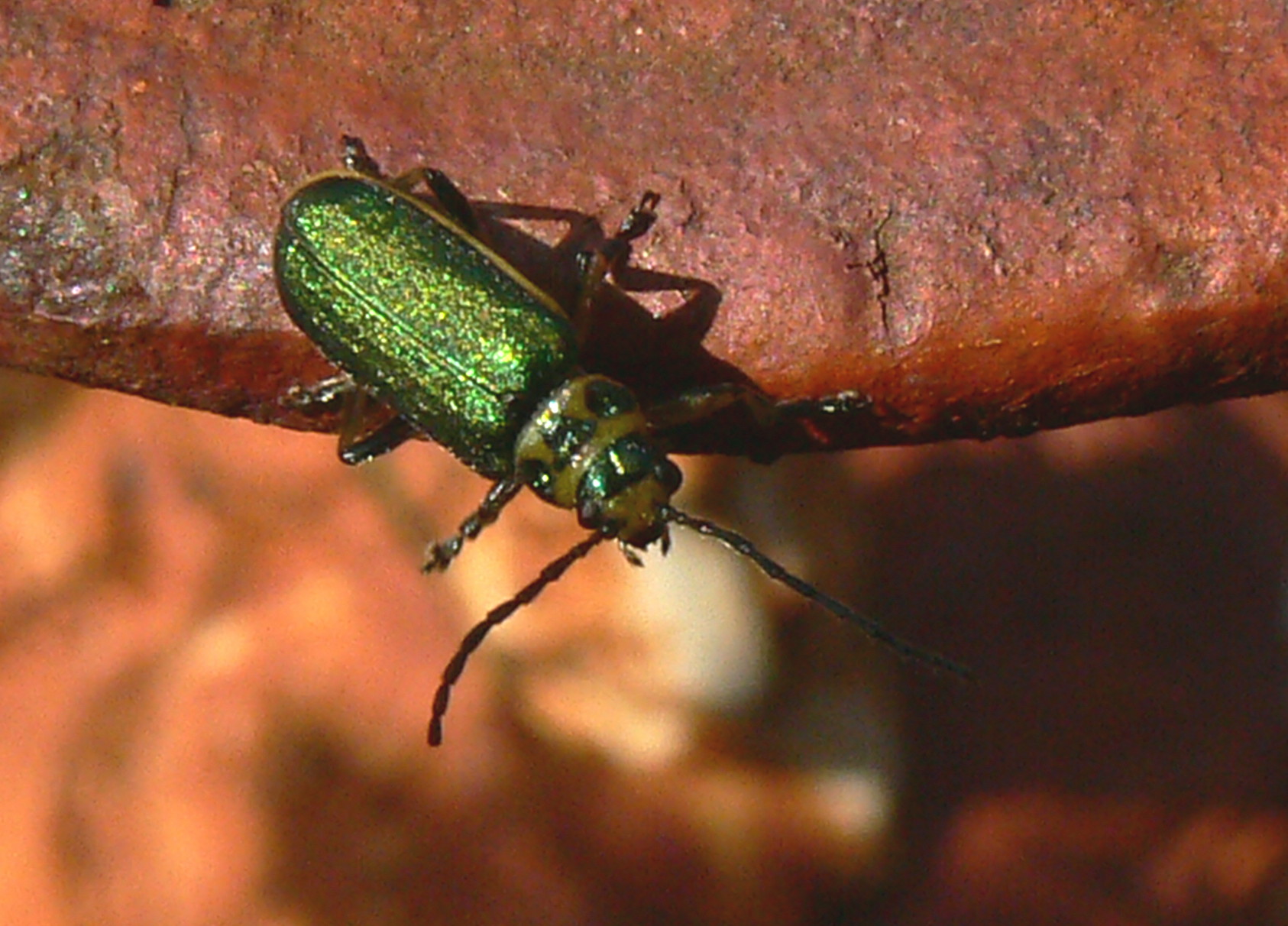
- Baccharis leaf beetle, Trirhabda flavolimbata

Scientific classification
- Kingdom: Animalia
- Phylum: Arthropoda
- Clade: Pancrustacea
- Class: Insecta
- Order: Coleoptera
- Suborder: Polyphaga
- Infraorder: Cucujiformia
- Family: Chrysomelidae
- Subfamily: Galerucinae; Latreille, 1802

Tribes
- Alticini Newman, 1834; Decarthrocerini Laboissière, 1937; Galerucini Latreille, 1802; Hylaspini Chapuis, 1875; Luperini Gistel, 1848; Metacyclini Chapuis, 1875; Oidini Laboissière, 1921 (1875); Serraticollini White, 1942; †Taimyralticini Nadein, 2018

= Galerucinae =

Galerucinae Temporal range: Santonian–Recent

Subfamily of beetles

Sermylassa halensis in copula

Phyllobrotica quadrimaculata

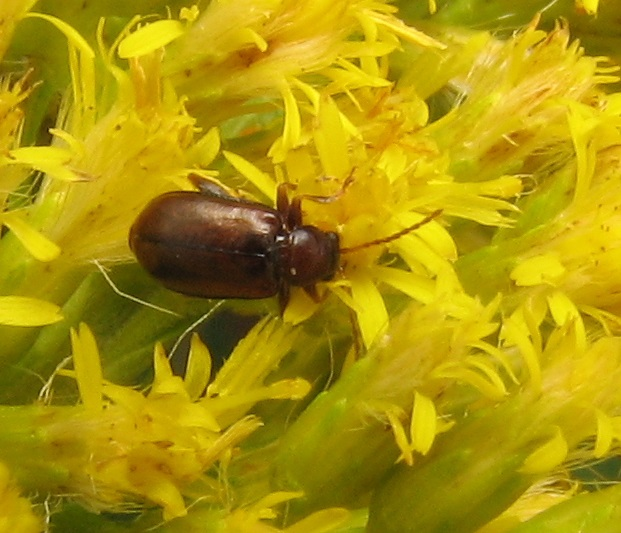
Luperaltica nigripalpis

The Galerucinae are a large subfamily of the leaf beetles (Chrysomelidae), containing about 15,000 species in more than 1,000 genera, of which about 500 genera and about 8,000 species make up the flea beetle tribe Alticini.

The division into tribes is more a matter of tradition than based on modern research. Some genera, for example Yingaresca, are better considered incertae sedis due to a general lack of knowledge. And while a good case can be made for some tribes – namely the Alticini and Galerucini – being all but monophyletic even in their traditional delimitation, others, such as Luperini, appear to be just paraphyletic assemblages.

Some classifications of Galerucinae include just two tribes, Alticini and Galerucini, and treat all of the tribes of Galerucinae sensu stricto (Decarthrocerini, Galerucini, Hylaspini, Luperini, Metacyclini and Oidini) as subtribes of Galerucini.

== Selected genera ==
- Acalymma
- Agelastica
- Aplosonyx
- Arima
- Asbecesta
- Aulacophora
- Belarima
- Calomicrus
- Cneorane
- Diorhabda
- Diabrotica
- Euluperus
- Exosoma
- Falsoexosoma
- Galeruca
- Galerucella
- Leptomona
- Lochmaea
- Longitarsus Latreille, 1829
- Luperus
- Marseulia
- Menippus Clark, 1864
- Monolepta
- Normaltica
- Nymphius
- Oides Weber, 1801
- Phyllobrotica
- Poneridia
- Psylliodes
- Pyrrhalta
- Sermylassa
- Theone
- Trirhabda
- Xanthogaleruca
- Yingaresca Bechyné, 1956

=== Fossil genera ===
- †Taimyraltica Nadein, 2018 Taimyr amber, Russia, Santonian

== See also ==
- List of Galerucinae genera (not including Alticini)
- List of flea beetle genera
