= Hans Silfverberg =

Finnish entomologist

Hans Silfverberg (b. 1943) is a Finnish entomologist from the Finnish Museum of Natural History. The beetle species Apion silfverbergi, Hyperaspis silfverbergi, and Sasajiscymnus silfverbergi are named in his honour.

He has described the following taxa, among others:

- Anatela Silfverberg, 1982
- Omiamima Silfverberg, 1977
- Oorlogia Silfverberg, 1978
- Taenala Silfverberg, 1978

Among his scientific contributions is a list of the Coleoptera present in the Baltic and Nordic countries, which he published in 1992.
