= Cannonia =

Cannonia may refer to:

- Cannonia (beetle), a genus of insects in the family Chrysomelidae
- Cannonia (fungus), a genus of fungi in the family Amphisphaeriaceae
