= Diacantha =

Diacantha may refer to:

- Diacantha (beetle), a genus of insects in the family Chrysomelidae
- Diacantha (plant), a genus of plants in the family Asteraceae
