= Palmaria =

Palmaria may refer to:

- Palmaria (island), an island in the Ligurian Sea, Italy
- Palmaria (artillery), an Italian-made self-propelled howitzer
- Palmaria (alga), a genus of red algae
  - Palmaria palmata, a species of red algae
- Palmaria (beetle), a genus of insects
