= Khasia =

Khasia may refer to:

- Khasia (beetle) Jacoby, 1899, a genus of insects in the family Chrysomelidae
- Khasia (mammal) Marshall and de Muizon, 1988, a genus of prehistoric mammals in the family Microbiotheriidae
