= Trachyscelida dichroma =

Scientific classification
- Kingdom: Animalia
- Phylum: Arthropoda
- Clade: Pancrustacea
- Class: Insecta
- Order: Coleoptera
- Suborder: Polyphaga
- Infraorder: Cucujiformia
- Family: Chrysomelidae
- Genus: Trachyscelida
- Species: T. dichroma

Binomial name
- Trachyscelida dichroma Viswajyothi & Clark, 2022

Synonyms
- Racenisa bicolor Bechyné, 1958 (preocc.)

Species of beetle

Trachyscelida dichroma is a species of beetle of the family Chrysomelidae. It is found in Bolivia.
