= Leptaulaca =

Scientific classification
- Kingdom: Animalia
- Phylum: Arthropoda
- Clade: Pancrustacea
- Class: Insecta
- Order: Coleoptera
- Suborder: Polyphaga
- Infraorder: Cucujiformia
- Family: Chrysomelidae
- Tribe: Luperini
- Subtribe: Aulacophorina
- Genus: Leptaulaca; Weise, 1902

Genus of leaf beetles

Leptaulaca is a genus of beetles belonging to the family Chrysomelidae.

== Species ==
- Leptaulaca albicans (Chapuis, 1879)
- Leptaulaca bifasciata Laboissiere, 1920
- Leptaulaca decolor (Thomson, 1858)
- Leptaulaca elegantula (Jacoby, 1895)
- Leptaulaca fissicollis (Thomson, 1858)
- Leptaulaca labiata Jacoby, 1906
- Leptaulaca longula (Weise, 1912)
- Leptaulaca maculicollis Jacoby, 1906
- Leptaulaca magna Weise, 1924
- Leptaulaca nigra Laboissiere, 1920
- Leptaulaca nigricornis Weise, 1902
- Leptaulaca pusilla (Weise, 1912)
- Leptaulaca schoutedeni Laboissiere, 1921
- Leptaulaca undecimpunctata (Klug, 1833)
- Leptaulaca venusta Laboissiere, 1930
