= Parasbecesta =

Scientific classification
- Kingdom: Animalia
- Phylum: Arthropoda
- Clade: Pancrustacea
- Class: Insecta
- Order: Coleoptera
- Suborder: Polyphaga
- Infraorder: Cucujiformia
- Family: Chrysomelidae
- Tribe: Luperini
- Subtribe: Aulacophorina
- Genus: Parasbecesta; Laboissière, 1940

Genus of leaf beetles

Parasbecesta is a genus of beetles belonging to the family Chrysomelidae.

== Species ==
- Parasbecesta breviuscula (Weise, 1904)
- Parasbecesta burgeoni Laboissiere, 1940
- Parasbecesta flavonigra Laboissiere, 1940
- Parasbecesta ituriensis (Weise, 1924)
- Parasbecesta personata Laboissiere, 1940
- Parasbecesta purpurea (Laboissiere, 1937)
- Parasbecesta rubida Laboissiere, 1940
- Parasbecesta ruwensorica (Weise, 1912)
