= Jolibrotica =

Scientific classification
- Kingdom: Animalia
- Phylum: Arthropoda
- Clade: Pancrustacea
- Class: Insecta
- Order: Coleoptera
- Suborder: Polyphaga
- Infraorder: Cucujiformia
- Family: Chrysomelidae
- Subfamily: Galerucinae
- Tribe: Luperini
- Subtribe: Luperina
- Genus: Jolibrotica; Lee & Bezděk, 2015

Genus of beetles

Jolibrotica is a genus of Asian leaf beetles in the subfamily Galerucinae and tribe Luperini (subtribe Luperina, section Phyllobroticites). The genus was erected by Chi-Feng Lee and Jan Bezděk in 2015, with species that were previously considered very similar to Phyllobrotica. They named Jolibrotica after the French entomologist Pierre Jolivet (1922-2020), who was a specialist in Chrysomelids. To date (2025), species have only been found in Taiwan.

== Species ==
The Global Biodiversity Information Facility includes:

1. Jolibrotica chujoi (Chujo, 1963) Kimoto, 1969
2. Jolibrotica sauteri (Chujo, 1935) – type species (as Luperus sauteri Chûjô)
