= Jacobyanella =

Scientific classification
- Kingdom: Animalia
- Phylum: Arthropoda
- Clade: Pancrustacea
- Class: Insecta
- Order: Coleoptera
- Suborder: Polyphaga
- Infraorder: Cucujiformia
- Family: Chrysomelidae
- Tribe: Luperini
- Subtribe: Aulacophorina
- Genus: Jacobyanella; Laboissière, 1924

Genus of leaf beetles

Jacobyanella is a genus of beetles belonging to the family Chrysomelidae.

== Species ==
- Jacobyanella amoena Weise, 1910
- Jacobyanella duvivieri (Jacoby, 1903)
- Jacobyanella elegantula (Duvivier, 1891)
- Jacobyanella femorata Laboissiere, 1924
- Jacobyanella hexaspilota (Fairmaire, 1888)
- Jacobyanella mettallica Bechyne, 1952
- Jacobyanella modesta (Brancsik, 1897)
- Jacobyanella quadriplagiata (Laboissiere, 1924)
