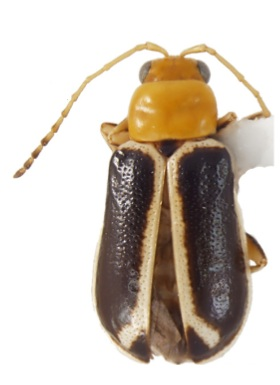

Scientific classification
- Kingdom: Animalia
- Phylum: Arthropoda
- Clade: Pancrustacea
- Class: Insecta
- Order: Coleoptera
- Suborder: Polyphaga
- Infraorder: Cucujiformia
- Family: Chrysomelidae
- Tribe: Luperini
- Subtribe: Diabroticina
- Genus: Cyclotrypema; Blake, 1966
- Species: C. furcata

Binomial name
- Cyclotrypema furcata (Olivier, 1808)

= Cyclotrypema =

Genus of beetles

Cyclotrypema is a genus of leaf beetles in the family Chrysomelidae. There is one described species in Cyclotrypema, Cyclotrypema furcata. They are found in Texas and Mexico.
