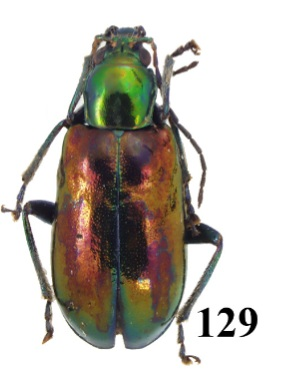

Scientific classification
- Kingdom: Animalia
- Phylum: Arthropoda
- Clade: Pancrustacea
- Class: Insecta
- Order: Coleoptera
- Suborder: Polyphaga
- Infraorder: Cucujiformia
- Family: Chrysomelidae
- Genus: Inbioluperus
- Species: I. flowersi

Binomial name
- Inbioluperus flowersi Clark, 1993

= Inbioluperus flowersi =

Species of beetle

Inbioluperus flowersi is a species of beetle of the family Chrysomelidae. It is found in Costa Rica.
