= Taumacera =

- Taumacera facialis

Scientific classification
- Kingdom: Animalia
- Phylum: Arthropoda
- Clade: Pancrustacea
- Class: Insecta
- Order: Coleoptera
- Suborder: Polyphaga
- Infraorder: Cucujiformia
- Family: Chrysomelidae
- Subfamily: Galerucinae
- Tribe: Luperini
- Genus: Taumacera; Thunberg, 1814

Type species
- Taumacera deusta Thunberg, 1814

Synonyms
- Xenarthra Baly, 1861; Doridea Baly, 1864; Platyxantha Baly, 1864; Thaumacera Gemminger & Harold, 1876 (unjustified emendation); Acroxena Baly, 1879; Neocharis Jacoby, 1881 (nec Sharp, 1877); Metellus Jacoby, 1886; Nacrea Baly, 1886; Neochrolea Jacoby, 1887; Paraenidea Laboissière, 1933; Platyxanthoides Laboissière, 1933; Kinabalua Mohamedsaid, 1997

Genus of leaf beetles

Taumacera is a genus of leaf beetles in the subfamily Galerucinae. The genus was described by Carl Peter Thunberg in 1814. It contains about 70 species distributed in the Oriental realm. About 20 African species are also classified in Taumacera, but they may actually belong in a different genus.

== Species ==
Species included in the genus (not including those from Africa), as of 2019:

- Taumacera antennata species-group:
  - Taumacera antennata (Mohamedsaid, 1997)
  - Taumacera musaamani (Mohamedsaid, 2010)
- Taumacera cervicornis species-group:
  - Taumacera cervicornis (Baly, 1861)
  - Taumacera lewisi (Jacoby, 1887)
  - Taumacera mirabilis (Jacoby, 1887)
  - Taumacera unicolor (Jacoby, 1887)
- Taumacera deusta species-group:
  - Taumacera centromaculata Medvedev, 2008
  - Taumacera constricta Mohamedsaid, 2002
  - Taumacera costatipennis (Jacoby, 1896)
  - Taumacera dekatevi Reid, 2001
  - Taumacera deusta Thunberg, 1814
  - Taumacera duri Mohamedsaid, 2001
  - Taumacera evi Reid, 1999
  - Taumacera fulvicollis (Jacoby, 1881)
  - Taumacera fulvovirens (Laboissière, 1929)
  - Taumacera khalednordini Mohamedsaid, 2010
  - Taumacera laevipennis (Jacoby, 1886)
  - Taumacera maculata (Baly, 1886)
  - Taumacera midtibialis Mohamedsaid, 1998
  - Taumacera mohamedsaidi Reid, 1999
  - Taumacera seminigra Reid, 1999
  - Taumacera subapicalis Mohamedsaid, 1993
  - Taumacera sucki (Weise, 1922)
  - Taumacera tibialis Mohamedsaid, 1994
  - Taumacera uniformis (Jacoby, 1891)
  - Taumacera warisan Mohamedsaid, 1998
- Taumacera insignis species-group:
  - Taumacera insignis (Baly, 1864)
  - Taumacera yamamotoi (Mohamedsaid, 1998)
- Taumacera nasuta species-group:
  - Taumacera clypeata (Baly, 1888)
  - Taumacera facialis (Baly, 1886)
  - Taumacera frontalis Mohamedsaid, 2001
  - Taumacera fulva (Kimoto, 1989)
  - Taumacera indicola Bezděk, 2019
  - Taumacera kimotoi Bezděk, 2019
  - Taumacera martensi (Medvedev, 1990)
  - Taumacera medvedevi Bezděk, 2019
  - Taumacera nasuta (Baly, 1879)
  - Taumacera paradoxa (Laboissière, 1936)
  - Taumacera samoderzhenkovi (Medvedev, 1992)
- Taumacera nigricornis species-group:
  - Taumacera nigricornis (Baly, 1864)
  - Taumacera rufomarginata (Jacoby, 1895)
  - Taumacera ventralis (Baly, 1864)
- Taumacera viridis species-group:
  - Taumacera aureipennis (Laboissière, 1933)
  - Taumacera bella (Weise, 1922)
  - Taumacera indica (Jacoby, 1889)
  - Taumacera insularis (Gressitt & Kimoto, 1965)
  - Taumacera magenta (Gressitt & Kimoto, 1965)
  - Taumacera occipitalis (Laboissière, 1933)
  - Taumacera sumatrensis (Jacoby, 1884)
  - Taumacera variceps (Laboissière, 1933)
  - Taumacera viridis (Hope, 1831)
- Unassigned species:
  - Taumacera antennalis Medvedev & Romantsov, 2013
  - Taumacera apicalis (Baly 1864)
  - Taumacera bifasciata (Jacoby, 1899)
  - Taumacera coxalis (Jacoby, 1899)
  - Taumacera indochinensis (Medvedev, 2004)
  - Taumacera jacobyi (Weise, 1922)
  - Taumacera javanensis (Jacoby, 1895)
  - Taumacera kinabaluensis (Mohamedsaid, 1995)
  - Taumacera monstrosa (Jacoby, 1899)
  - Taumacera multicostata (Jacoby, 1896)
  - Taumacera nagaii (Mohamedsaid, 1998)
  - Taumacera nigripennis (Jacoby, 1884)
  - Taumacera philippina (Weise, 1913)
  - Taumacera rubida (Allard, 1889)
  - Taumacera smaragdina (Duvivier, 1884)
  - Taumacera submetallica (Jacoby, 1896)
  - Taumacera sumatrana (Jacoby, 1899)
  - Taumacera suturalis (Duvivier, 1885)
  - Taumacera variabilis (Jacoby, 1891)
