= Shaira (beetle) =

Scientific classification
- Kingdom: Animalia
- Phylum: Arthropoda
- Clade: Pancrustacea
- Class: Insecta
- Order: Coleoptera
- Suborder: Polyphaga
- Infraorder: Cucujiformia
- Family: Chrysomelidae
- Tribe: Luperini
- Subtribe: Luperina
- Genus: Shaira; Maulik, 1936

Genus of leaf beetles

Shaira is a genus of beetles belonging to the family Chrysomelidae.

== Species ==
- Shaira atra Chen, 1987
- Shaira chujoi Kimoto, 1982
- Shaira fulvicollis Chen, 1987
- Shaira hemipteroides Lopatin, 2006
- Shaira maculata (Maulik, 1936)
- Shaira palnia Maulik, 1936
- Shaira quadriguttata Chen, 1987
