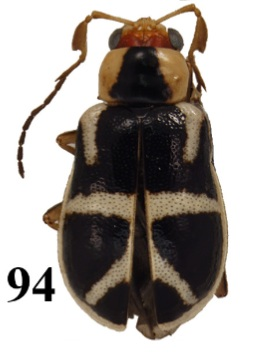

Scientific classification
- Kingdom: Animalia
- Phylum: Arthropoda
- Clade: Pancrustacea
- Class: Insecta
- Order: Coleoptera
- Suborder: Polyphaga
- Infraorder: Cucujiformia
- Family: Chrysomelidae
- Tribe: Luperini
- Subtribe: Diabroticina
- Genus: Metrobrotica; Bechyné, 1958
- Species: M. geometrica

Binomial name
- Metrobrotica geometrica (Erichson, 1847)

Synonyms
- Cerotoma geometrica Erichson, 1847

= Metrobrotica =

Genus of beetles

Metrobrotica is a genus of leaf beetles in the family Chrysomelidae. There is one described species in Metrobrotica, Metrobrotica geometrica, which is found in Bolivia, Ecuador and Peru.
