= Sonchia =

Scientific classification
- Kingdom: Animalia
- Phylum: Arthropoda
- Clade: Pancrustacea
- Class: Insecta
- Order: Coleoptera
- Suborder: Polyphaga
- Infraorder: Cucujiformia
- Family: Chrysomelidae
- Tribe: Luperini
- Subtribe: Aulacophorina
- Genus: Sonchia; Weise, 1901

Genus of leaf beetles

Sonchia is a genus of beetles belonging to the family Chrysomelidae.

== Species ==
- Sonchia apicipes (Jacoby, 1903)
- Sonchia sternalis (Fairmaire, 1888)
