= Paragetocera =

Scientific classification
- Kingdom: Animalia
- Phylum: Arthropoda
- Clade: Pancrustacea
- Class: Insecta
- Order: Coleoptera
- Suborder: Polyphaga
- Infraorder: Cucujiformia
- Family: Chrysomelidae
- Tribe: Luperini
- Subtribe: Aulacophorina
- Genus: Paragetocera; Laboissière, 1929

Genus of leaf beetles

Paragetocera is a genus of beetles belonging to the family Chrysomelidae.

== Species ==
- Paragetocera dilatipennis Zhang & Yang, 2004
- Paragetocera fasciata (Gressitt & Kimoto, 1963)
- Paragetocera flavipes (Chen, 1942)
- Paragetocera involuta (Laboissiere, 1929)
- Paragetocera nigricollis Zhang & Yang, 2004
- Paragetocera nigrimarginalis Jiang, 1992
- Paragetocera pallida (Chen, 1942)
- Paragetocera parvula (Laboissiere, 1929)
- Paragetocera tibialis (Chen, 1942)
- Paragetocera violaceipennis Zhang & Yang, 2004
- Paragetocera yunnanica Jiang, 1992
