= Erythrobapta =

Scientific classification
- Kingdom: Animalia
- Phylum: Arthropoda
- Clade: Pancrustacea
- Class: Insecta
- Order: Coleoptera
- Suborder: Polyphaga
- Infraorder: Cucujiformia
- Family: Chrysomelidae
- Tribe: Luperini
- Subtribe: Aulacophorina
- Genus: Erythrobapta; Weise, 1902

Genus of leaf beetles

Erythrobapta is a genus of beetles belonging to the family Chrysomelidae.

== Species ==
- Erythrobapta bennigseni Weise, 1902
- Erythrobapta gracilis Weise, 1902
- Erythrobapta punctipennis Weise, 1902
- Erythrobapta scutellaris Weise, 1902
- Erythrobapta variicornis Weise, 1902
- Erythrobapta viridipennis Laboissiere, 1932
- Erythrobapta zambeziana Laboissiere, 1931
