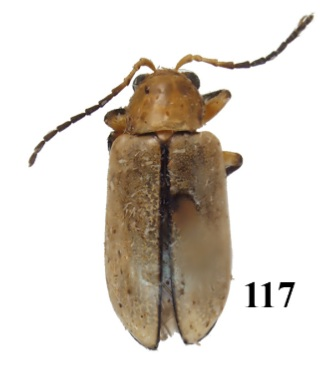

Scientific classification
- Kingdom: Animalia
- Phylum: Arthropoda
- Clade: Pancrustacea
- Class: Insecta
- Order: Coleoptera
- Suborder: Polyphaga
- Infraorder: Cucujiformia
- Family: Chrysomelidae
- Tribe: Luperini
- Subtribe: Luperina
- Genus: Geethaluperus; Viswajyothi & Clark, 2022
- Species: G. flavofemoratus

Binomial name
- Geethaluperus flavofemoratus (Jacoby, 1888)

Synonyms
- Luperus flavofemoratus Jacoby, 1888; Pseudoluperus flavofemoratus

= Geethaluperus =

Genus of beetles

Geethaluperus is a genus of leaf beetles in the family Chrysomelidae. It is monotypic, being represented by the single species , Geethaluperus flavofemoratus, which is found in the Neotropical ecozone.

== Description ==
This species is pale brown, except for the antennae and legs.

== Etymology ==
The name of the genus honours Geetha, the mother of the first author.
