= Inbioluperus costipennis =

Scientific classification
- Kingdom: Animalia
- Phylum: Arthropoda
- Clade: Pancrustacea
- Class: Insecta
- Order: Coleoptera
- Suborder: Polyphaga
- Infraorder: Cucujiformia
- Family: Chrysomelidae
- Genus: Inbioluperus
- Species: I. costipennis

Binomial name
- Inbioluperus costipennis Clark, 1993

Species of beetle

Inbioluperus costipennis is a species of beetle of the family Chrysomelidae. It is found in Costa Rica.
