= Prosmidia =

Scientific classification
- Kingdom: Animalia
- Phylum: Arthropoda
- Clade: Pancrustacea
- Class: Insecta
- Order: Coleoptera
- Suborder: Polyphaga
- Infraorder: Cucujiformia
- Family: Chrysomelidae
- Tribe: Luperini
- Subtribe: Aulacophorina
- Genus: Prosmidia; Weise, 1901

Genus of leaf beetles

Prosmidia is a genus of beetles belonging to the family Chrysomelidae.

== Species ==
- Prosmidia amoena Weise, 1904
- Prosmidia bispinosa (Fabricius, 1798)
- Prosmidia chevrolati Guérin, 1849
- Prosmidia conifera (Fairmaire, 1882)
- Prosmidia decempunctata (Laboissiere, 1926)
- Prosmidia excavata (Weise, 1909)
- Prosmidia fenestrata (Karsch, 1882)
- Prosmidia hastata (Laboissiere, 1921)
- Prosmidia maculosa Weise, 1907
- Prosmidia ornata (Laboissiere, 1926)
- Prosmidia passeti (Allard, 1888)
- Prosmidia sexplagiata (Jacoby, 1894)
- Prosmidia suahelorum Weise, 1901
- Prosmidia vicina (Gahan, 1909)
