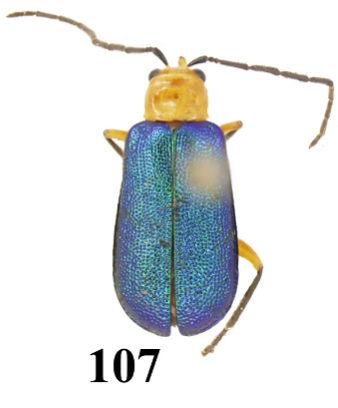

Scientific classification
- Kingdom: Animalia
- Phylum: Arthropoda
- Clade: Pancrustacea
- Class: Insecta
- Order: Coleoptera
- Suborder: Polyphaga
- Infraorder: Cucujiformia
- Family: Chrysomelidae
- Subfamily: Galerucinae
- Tribe: Luperini
- Subtribe: Diabroticina
- Genus: Trachyelytron; Viswajyothi & Clark, 2022
- Species: T. smaragdipennis

Binomial name
- Trachyelytron smaragdipennis (Jacoby, 1888)

Synonyms
- Chthoneis smaragdipennis Jacoby, 1888; Platymorpha smaragdipennis

= Trachyelytron =

Genus of beetles

Trachyelytron is a genus of leaf beetles in the family Chrysomelidae. There is one described species in Trachyelytron, Trachyelytron smaragdipennis, which is found in Guatemala. Specimens from Nicaragua probably belong to the same species, although the elytra are metallic purple, rather than metallic green.

== Etymology ==
The genus name is Greek for rough sheath, and it refers to the coarsely punctate elytra.
