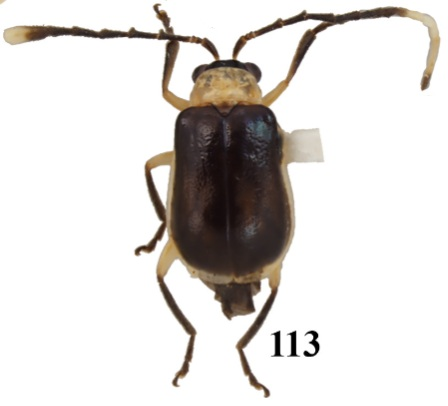

Scientific classification
- Kingdom: Animalia
- Phylum: Arthropoda
- Clade: Pancrustacea
- Class: Insecta
- Order: Coleoptera
- Suborder: Polyphaga
- Infraorder: Cucujiformia
- Family: Chrysomelidae
- Tribe: Luperini
- Subtribe: Diabroticina
- Genus: Deinocladus; Blake, 1966

= Deinocladus =

Genus of leaf beetles

Deinocladus is a genus of beetles belonging to the family Chrysomelidae.

== Species ==
- Deinocladus cartwrighti Blake, 1966
- Deinocladus fascicollis Blake, 1966
- Deinocladus pectiniconis (Baly, 1889)
