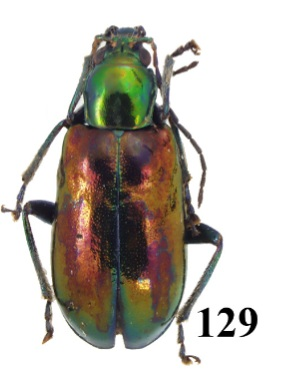
- Inbioluperus flowersi

Scientific classification
- Kingdom: Animalia
- Phylum: Arthropoda
- Clade: Pancrustacea
- Class: Insecta
- Order: Coleoptera
- Suborder: Polyphaga
- Infraorder: Cucujiformia
- Family: Chrysomelidae
- Tribe: Luperini
- Subtribe: Luperina
- Genus: Inbioluperus; Clark, 1993

= Inbioluperus =

Genus of leaf beetles

Inbioluperus is a genus of beetles belonging to the family Chrysomelidae.

== Species ==
- Inbioluperus costipennis Clark, 1993
- Inbioluperus flowersi Clark, 1993
