= Neodrana =

Scientific classification
- Kingdom: Animalia
- Phylum: Arthropoda
- Clade: Pancrustacea
- Class: Insecta
- Order: Coleoptera
- Suborder: Polyphaga
- Infraorder: Cucujiformia
- Family: Chrysomelidae
- Tribe: Luperini
- Subtribe: Luperina
- Genus: Neodrana; Jacoby, 1886

Genus of leaf beetles

Neodrana is a genus of beetles belonging to the family Chrysomelidae.

== Species ==
- Neodrana fasciata (Laboissiere, 1932)
- Neodrana leopoldi Laboissiere, 1932
- Neodrana semifulva Jacoby, 1886
- Neodrana tricolor Weise, 1908
