= Coeligetes =

Scientific classification
- Kingdom: Animalia
- Phylum: Arthropoda
- Clade: Pancrustacea
- Class: Insecta
- Order: Coleoptera
- Suborder: Polyphaga
- Infraorder: Cucujiformia
- Family: Chrysomelidae
- Tribe: Luperini
- Subtribe: Luperina
- Genus: Coeligetes; Jacoby, 1884

Genus of leaf beetles

Coeligetes is a genus of beetles belonging to the family Chrysomelidae.

== Species ==
- Coeligetes borneensis Mohamedsaid, 1994
- Coeligetes robustus (Allard, 1889)
- Coeligetes submetallica (Jacoby, 1884)
- Coeligetes unicolor (Jacoby, 1895)
- Coeligetes wilcoxi Mohamedsaid, 1994
