= Charaea =

Scientific classification
- Kingdom: Animalia
- Phylum: Arthropoda
- Clade: Pancrustacea
- Class: Insecta
- Order: Coleoptera
- Suborder: Polyphaga
- Infraorder: Cucujiformia
- Family: Chrysomelidae
- Tribe: Luperini
- Subtribe: Luperina
- Genus: Charaea; Baly, 1878

Synonyms
- Cneorides Jacoby, 1896

Genus of leaf beetles

Charaea is a genus of beetles belonging to the family Chrysomelidae.

== Species ==
- Charaea aeneofusca
- Charaea akkoae
- Charaea amamiensis
- Charaea balyi
- Charaea bezdeki
- Charaea bifurcatum
- Charaea boukali
- Charaea chinensis
- Charaea chujoi
- Charaea concolor
- Charaea coomani
- Charaea costatum
- Charaea cyanea
- Charaea diademata
- Charaea dinhcuongi
- Charaea flaviventris
- Charaea grahami
- Charaea hainanica
- Charaea haruoi
- Charaea houaphanicum
- Charaea houjayi
- Charaea hummeli
- Charaea icterica
- Charaea iniqua
- Charaea jacobyi
- Charaea jaromiri
- Charaea kelloggi
- Charaea khanhhoanica
- Charaea langeri
- Charaea latha
- Charaea lineata
- Charaea luzonicum
- Charaea maatsingi
- Charaea maxbarclayi
- Charaea merahkupak
- Charaea metallica
- Charaea mimicum
- Charaea minuta
- Charaea miyamotoi
- Charaea nigriventris
- Charaea nilgiriensis
- Charaea nobyi
- Charaea parvicollis
- Charaea pratti
- Charaea prosvirovi
- Charaea pseudoakkoae
- Charaea pseudominutum
- Charaea punctatolineata
- Charaea pytlaki
- Charaea sahyadrica
- Charaea sasajii
- Charaea sensarmai
- Charaea shirozui
- Charaea sikanga
- Charaea takagii
- Charaea taiwanum
- Charaea takagii
- Charaea yasudai
- Charaea yunnanum
- Charaea zaki
