= Microlepta =

Scientific classification
- Kingdom: Animalia
- Phylum: Arthropoda
- Clade: Pancrustacea
- Class: Insecta
- Order: Coleoptera
- Suborder: Polyphaga
- Infraorder: Cucujiformia
- Family: Chrysomelidae
- Tribe: Luperini
- Subtribe: Luperina
- Genus: Microlepta; Jacoby, 1886

Genus of leaf beetles

Microlepta is a genus of beetles belonging to the family Chrysomelidae.

== Species ==
- Microlepta celebensis (Jacoby, 1886)
- Microlepta coeruleipennis Jacoby, 1886
- Microlepta fulvicollis (Jacoby, 1896)
- Microlepta luperoides Weise, 1912
- Microlepta marginata Mohamedsaid, 1997
- Microlepta pallida (Jacoby, 1894)
- Microlepta palpalis (Jacoby, 1894)
- Microlepta tibialis Jacoby, 1894
