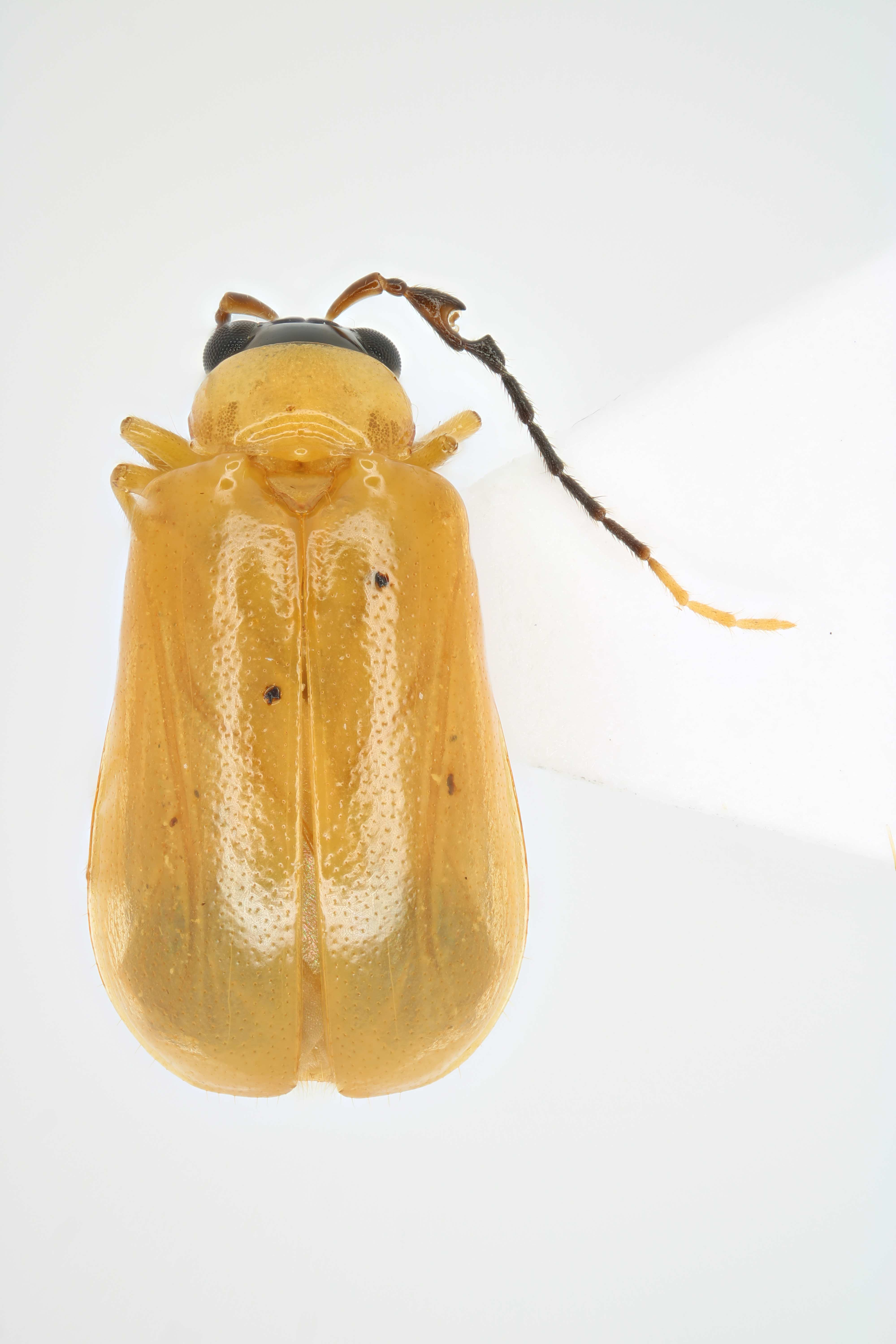
- Phyllobroticella kraatzi

Scientific classification
- Kingdom: Animalia
- Phylum: Arthropoda
- Clade: Pancrustacea
- Class: Insecta
- Order: Coleoptera
- Suborder: Polyphaga
- Infraorder: Cucujiformia
- Family: Chrysomelidae
- Tribe: Luperini
- Subtribe: Aulacophorina
- Genus: Pseudocophora; Jacoby, 1884

= Pseudocophora =

Genus of leaf beetles

Pseudocophora is a genus of beetles belonging to the family Chrysomelidae.

== Species ==
- Pseudocophora ambusta (Erichson, 1834)
- Pseudocophora apicalis (Laboissiere, 1932)
- Pseudocophora bicolor Jacoby, 1887
- Pseudocophora birmanica Jacoby, 1889
- Pseudocophora brunnea (Baly, 1886)
- Pseudocophora buqueti (Guérin, 1830)
- Pseudocophora carinata Yang, 1991
- Pseudocophora cochleata Yang, 1991
- Pseudocophora distincta Baly, 1888
- Pseudocophora emarginata Samoderzhenkov, 1992
- Pseudocophora erichsoni (Baly, 1888)
- Pseudocophora femoralis (Laboissiere, 1940)
- Pseudocophora flaveola (Baly, 1888)
- Pseudocophora flavipes (Weise, 1913)
- Pseudocophora inornata (Jacoby, 1893)
- Pseudocophora javanensis (Duvivier, 1891)
- Pseudocophora madoni Laboissiere, 1940
- Pseudocophora monticola Weise, 1913
- Pseudocophora nicobarica Jacoby, 1898
- Pseudocophora nitens (Allard, 1888)
- Pseudocophora pectoralis Baly, 1888
- Pseudocophora perplexa Baly, 1888
- Pseudocophora philippinensis Laboissiere, 1940
- Pseudocophora praeusta (Allard, 1888)
- Pseudocophora sumatrana (Jacoby, 1896)
- Pseudocophora uniplagiata (Jacoby, 1884)
- Pseudocophora ventralis Weise, 1913
- Pseudocophora wallacei (Baly, 1888)
