= Cynortina =

Scientific classification
- Kingdom: Animalia
- Phylum: Arthropoda
- Clade: Pancrustacea
- Class: Insecta
- Order: Coleoptera
- Suborder: Polyphaga
- Infraorder: Cucujiformia
- Family: Chrysomelidae
- Tribe: Luperini
- Subtribe: Luperina
- Genus: Cynortina; Weise, 1905

Genus of leaf beetles

Cynortina is a genus of beetles belonging to the family Chrysomelidae.

== Species ==
- Cynortina modesta Jacoby, 1895
