= Cneoranidea =

Scientific classification
- Kingdom: Animalia
- Phylum: Arthropoda
- Clade: Pancrustacea
- Class: Insecta
- Order: Coleoptera
- Suborder: Polyphaga
- Infraorder: Cucujiformia
- Family: Chrysomelidae
- Tribe: Luperini
- Subtribe: Luperina
- Genus: Cneoranidea; Chen, 1942

Synonyms
- Neocrane Chûjô, 1962

Genus of leaf beetles

Cneoranidea is a genus of beetles belonging to the family Chrysomelidae.

== Species ==
- Cneoranidea coryli Chen & Jiang, 1984
- Cneoranidea flammea Yang, 1993
- Cneoranidea hirta Yang, 1991
- Cneoranidea maculata Kimoto, 1989
- Cneoranidea melanocephala Yang in Li, Zhang & Xiang, 1997
- Cneoranidea parasinica Zhang & Yang, 2005
- Cneoranidea signatipes Chen, 1942
- Cneoranidea sinica Yang, 1991
- Cneoranidea wuyiensis Yang & Wang in Wang & Wu, 1998
