= Erganoides =

Scientific classification
- Kingdom: Animalia
- Phylum: Arthropoda
- Clade: Pancrustacea
- Class: Insecta
- Order: Coleoptera
- Suborder: Polyphaga
- Infraorder: Cucujiformia
- Family: Chrysomelidae
- Tribe: Luperini
- Subtribe: Luperina
- Genus: Erganoides; Jacoby, 1903

Genus of leaf beetles

Erganoides is a genus of beetles belonging to the family Chrysomelidae.

== Species ==
- Erganoides capito
- Erganoides collaris
- Erganoides discalis
- Erganoides occipitalis
- Erganoides pallens
- Erganoides punctulatus
- Erganoides similis
- Erganoides suturalis
- Erganoides tibialis
- Erganoides tsoui
- Erganoides variabilis
