= Samoria =

Scientific classification
- Kingdom: Animalia
- Phylum: Arthropoda
- Clade: Pancrustacea
- Class: Insecta
- Order: Coleoptera
- Suborder: Polyphaga
- Infraorder: Cucujiformia
- Family: Chrysomelidae
- Tribe: Luperini
- Subtribe: Aulacophorina
- Genus: Samoria; Silfverberg, 1982

Genus of leaf beetles

Samoria is a genus of beetles belonging to the family Chrysomelidae.

== Species ==
- Samoria fastuosa Silfverberg, 1982
- Samoria jeanneli (Laboissiere, 1918)
- Samoria speciosa Silfverberg, 1982
- Samoria violacea (Allard, 1888)
