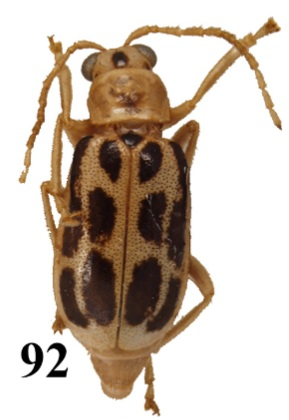

Scientific classification
- Kingdom: Animalia
- Phylum: Arthropoda
- Clade: Pancrustacea
- Class: Insecta
- Order: Coleoptera
- Suborder: Polyphaga
- Infraorder: Cucujiformia
- Family: Chrysomelidae
- Tribe: Luperini
- Subtribe: Diabroticina
- Genus: Hyperbrotica; Bechyné & Bechyné, 1968
- Species: H. ebraea

Binomial name
- Hyperbrotica ebraea (Fabricius, 1787)

Synonyms
- Crioceris ebraea Fabricius, 1787

= Hyperbrotica =

Genus of beetles

Hyperbrotica is a genus of leaf beetles in the family Chrysomelidae. There is one described species in Hyperbrotica, Hyperbrotica ebraea, which is found in northern South America.

== Subspecies ==
- Hyperbrotica ebraea ebraea
- Hyperbrotica ebraea oblongopunctata Jacoby
