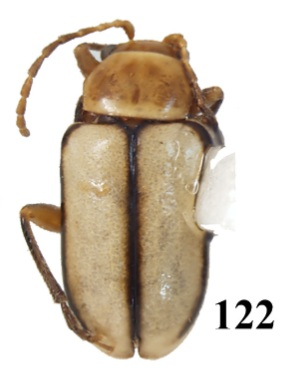

Scientific classification
- Kingdom: Animalia
- Phylum: Arthropoda
- Clade: Pancrustacea
- Class: Insecta
- Order: Coleoptera
- Suborder: Polyphaga
- Infraorder: Cucujiformia
- Family: Chrysomelidae
- Tribe: Luperini
- Subtribe: Luperina
- Genus: Cornuventer; Viswajyothi & Clark, 2022
- Species: C. tuberculatus

Binomial name
- Cornuventer tuberculatus (Blake, 1942)

Synonyms
- Luperodes tuberculatus Blake, 1942; Pseudoluperus tuberculatus

= Cornuventer =

Genus of beetles

Cornuventer is a genus of leaf beetles in the family Chrysomelidae. It is monotypic, being represented by the single species, Cornuventer tuberculatus, which is found in California.

== Etymology ==
The name of the genus is Latin for horn belly and refers to the abdominal appendages of the male.
