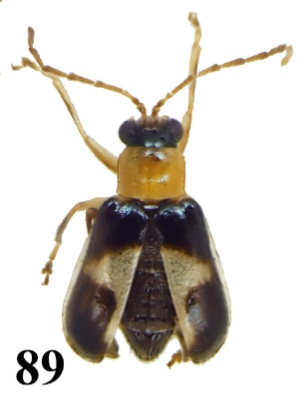

Scientific classification
- Kingdom: Animalia
- Phylum: Arthropoda
- Clade: Pancrustacea
- Class: Insecta
- Order: Coleoptera
- Suborder: Polyphaga
- Infraorder: Cucujiformia
- Family: Chrysomelidae
- Genus: Heterochele
- Species: H. actias

Binomial name
- Heterochele actias Viswajyothi & Clark, 2021

= Heterochele actias =

Species of beetle

Heterochele actias is a species of beetle of the family Chrysomelidae. It is found in Costa Rica.
