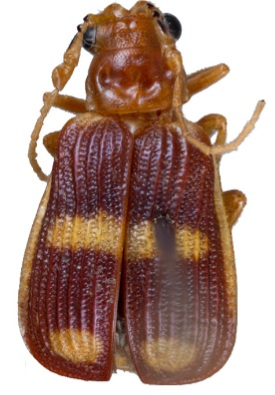

Scientific classification
- Kingdom: Animalia
- Phylum: Arthropoda
- Clade: Pancrustacea
- Class: Insecta
- Order: Coleoptera
- Suborder: Polyphaga
- Infraorder: Cucujiformia
- Family: Chrysomelidae
- Tribe: Luperini
- Subtribe: Diabroticina
- Genus: Eucerotoma; Laboissière, 1939

= Eucerotoma =

Genus of leaf beetles

Eucerotoma is a genus of beetles belonging to the family Chrysomelidae.

== Species ==
- Eucerotoma alternata (Baly, 1866)
- Eucerotoma amazona (Baly, 1866)
- Eucerotoma boliviana Bechyne, 1956
- Eucerotoma capitata Bechyne, 1956
- Eucerotoma congener (Baly, 1866)
- Eucerotoma contubernails (Baly, 1866)
- Eucerotoma decemguttata (Weise, 1921)
- Eucerotoma degandei (Baly, 1866)
- Eucerotoma excavata (Baly, 1866)
- Eucerotoma huallagensis Bechyne, 1951
- Eucerotoma mapiriensis (Bechyne, 1956)
- Eucerotoma obsoleta (Weise, 1921)
- Eucerotoma octopunctata (Bechyne, 1956)
- Eucerotoma perplexa (Baly, 1866)
- Eucerotoma pulchra (Baly, 1866)
- Eucerotoma septemmaculata (Weise, 1921)
- Eucerotoma timothea (Bechyne, 1956)
- Eucerotoma transversofasciata (Baly, 1866)
- Eucerotoma varicornis (Fabricius, 1801)
- Eucerotoma xanthopus (Perty, 1832)
