= Phyllobroticella =

Scientific classification
- Kingdom: Animalia
- Phylum: Arthropoda
- Clade: Pancrustacea
- Class: Insecta
- Order: Coleoptera
- Suborder: Polyphaga
- Infraorder: Cucujiformia
- Family: Chrysomelidae
- Tribe: Luperini
- Subtribe: Aulacophorina
- Genus: Phyllobroticella; Jacoby, 1894

Genus of leaf beetles

Phyllobroticella is a genus of beetles belonging to the family Chrysomelidae.

== Species ==
- Phyllobroticella africana (Jacoby, 1894)
- Phyllobroticella citrina Weise, 1903
- Phyllobroticella ferruginea Laboissiere, 1924
- Phyllobroticella flava Jacoby, 1894
- Phyllobroticella kraatzi Weise, 1902
- Phyllobroticella maynei Laboissiere, 1924
- Phyllobroticella nigripennis Laboissiere, 1924
- Phyllobroticella ochracea Weise, 1901
- Phyllobroticella pallida Laboissiere, 1924
- Phyllobroticella piciceps Weise, 1901
- Phyllobroticella straminea (Weise, 1903)
