= Neorupilia =

Scientific classification
- Kingdom: Animalia
- Phylum: Arthropoda
- Clade: Pancrustacea
- Class: Insecta
- Order: Coleoptera
- Suborder: Polyphaga
- Infraorder: Cucujiformia
- Family: Chrysomelidae
- Tribe: Luperini
- Subtribe: Luperina
- Genus: Neorupilia; Blackburn, 1888

Genus of leaf beetles

Neorupilia is a genus of beetles belonging to the family Chrysomelidae.

== Species ==
- Neorupilia flava Lea, 1925
- Neorupilia fusca (Oke, 1932)
- Neorupilia humeralis (Lea, 1925)
- Neorupilia ornata (Blackburn, 1896)
- Neorupilia stirlingi (Blackburn, 1889)
- Neorupilia viridis (Blackburn, 1888)
