= Laetiacantha =

Scientific classification
- Kingdom: Animalia
- Phylum: Arthropoda
- Clade: Pancrustacea
- Class: Insecta
- Order: Coleoptera
- Suborder: Polyphaga
- Infraorder: Cucujiformia
- Family: Chrysomelidae
- Tribe: Luperini
- Subtribe: Aulacophorina
- Genus: Laetiacantha; Laboissière, 1921

Genus of leaf beetles

Laetiacantha is a genus of beetles belonging to the family Chrysomelidae.

== Species ==
- Laetiacantha distincta (Gahan, 1893)
- Laetiacantha elegans Laboissiere, 1923
- Laetiacantha ruficollis Laboissiere, 1921
- Laetiacantha subsudanica (Weise, 1907)
- Laetiacantha zavattarii Laboissiere, 1938
