= Cerophysa =

Scientific classification
- Kingdom: Animalia
- Phylum: Arthropoda
- Clade: Pancrustacea
- Class: Insecta
- Order: Coleoptera
- Suborder: Polyphaga
- Infraorder: Cucujiformia
- Family: Chrysomelidae
- Tribe: Luperini
- Subtribe: Luperina
- Genus: Cerophysa; Chevrolat, 1837

Synonyms
- Oedicerus Kollar & L. Redtenbacher, 1844; Ozomena Chevrolat, 1845; Luperomorphella Chûjô, 1964; Taumaceroides Lopatin in Lopatin & Konstantinov, 2009

Genus of leaf beetles

Cerophysa is a genus of beetles belonging to the family Chrysomelidae.

== Species ==
- Cerophysa aeneipennis Bryant, 1954
- Cerophysa andrewesi Jacoby, 1904
- Cerophysa aseanica Mohamedsaid, 2001
- Cerophysa biplagiata Duvivier, 1885
- Cerophysa borneensis Jacoby, 1895
- Cerophysa coomani Laboissiere, 1930
- Cerophysa darjeelingensis Takizawa & Basu, 1987
- Cerophysa doisuthepica (Kimoto, 1989)
- Cerophysa dwiwarna Mohamedsaid, 2003
- Cerophysa erberi Beenen, 2005
- Cerophysa flava Baly, 1886
- Cerophysa fulvicollis Jacoby, 1892
- Cerophysa gestroi Jacoby, 1892
- Cerophysa javanensis Mohamedsaid, 1996
- Cerophysa laosensis (Kimoto, 1989)
- Cerophysa mandarensis Jacoby, 1904
- Cerophysa metallica Laboissiere, 1930
- Cerophysa monstrosa Jacoby, 1892
- Cerophysa nigricollis Jacoby, 1896
- Cerophysa nigricornis Jacoby, 1896
- Cerophysa nodicornis (Wiedemann, 1823)
- Cerophysa oculata Mohamedsaid, 2003
- Cerophysa pulchella Laboissiere, 1930
- Cerophysa rufofuscus (Clark, 1865)
- Cerophysa siamensis Jacoby, 1905
- Cerophysa sitihasmah Mohamedsaid, 2003
- Cerophysa splendens Duvivier, 1885
- Cerophysa tamra (Maulik, 1936)
- Cerophysa sumatrensis Jacoby, 1884
- Cerophysa viridipennis Jacoby, 1884
- Cerophysa vitiensis Bryant, 1941
- Cerophysa wallacii Baly, 1877
- Cerophysa warisan Mohamedsaid, 2003
