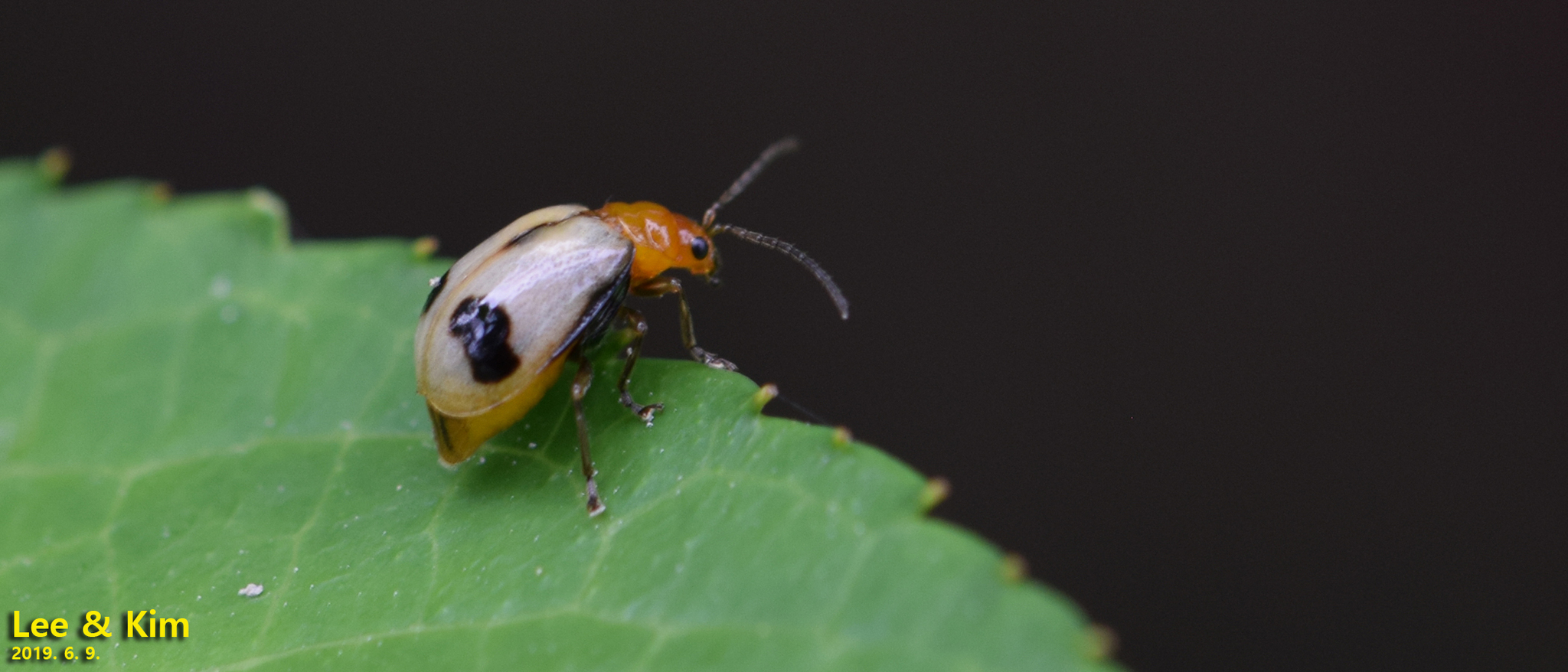
- Paridea angulicollis, South Korea

Scientific classification
- Kingdom: Animalia
- Phylum: Arthropoda
- Clade: Pancrustacea
- Class: Insecta
- Order: Coleoptera
- Suborder: Polyphaga
- Infraorder: Cucujiformia
- Family: Chrysomelidae
- Subfamily: Galerucinae
- Tribe: Luperini
- Subtribe: Aulacophorina
- Genus: Paridea; Baly, 1886

Synonyms
- Paraulaca Baly, 1888; Carapaula Chûjô, 1962; Neosastra Abdullah & Qureshi, 1968

= Paridea =

Genus of leaf beetles

Paridea is a genus of skeletonizing leaf beetles in the family Chrysomelidae. There are more than 80 described species in Paridea. They are found in Indomalaya and the Palearctic.

== Species ==
These 62 species, among others, belong to the genus Paridea:

- Paridea angulicollis (Motschulsky, 1853)
- Paridea avicauda (Laboissiere, 1930)
- Paridea bengalica Medvedev & Samoderzhenkov, 1998
- Paridea bhutanensis Kimoto, 1977
- Paridea bifurcata Jacoby, 1892
- Paridea biplagiata (Fairmaire, 1889)
- Paridea brachycornuta Yang, 1993
- Paridea breva Gressitt & Kimoto, 1963
- Paridea costallifera Yang, 1991
- Paridea costata (Chujo, 1935)
- Paridea crenata Yang, 1993
- Paridea cyanea Yang in Yang, 1992
- Paridea cyanipennis (Chujo, 1935)
- Paridea darjeelingensis Takizawa, 1990
- Paridea dohertyi (Maulik, 1936)
- Paridea epipleuralis (Chen, 1942)
- Paridea euryptera Yang, 1991
- Paridea fasciata Laboissiere, 1932
- Paridea flavipennis (Laboissiere, 1930)
- Paridea flavipoda Yang, 1991
- Paridea foveipennis Jacoby, 1892
- Paridea fujiana Yang, 1991
- Paridea fulva Kimoto, 1977
- Paridea fusca Yang, 1991
- Paridea glyphea Yang, 1993
- Paridea grandifolia Yang, 1991
- Paridea hirtipes Chen & Jiang, 1981
- Paridea houjayi Lee & Bezděk, 2014
- Paridea kaoi Lee & Bezděk, 2014
- Paridea lateralis Medvedev & Samoderzhenkov, 1989
- Paridea libita Yang, 1991
- Paridea livida Duvivier, 1892
- Paridea mimica Medvedev & Samoderzhenkov, 1998
- Paridea monticola (Gressitt & Kimoto, 1963)
- Paridea nepalica Medvedev & Samoderzhenkov, 1998
- Paridea nigra Yang, 1992
- Paridea nigricaudata Yang, 1991
- Paridea nigrimaculata Yang, 1991
- Paridea nigrimarginata Yang, 1991
- Paridea nigrocephala (Laboissiere, 1930)
- Paridea octomaculata (Baly, 1886)
- Paridea oculata Laboissiere, 1930
- Paridea pallida Bryant, 1954
- Paridea perplexa (Baly, 1879)
- Paridea plauta Yang, 1991
- Paridea quadrimaculata Kimoto, 2004
- Paridea recava Yang, 1991
- Paridea ruficollis Jacoby, 1892
- Paridea sancta Yang, 1991
- Paridea sauteri (Chûjô, 1935)
- Paridea sexmaculata (Laboissiere, 1930)
- Paridea sichuana Yang, 1991
- Paridea sikkimia Laboissiere, 1932
- Paridea sinensis (Laboissiere, 1930)
- Paridea taiwana (Chûjô, 1935)
- Paridea terminata Yang, 1991
- Paridea testacea (Gressitt & Kimoto, 1963)
- Paridea tetraspilota (Hope, 1831)
- Paridea transversofaciata (Laboissiere, 1930)
- Paridea tuberculata (Gressitt & Kimoto, 1963)
- Paridea unifasciata Jacoby, 1892
- Paridea yunnana Yang, 1991
