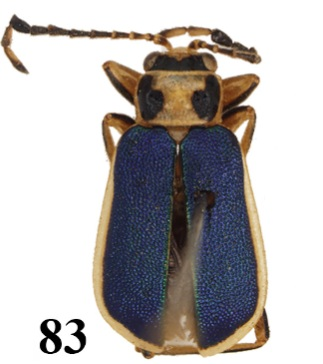

Scientific classification
- Kingdom: Animalia
- Phylum: Arthropoda
- Clade: Pancrustacea
- Class: Insecta
- Order: Coleoptera
- Suborder: Polyphaga
- Infraorder: Cucujiformia
- Family: Chrysomelidae
- Tribe: Luperini
- Subtribe: Diabroticina
- Genus: Buckibrotica; Bechyné & Bechyné, 1969
- Species: B. cinctipennis

Binomial name
- Buckibrotica cinctipennis (Baly, 1886)

Synonyms
- Diabrotica cinctipennis Baly, 1886

= Buckibrotica =

Genus of beetles

Buckibrotica is a genus of leaf beetles in the family Chrysomelidae. The genus is monotypic, being represented by the single species , Buckibrotica cinctipennis, which is found in South America.
