= Interbrotica =

Scientific classification
- Kingdom: Animalia
- Phylum: Arthropoda
- Clade: Pancrustacea
- Class: Insecta
- Order: Coleoptera
- Suborder: Polyphaga
- Infraorder: Cucujiformia
- Family: Chrysomelidae
- Tribe: Luperini
- Subtribe: Diabroticina
- Genus: Interbrotica; Bechyné & Bechyné, 1965

Genus of leaf beetles

Interbrotica is a genus of beetles belonging to the family Chrysomelidae.

== Species ==
- Interbrotica desiderata Bechyne & Bechyne, 1965
