= Bryobates =

Scientific classification
- Kingdom: Animalia
- Phylum: Arthropoda
- Clade: Pancrustacea
- Class: Insecta
- Order: Coleoptera
- Suborder: Polyphaga
- Infraorder: Cucujiformia
- Family: Chrysomelidae
- Tribe: Luperini
- Subtribe: Luperina
- Genus: Bryobates; Broun, 1886

Genus of leaf beetles

Bryobates is a genus of beetles belonging to the family Chrysomelidae.

== Species ==
- Bryobates aeratus Broun, 1914
- Bryobates coniformis Broun, 1886
- Bryobates nigricans Broun, 1914
- Bryobates rugidorsis Broun, 1917
