= Parexosoma =

Scientific classification
- Kingdom: Animalia
- Phylum: Arthropoda
- Clade: Pancrustacea
- Class: Insecta
- Order: Coleoptera
- Suborder: Polyphaga
- Infraorder: Cucujiformia
- Family: Chrysomelidae
- Tribe: Luperini
- Subtribe: Luperina
- Genus: Parexosoma; Laboissière, 1932

Synonyms
- Bijukta Maulik, 1936

Genus of leaf beetles

Parexosoma is a genus of beetles belonging to the family Chrysomelidae.

== Species ==
- Parexosoma beeneni
- Parexosoma biru
- Parexosoma cuprescens
- Parexosoma flaviventre (Baly, 1878)
- Parexosoma langeri
- Parexosoma mahsuri
- Parexosoma metallicum (Bryant, 1954)
- Parexosoma nigripenne
- Parexosoma poringica
