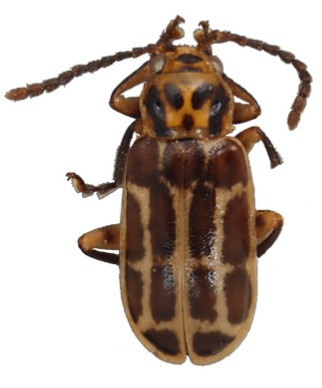

Scientific classification
- Kingdom: Animalia
- Phylum: Arthropoda
- Clade: Pancrustacea
- Class: Insecta
- Order: Coleoptera
- Suborder: Polyphaga
- Infraorder: Cucujiformia
- Family: Chrysomelidae
- Tribe: Luperini
- Subtribe: Diabroticina
- Genus: Anisobrotica; Bechyné & Bechyné, 1969

= Anisobrotica =

Genus of leaf beetles

Anisobrotica is a genus of beetles belonging to the family Chrysomelidae.

== Species ==
- Anisobrotica binisculpta (Bechyne & Bechyne, 1969)
- Anisobrotica donckieri (Baly, 1890)
- Anisobrotica notaticollis (Baly, 1889)
- Anisobrotica thesea (Bechyne, 1958)
