= Cassena (beetle) =

Scientific classification
- Kingdom: Animalia
- Phylum: Arthropoda
- Clade: Pancrustacea
- Class: Insecta
- Order: Coleoptera
- Suborder: Polyphaga
- Infraorder: Cucujiformia
- Family: Chrysomelidae
- Tribe: Luperini
- Subtribe: Luperina
- Genus: Cassena; Weise, 1892

Synonyms
- Euphyma Baly, 1879; Solenia Jacoby, 1886; Solephyma Maulik, 1936; Taphinellina Maulik, 1936

Genus of leaf beetles

Cassena is a genus of beetles belonging to the family Chrysomelidae.

== Species ==
- Cassena aeneipennis (Laboissiere, 1932)
- Cassena albertisi (Jacoby, 1892)
- Cassena alticoides (Gressitt & Kimoto, 1963)
- Cassena antennata Takizawa, 1988
- Cassena apicalis (Bryant, 1954)
- Cassena apicicornis (Laboissiere, 1932)
- Cassena aurensis (Jacoby, 1886)
- Cassena bicolor (Gressitt & Kimoto, 1963)
- Cassena brooksi Bryant, 1962
- Cassena caerulea (Jacoby, 1894)
- Cassena celebensis (Jacoby, 1886)
- Cassena chapuisi (Jacoby, 1886)
- Cassena chessmanae Bryant, 1962
- Cassena collaris (Baly, 1879)
- Cassena concolor Bryant, 1962
- Cassena cowleyi (Blackburn, 1896)
- Cassena dilaticollis (Jacoby, 1894)
- Cassena elongata (Jacoby, 1894)
- Cassena femorata (Jacoby, 1904)
- Cassena flavicollis Bryant, 1962
- Cassena indica (Jacoby, 1889)
- Cassena intergricollis (Jacoby, 1892)
- Cassena intermedia (Jacoby, 1904)
- Cassena laevicollis (Jacoby, 1886)
- Cassena leopldi Laboissiere, 1932
- Cassena leyteana Medvedev, 1995
- Cassena montana Bryant, 1962
- Cassena mysolensis Weise, 1922
- Cassena ocellata (Gressitt & Kimoto, 1963)
- Cassena oculata Laboissiere, 1934
- Cassena punctata (Laboissiere, 1932)
- Cassena punctatissima (Jacoby, 1894)
- Cassena ribbei (Weise, 1892)
- Cassena sasajii Kimoto, 1969
- Cassena sulcicollis Laboissiere, 1932
- Cassena suturalis Kimoto, 1989
- Cassena terminalis (Gressitt & Kimoto, 1963)
- Cassena terminata (Jacoby, 1894)
- Cassena tinkhami (Gressitt & Kimoto, 1963)
- Cassena tonkinensis Weise, 1922
- Cassena tricolor (Gressitt & Kimoto, 1963)
- Cassena uniformis (Bryant, 1954)
- Cassena vietnamica Kimoto, 1989
- Cassena vorax (Weise, 1908)
- Cassena wallacei Bryant, 1962
