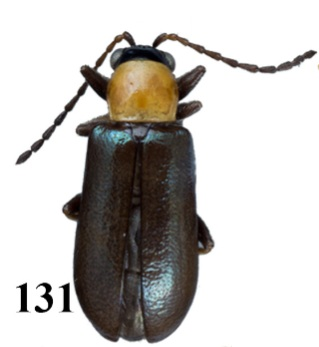

Scientific classification
- Kingdom: Animalia
- Phylum: Arthropoda
- Clade: Pancrustacea
- Class: Insecta
- Order: Coleoptera
- Suborder: Polyphaga
- Infraorder: Cucujiformia
- Family: Chrysomelidae
- Tribe: Luperini
- Subtribe: Luperina
- Genus: Lygistus; Wilcox, 1965
- Species: L. streptophallus

Binomial name
- Lygistus streptophallus Wilcox, 1965

= Lygistus =

Genus of beetles

Lygistus is a genus of leaf beetles in the family Chrysomelidae. There is one described species in Lygistus, Lygistus streptophallus, which is found in Arizona and nearby areas of Mexico.
