= Mindana =

Scientific classification
- Kingdom: Animalia
- Phylum: Arthropoda
- Clade: Pancrustacea
- Class: Insecta
- Order: Coleoptera
- Suborder: Polyphaga
- Infraorder: Cucujiformia
- Family: Chrysomelidae
- Tribe: Luperini
- Subtribe: Luperina
- Genus: Mindana; Allard, 1889

Genus of leaf beetles

Mindana is a genus of beetles belonging to the family Chrysomelidae.

== Species ==
- Mindana apicalis Allard, 1889
- Mindana cyanipennis Allard, 1889
- Mindana dimidiata Allard, 1889
- Mindana femoralis Allard, 1889
- Mindana nigripes Allard, 1889
- Mindana ruficollis Allard, 1889
- Mindana substriata Medvedev, 1995
- Mindana vittata Allard, 1889
