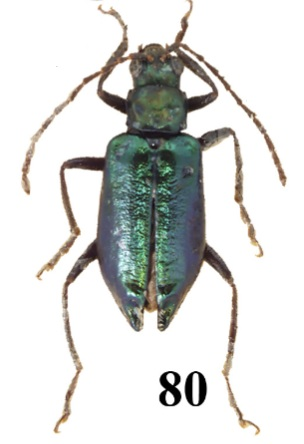

Scientific classification
- Kingdom: Animalia
- Phylum: Arthropoda
- Clade: Pancrustacea
- Class: Insecta
- Order: Coleoptera
- Suborder: Polyphaga
- Infraorder: Cucujiformia
- Family: Chrysomelidae
- Genus: Pseudodiabrotica
- Species: P. metallica

Binomial name
- Pseudodiabrotica metallica Jacoby, 1892

= Pseudodiabrotica metallica =

Species of beetle

Pseudodiabrotica metallica is a species of beetle of the family Chrysomelidae. It is found in Mexico.
