= Eubeiratia =

Scientific classification
- Kingdom: Animalia
- Phylum: Arthropoda
- Clade: Pancrustacea
- Class: Insecta
- Order: Coleoptera
- Suborder: Polyphaga
- Infraorder: Cucujiformia
- Family: Chrysomelidae
- Tribe: Luperini
- Subtribe: Luperina
- Genus: Eubeiratia; Laboissière, 1931

Genus of leaf beetles

Eubeiratia is a genus of beetles belonging to the family Chrysomelidae.

== Species ==
- Eubeiratia lesnei Laboissiere, 1931
