= Allastena =

Scientific classification
- Kingdom: Animalia
- Phylum: Arthropoda
- Clade: Pancrustacea
- Class: Insecta
- Order: Coleoptera
- Suborder: Polyphaga
- Infraorder: Cucujiformia
- Family: Chrysomelidae
- Tribe: Luperini
- Subtribe: Luperina
- Genus: Allastena; Broun, 1893

Genus of leaf beetles

Allastena is a genus of beetles belonging to the family Chrysomelidae.

== Species ==
- Allastena eminens Broun, 1917
- Allastena nitida Broun, 1893
- Allastena piliventris Broun, 1915
- Allastena quadrata Broun, 1893
