= Heterochele =

Scientific classification
- Kingdom: Animalia
- Phylum: Arthropoda
- Clade: Pancrustacea
- Class: Insecta
- Order: Coleoptera
- Suborder: Polyphaga
- Infraorder: Cucujiformia
- Family: Chrysomelidae
- Tribe: Luperini
- Subtribe: Diabroticina
- Genus: Heterochele; Viswajyothi & Clark, 2021

Genus of leaf beetles

Heterochele is a genus of beetles belonging to the family Chrysomelidae.

== Species ==
- Heterochele actias Viswajyothi & Clark, 2021
- Heterochele signiferoides Viswajyothi & Clark, 2021
