= Strobiderus =

Scientific classification
- Kingdom: Animalia
- Phylum: Arthropoda
- Clade: Pancrustacea
- Class: Insecta
- Order: Coleoptera
- Suborder: Polyphaga
- Infraorder: Cucujiformia
- Family: Chrysomelidae
- Tribe: Luperini
- Subtribe: Luperina
- Genus: Strobiderus; Jacoby, 1884

Synonyms
- Syoplia Jacoby, 1886

Genus of leaf beetles

Strobiderus is a genus of beetles belonging to the family Chrysomelidae.

== Species ==
- Strobiderus aequatorialis Allard, 1890
- Strobiderus albescens (Motschulsky, 1866)
- Strobiderus bipubescens
- Strobiderus brunneus Allard, 1889
- Strobiderus carayoni Berti, 1986
- Strobiderus excavatus Jacoby, 1884
- Strobiderus fulvus
- Strobiderus guiganus Yang, 1992
- Strobiderus impressus Laboissiere, 1919
- Strobiderus jacobyi Weise, 1902
- Strobiderus javenensis (Jacoby, 1886)
- Strobiderus laevicollis Allard, 1889
- Strobiderus nigripennis (Jacoby, 1900)
- Strobiderus orissaensis Basu & Halder, 1987
- Strobiderus pygidialis (Jacoby, 1896)
- Strobiderus rufus Allard, 1889
- Strobiderus sulawesianus
- Strobiderus vietnamicus
- Strobiderus xianganus Yang in Yang, 1992
