= Doryscus =

Scientific classification
- Kingdom: Animalia
- Phylum: Arthropoda
- Clade: Pancrustacea
- Class: Insecta
- Order: Coleoptera
- Suborder: Polyphaga
- Infraorder: Cucujiformia
- Family: Chrysomelidae
- Tribe: Luperini
- Subtribe: Luperina
- Genus: Doryscus; Jacoby, 1887

Genus of leaf beetles

Doryscus is a genus of beetles belonging to the family Chrysomelidae.

== Species ==
- Doryscus chujoi Takizawa, 1978
- Doryscus indochinensis Lee, 2017
- Doryscus krausi Lee, 2017
- Doryscus kubani Lee, 2017
- Doryscus geiseri Lee, 2017
- Doryscus nepalensis Lee, 2017
- Doryscus luzonensis Lee, 2017
- Doryscus mindanaoensis Lee, 2017
- Doryscus niger Medvedev & Sprecher-Uebersax, 1998
- Doryscus barclayi Lee, 2017
- Doryscus boreri Lee, 2017
- Doryscus javanensis Lee, 2017
- Doryscus scapus Mohamedsaid, 1999
- Doryscus sumatrensis Lee, 2017
- Doryscus testaceus Jacoby, 1887
- Doryscus varians (Gressitt & Kimoto, 1963)
  - = Trichobalya varians Gressitt & Kimoto, 1963
  - = Doryscus marginicollis Jiang, 1992
  - = Doryscus nigricollis Jiang, 1992
- Doryscus wangi Lee, 2017
