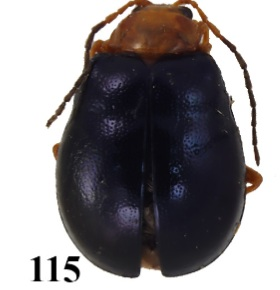

Scientific classification
- Kingdom: Animalia
- Phylum: Arthropoda
- Clade: Pancrustacea
- Class: Insecta
- Order: Coleoptera
- Suborder: Polyphaga
- Infraorder: Cucujiformia
- Family: Chrysomelidae
- Genus: Trachyscelida
- Species: T. venezuelensis

Binomial name
- Trachyscelida venezuelensis (Bechyne, 1958)

Synonyms
- Racenisa venezuelensis Bechyné, 1958

= Trachyscelida venezuelensis =

Species of beetle

Trachyscelida venezuelensis is a species of beetle of the family Chrysomelidae. It is found in Venezuela.
