= Pseudoscelida =

Scientific classification
- Kingdom: Animalia
- Phylum: Arthropoda
- Clade: Pancrustacea
- Class: Insecta
- Order: Coleoptera
- Suborder: Polyphaga
- Infraorder: Cucujiformia
- Family: Chrysomelidae
- Tribe: Luperini
- Subtribe: Luperina
- Genus: Pseudoscelida; Jacoby, 1894

Genus of leaf beetles

Pseudoscelida is a genus of beetles belonging to the family Chrysomelidae.

== Species ==
- Pseudoscelida apicicornis Jacoby, 1896
- Pseudoscelida fulvicornis Jacoby, 1903
- Pseudoscelida indica Jacoby, 1903
- Pseudoscelida jacobsoni Weise, 1926
- Pseudoscelida pallida Jacoby, 1896
