= Kanarella =

Scientific classification
- Kingdom: Animalia
- Phylum: Arthropoda
- Clade: Pancrustacea
- Class: Insecta
- Order: Coleoptera
- Suborder: Polyphaga
- Infraorder: Cucujiformia
- Family: Chrysomelidae
- Tribe: Luperini
- Subtribe: Luperina
- Genus: Kanarella; Jacoby, 1896

Synonyms
- Cneoranella Maulik, 1936

Genus of leaf beetles

Kanarella is a genus of beetles belonging to the family Chrysomelidae.

== Species ==
- Kanarella pallida (Jacoby, 1887)
- Kanarella unicolor Jacoby, 1896
