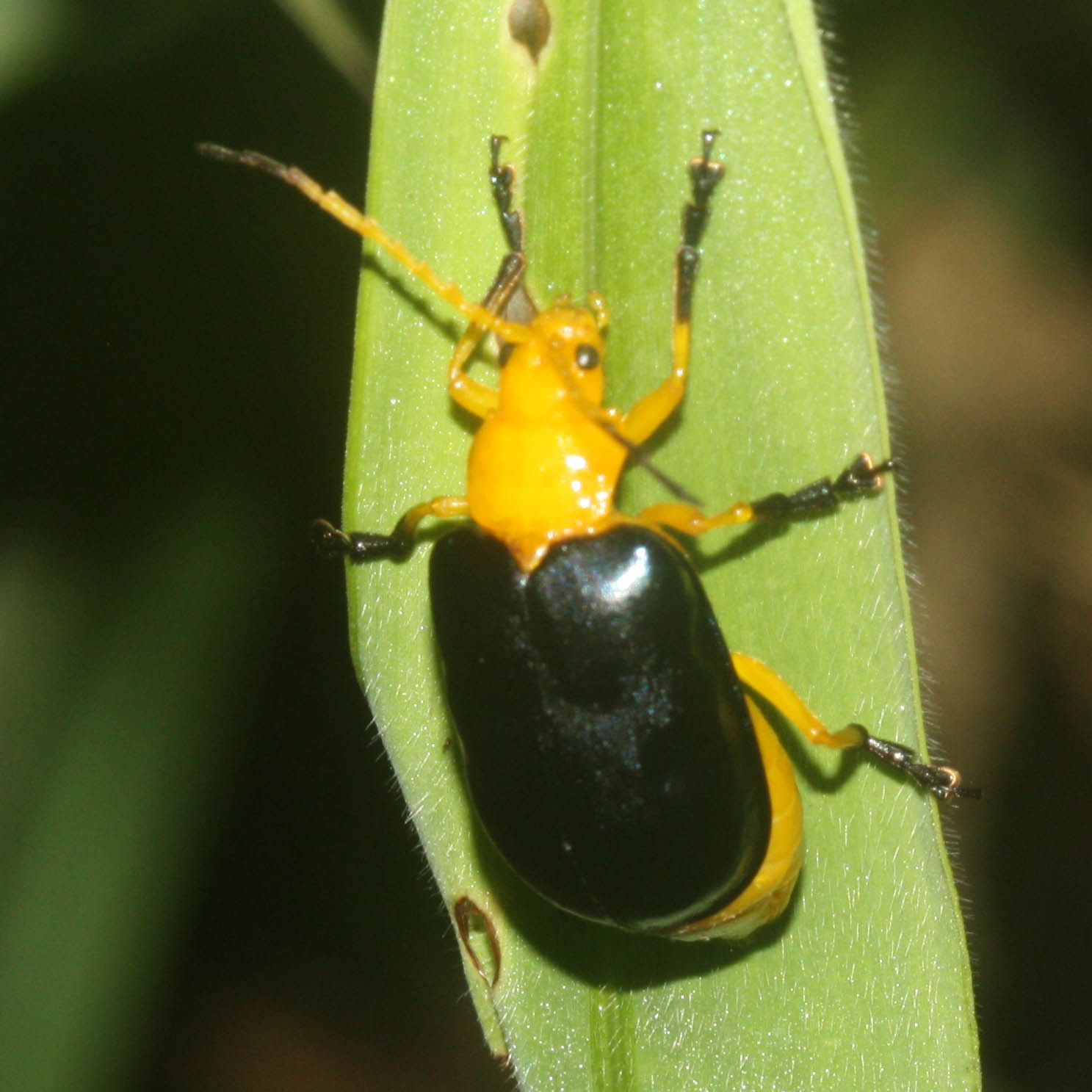
- Agetocera, China

Scientific classification
- Kingdom: Animalia
- Phylum: Arthropoda
- Clade: Pancrustacea
- Class: Insecta
- Order: Coleoptera
- Suborder: Polyphaga
- Infraorder: Cucujiformia
- Family: Chrysomelidae
- Subfamily: Galerucinae
- Tribe: Luperini
- Subtribe: Aulacophorina
- Genus: Agetocera; Hope, 1840

Synonyms
- Aegelocerus Hope, 1831; Agetocera Hope, 1840

= Agetocera =

Genus of leaf beetles

Agetocera is a genus of skeletonizing leaf beetles in the family Chrysomelidae. There are more than 25 described species in Agetocera. They are found in Indomalaya and the Palaearctic, especially in China.

== Species ==
These 28 species belong to the genus Agetocera:

- Agetocera abdominalis Jiang, 1992 (China)
- Agetocera biclava Zhang & Yang, 2005 (China)
- Agetocera birmanica Jacoby, 1891 (Burma)
- Agetocera carinicornis Chen, 1964 (China)
- Agetocera chapana Laboissiere, 1929 (China, Vietnam, Burma)
- Agetocera choui Lee, Bezdek & Staines, 2010 (Taiwan)
- Agetocera cyanipennis Yang, 2001 (China)
- Agetocera deformicornis Laboissiere, 1927 (China, Vietnam)
- Agetocera discedens Weise, 1922 (Taiwan)
- Agetocera duporti Laboissiere, 1927 (Vietnam)
- Agetocera femoralis Chen, 1942 (China)
- Agetocera filicornis Laboissiere, 1927 (China, Vietnam)
- Agetocera flaviventris Jacoby, 1879 (India, Burma)
- Agetocera hopei Baly, 1865 (China, Indomalaya)
- Agetocera huatungensis Lee, Bezdek & Staines, 2010 (Taiwan)
- Agetocera lobicornis Baly, 1865 (India, Burma)
- Agetocera manipuria Maulik, 1932
- Agetocera mirabilis (Hope, 1831) (China, Indomalaya)
- Agetocera nigripennis Laboissiere, 1927 (China, Vietnam)
- Agetocera orientalis Weise, 1902 (Vietnam)
- Agetocera parva Chen, 1964 (China)
- Agetocera silva Bezděk, 2009
- Agetocera similis Chen, 1997 (China)
- Agetocera sokolovi Medvedev, 1981 (Vietnam)
- Agetocera taiwana Chujo, 1962 (Taiwan)
- Agetocera yuae Lee, Bezdek & Staines, 2010 (Taiwan)
- Agetocera yunnana Chen, 1964 (China)
