= Beiratia =

Scientific classification
- Kingdom: Animalia
- Phylum: Arthropoda
- Clade: Pancrustacea
- Class: Insecta
- Order: Coleoptera
- Suborder: Polyphaga
- Infraorder: Cucujiformia
- Family: Chrysomelidae
- Tribe: Luperini
- Subtribe: Luperina
- Genus: Beiratia; Jacoby, 1906

Genus of leaf beetles

Beiratia is a genus of leaf beetles belonging to the family Chrysomelidae.

== Species ==
- Beiratia inornata Jacoby, 1906
- Beiratia pusilla Weise, 1909
