= Shairella =

Scientific classification
- Kingdom: Animalia
- Phylum: Arthropoda
- Clade: Pancrustacea
- Class: Insecta
- Order: Coleoptera
- Suborder: Polyphaga
- Infraorder: Cucujiformia
- Family: Chrysomelidae
- Tribe: Luperini
- Subtribe: Luperina
- Genus: Shairella; Chûjô, 1962

Genus of leaf beetles

Shairella is a genus of beetles belonging to the family Chrysomelidae.

== Species ==
- Shairella aeneipennis Chujo, 1962
- Shairella caerulea
- Shairella cheni
- Shairella chungi
- Shairella guoi
- Shairella motienensis
- Shairella quadricostata
- Shairella tsoui
