= Platybrotica =

Scientific classification
- Kingdom: Animalia
- Phylum: Arthropoda
- Clade: Pancrustacea
- Class: Insecta
- Order: Coleoptera
- Suborder: Polyphaga
- Infraorder: Cucujiformia
- Family: Chrysomelidae
- Tribe: Luperini
- Subtribe: Diabroticina
- Genus: Platybrotica; Cabrera & Cabrera Walsh, 2004
- Species: P. misionensis

Binomial name
- Platybrotica misionensis Cabrera & Cabrera Walsh, 2004

Genus of beetles

Platybrotica is a genus of leaf beetles in the family Chrysomelidae. The genus is monotypic, being represented by the single species Platybrotica misionensis, which is found in Argentina.
