= Halysacantha =

Scientific classification
- Kingdom: Animalia
- Phylum: Arthropoda
- Clade: Pancrustacea
- Class: Insecta
- Order: Coleoptera
- Suborder: Polyphaga
- Infraorder: Cucujiformia
- Family: Chrysomelidae
- Tribe: Luperini
- Subtribe: Aulacophorina
- Genus: Halysacantha; Laboissière, 1922

Genus of leaf beetles

Halysacantha is a genus of beetles belonging to the family Chrysomelidae.

== Species ==
- Halysacantha weisei (Jacoby, 1899)
