= Luperini (beetle) =

- Taumacera facialis

Scientific classification
- Kingdom: Animalia
- Phylum: Arthropoda
- Clade: Pancrustacea
- Class: Insecta
- Order: Coleoptera
- Suborder: Polyphaga
- Infraorder: Cucujiformia
- Family: Chrysomelidae
- Subfamily: Galerucinae
- Tribe: Luperini; Gistel, 1848

Synonyms
- Luperiidae Gistel, 1848; Luperites Chapuis, 1875; Luperini Leng, 1920; Aulacophorites Chapuis, 1875; Aulacophorina Laboissière, 1934; Diabroticites Chapuis, 1875; Diabroticini Leng, 1920; Cerotomites Chapuis, 1875; Cerotomini Leng, 1920; Platyxanthites Chapuis, 1875; Platyxanthinae Jacoby, 1884b; Theopeites Chapuis, 1875; Scelidites Chapuis, 1875; Scelidinae Jacoby, 1884a; Scelidini Leng, 1920; Phyllobroticites Chapuis, 1875; Phyllobroticini Leng, 1920; Agetocerites Chapuis, 1875; Mimastrites Chapuis, 1875; Mimastrinae Jacoby, 1884a; Ornithognathites Chapuis, 1875; Ornithognathinae Harold, 1877; Monoleptites Chapuis, 1875; Monoleptinae Jacoby, 1884a; Monoleptini Weise, 1924; Monoleptina Wilcox, 1965; Cerophysites Chapuis, 1875; Androlyperites Horn, 1893; Androlyperini Leng, 1920; Phyllecthrites Horn, 1893; Rhaphidopalpini Weise, 1902; Idacanthites Laboissière, 1921; Hyperacanthites Laboissière, 1924; Megalognathites Laboissière, 1926; Exosomites Wilcox, 1965; Trachyscelidites Wilcox, 1972; Adoxiites Wilcox, 1973; Eumeleptites Wilcox, 1973; Xenodites Wilcox, 1973; Doryscites Wilcox, 1973

Tribe of beetles

Luperini is a tribe of skeletonizing leaf beetles in the family Chrysomelidae. There are about 300 genera in the Luperini, placed in three subtribes.

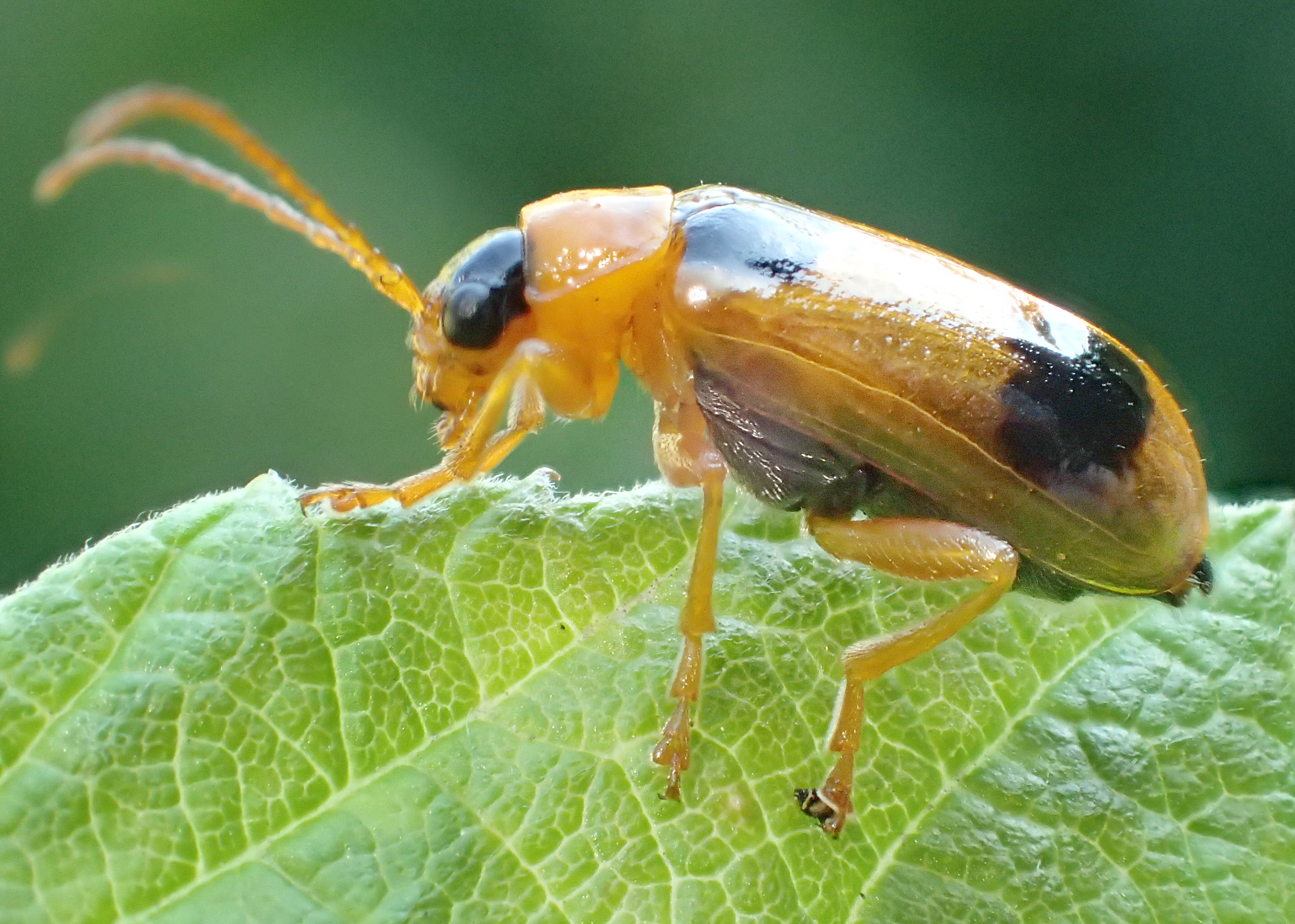
Phyllobrotica quadrimaculata

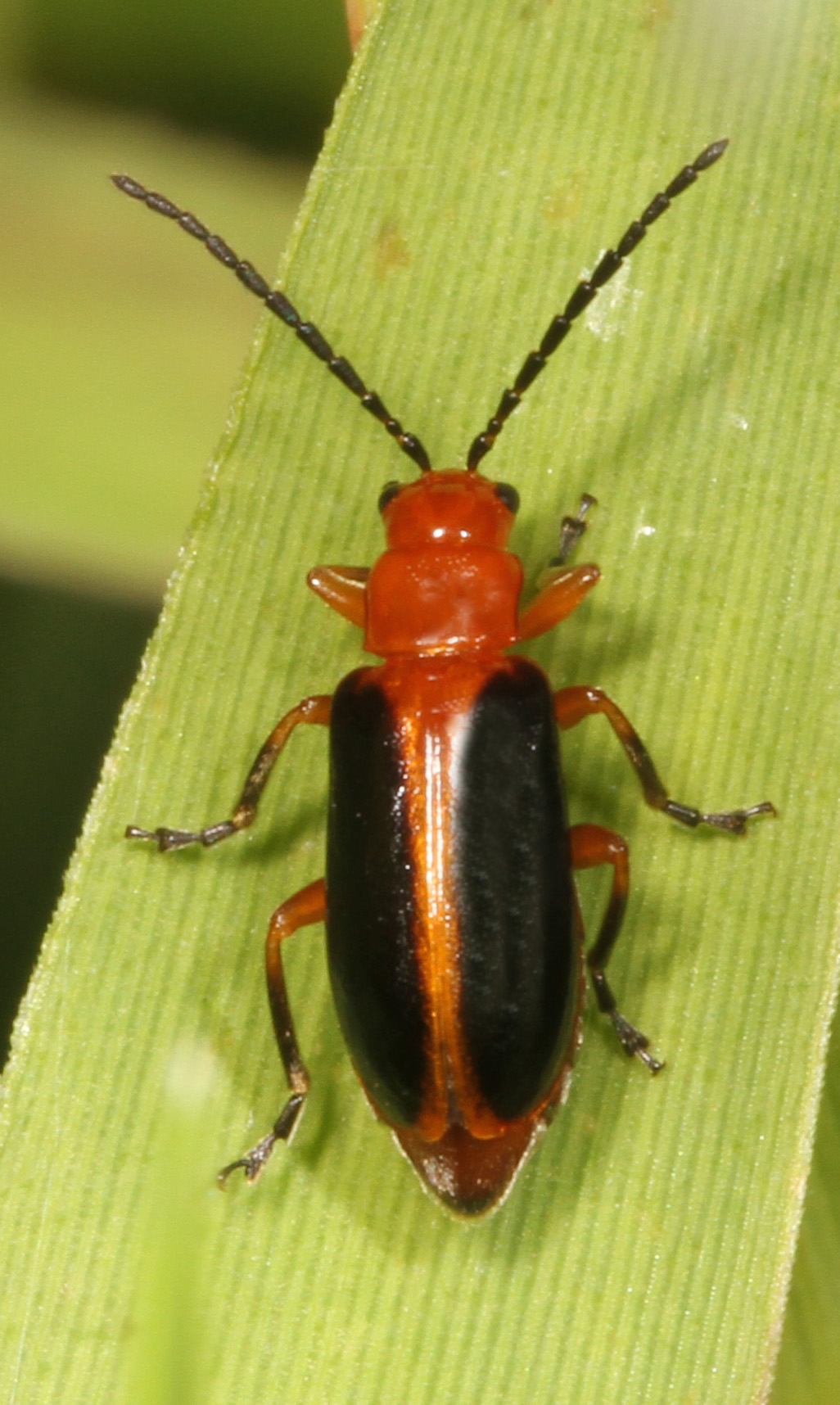
Phyllobrotica limbata

== Genera ==
The genera below belong to the tribe Luperini:

=== Subtribe Aulacophorina ===
Chapuis, 1875

- Section Aulacophorites:
1. Agetocera Hope, 1831
2. Asbecesta
3. Aulacophora Chevrolat in Dejean, 1836
4. Candezoides
5. Diacantha
6. Erythrobapta
7. Hatita
8. Jacobya
9. Jacobyanella
10. Lamprocopa
11. Leptaulaca Weise, 1902
12. Mahutia
13. Mimagitocera Maulik, 1936
14. Neomahutia
15. Papuania
16. Paragetocera Laboissière, 1929
17. Parasbecesta
18. Paridea Baly, 1886
19. Pseudocophora Jacoby, 1884
20. Sonchia
- Section Prosmidiites:
1. Anatela
2. Austrotella
3. Bacteriaspis
4. Cannonia
5. Halysacantha
6. Laetana
7. Laetiacantha
8. Oorlogia
9. Phyllobroticella
10. Prosmidia
11. Samoria
12. Shungwayana
13. Spilonotella
14. Taenala

=== Subtribe Diabroticina ===
Auth. Chapuis, 1875

- Section Cerotomites:
1. Cerotoma Chevrolat in Dejean, 1836
2. Cyclotrypema Blake, 1966
3. Eccoptopsis
4. Eucerotoma
5. Hyperbrotica
6. Hystiopsis
7. Interbrotica
8. Metrobrotica
9. Neobrotica Jacoby, 1887
10. Potamobrotica
11. Rachicephala
- Section Diabroticites:
1. Acalymma Barber, 1947
2. Amphelasma Barber, 1947
3. Anisobrotica Bechyné & Bechyné, 1970
4. Aristobrotica Bechyné, 1956
5. Buckibrotica Bechyné & Bechyné, 1970
6. Cochabamba Bechyné, 1955
7. Cornubrotica Bechyné & Bechyné, 1970
8. Diabrotica Chevrolat in Dejean, 1836
9. Ensiforma Jacoby, 1876
10. Gynandrobrotica Bechyné, 1955
11. Isotes Weise, 1922
12. Microbrotica
13. Palmaria Bechyné, 1956
14. Paranapiacaba J. Bechyné, 1958
15. Paratriarius Schaeffer, 1906
16. Platybrotica Cabrera & Cabrera Walsh, 2004
17. Prathapanius Viswajyothi & Clark, 2020
18. Pseudodiabrotica Jacoby, 1892
19. Zischkaita Bechyné, 1956
- Section Phyllecthrites:
1. Coronabrotica Moura, 2010
2. Deinocladus Jacoby, 1892
3. Ectmesopus Jacoby, 1892
4. Heterochele Viswajyothi & Clark, 2021
5. Leptonesiotes Jacoby, 1892
6. Luperosoma Jacoby, 1891
7. Oroetes Jacoby, 1892
8. Parabrotica Jacoby, 1892
9. Phyllecthris Dejean, 1836
10. Platymorpha Jacoby, 1892
11. Porechontes Jacoby, 1892
12. Romanita Bechyné, 1957
13. Simopsis Blake, 1966
14. Trachyelytron Viswajyothi & Clark, 2022
15. Trichobrotica
- Section Trachyscelidites:
1. Trachyscelida Horn, 1893

=== Subtribe Luperina ===
- Section Adoxiites:
1. Adoxia
2. Allastena
3. Astena
4. Bryobates
5. Kanarella
6. Khasia
7. Madurasia
8. Marseulia
9. Medythia Jacoby, 1886
10. Microlepta
11. Neodrana
12. Neorupilia
13. Palaeosastra
14. Prasyptera
15. Shaira Maulik, 1936
16. Shairella Chujo, 1962
17. Synodita Chapuis, 1875
18. Tschitscherinula
- Section Cerophysites:
1. Cerophysa Chevrolat in Dejean, 1836
2. Cerophysella Laboissière, 1930
3. Mindana
4. Pseudoscelida
- Section Doryscites:
1. Doryscus Jacoby, 1887
2. Strobiderus Jacoby, 1884
3. Trichobalya Weise, 1890
- Section Eumeleptites:
1. Charaea Baly, 1878
2. Craniotectus
3. Erganoides
4. Eumelepta Jacoby, 1892
5. Nancita
6. Parexosoma Laboissière, 1932
- Section Exosomites:
1. Beiratia
2. Bipleura
3. Brachyphora Jacoby, 1890
4. Cassena Weise, 1892
5. Cneorane Baly, 1865
6. Cneoranidea Chen, 1942
7. Coeligetes
8. Cynortina
9. Eubeiratia
10. Exosoma
11. Falsoexosoma
12. Hemistus
13. Lesnella
14. Liroetis Weise, 1889 (= Siemssenius Weise, 1922 = Zangia Chen, 1976)
15. Malaconida
16. Microexosoma
17. Monocida
18. Niasia
19. Ootheca
20. Pimentelia
21. Sikkimia Duvivier, 1891
22. Sinoluperus Gressitt & Kimoto, 1963
23. Trichocneorane
24. Vitruvia
- Section Luperites:
1. Alopena
2. Anomalonyx
3. Dimalianella
4. Duvivieria
5. Epaenidea Gressitt & Kimoto, 1963
6. Fleutiauxia Laboissière, 1933
7. Haplotia
8. Hoplosaenidea Laboissière, 1933
9. Huillania
10. Hyphaenia Baly, 1865
11. Kanahiiphaga
12. Luisiadia
13. Luperus Muller, 1764
14. Mindorina
15. Palpaenidea
16. Palpoxena Baly, 1861
17. Protocoelocrania
18. Pseudaenidea
19. Pseudolognatha
20. Rohania
21. Ruwenzoria
22. Sardoides
23. Spilocephalus
24. Stenellina
25. Stenoplatys
26. Taumacera Thunberg, 1814
27. Theopea Baly, 1864
28. Theopella
29. Witteochaloenus
- Section Megalognathites:
1. Megalognatha
2. Pseudorupilia
- Section Monoleptites:
1. Abdullahius
2. Afrocandezea
3. Afrocrania
4. Afromaculepta
5. Afromegalepta
6. Afronaumannia
7. Afrorudolphia
8. Afrosoma
9. Afrotizea
10. Apteromicrus Chen & Jiang, 1981
11. Arcastes
12. Ashrafia
13. Atrachya Dejean, 1837
14. Barombiella Laboissière, 1931
15. Bicolorizea
16. Bonesioides
17. Bradamina
18. Calomicrus Dillwyn, 1829
19. Candezea
20. Candezeososia
21. Ceratocalymma
22. Chikatunolepta
23. Chinochya
24. Cneorella Medvedev & Dang, 1981
25. Cynortella
26. Desbordelepta
27. Epiluperodes
28. Euluperus
29. Eusattodera Schaeffer, 1906
30. Halinella
31. Leptomona
32. Lilophaea
33. Lomirana
34. Luperacantha
35. Luperodes
36. Macrima Baly, 1878
37. Metrioidea Fairmaire, 1881
38. Monolepta Chevrolat in Dejean, 1836
39. Monoleptinia
40. Monoleptocrania
41. Monoleptoides
42. Nadrana
43. Neobarombiella
44. Neochya
45. Neolepta
46. Nymphius
47. Ochralea
48. Orthoneolepta
49. Paleosepharia Laboissière, 1936
50. Panafrolepta
51. Paraneolepta
52. Priapina
53. Pseudikopista
54. Pseudosepharia Laboissière, 1936
55. Rubrarcastes
56. Trichosepharia Laboissière, 1936
57. Tsouchya
- Section Ornithognathites:
1. Crampelia
2. Dilinosa
3. Hallirhotius
4. Mellesia
5. Ornithognathus
- Section Phyllobroticites:
1. Euliroetis Ogloblin, 1936
2. Haplosomoides Duvivier, 1890
3. Hemygascelis
4. Hirtomimastra
5. Hoplasoma Jacoby, 1884
6. Japonitata Strand, 1922
7. Jolibrotica Lee & Bezděk, 2015
8. Konbirella
9. Mimastra Baly, 1865
10. Mimastrosoma
11. Phyllobrotica Chevrolat in Dejean, 1836
12. Pubibrotica
13. Sosibiella
14. Trichomimastra Weise, 1922
15. Xenarthracella
- Section Scelidites:
1. Aelianus
2. Agelopsis
3. Amplioluperus
4. Androlyperus Crotch, 1873
5. Carpiradialis
6. Clerotilia Jacoby, 1885
7. Cornuventer
8. Eustena
9. Galerudolphia
10. Geethaluperus
11. Hesperomorpha Ogloblin, 1936
12. Hildebrandtianella
13. Inbioluperus Clark, 1993
14. Keitheatus Wilcox, 1965
15. Lusingania
16. Lygistus Wilcox, 1965
17. Metacoryna Jacoby, 1888
18. Mexiluperus
19. Microscelida
20. Monoaster
21. Nymphius
22. Parantongila
23. Plagiasma
24. Protoleptonyx
25. Pseudoluperus Beller & Hatch, 1932
26. Pseudomalaxia
27. Pteleon Jacoby, 1888
28. Sakaramya
29. Scelida Chapuis, 1875
30. Scelidacne
31. Scelolyperus Crotch, 1874
32. Scruptoluperus
33. Synetocephalus Fall, 1910
34. Texiluperus
35. Triariodes
36. Triarius Jacoby, 1887
37. Yulenia
- Section Xenodites:
1. Paraplotes Laboissière, 1933
2. Phyllocleptis
3. Xenoda
- Not placed in section:
1. Afropachylepta
2. Borneotheopea
3. Doeberllepta
4. Dyolania
5. Hesperopenna
6. Kumbornia
7. Lanolepta Kimoto, 1991
8. Luperogala
9. Nepalolepta
10. Oosagitta
11. Oothecoides
12. Ootibia
13. Pseudotheopea
14. Sinoluperoides
15. Taiwanaenidea Kimoto, 1984
16. Taiwanoshaira
17. Xingeina Chen et al., 1987
