= Palaeosastra =

Scientific classification
- Kingdom: Animalia
- Phylum: Arthropoda
- Clade: Pancrustacea
- Class: Insecta
- Order: Coleoptera
- Suborder: Polyphaga
- Infraorder: Cucujiformia
- Family: Chrysomelidae
- Tribe: Luperini
- Subtribe: Luperina
- Genus: Palaeosastra; Jacoby, 1906

Genus of leaf beetles

Palaeosastra is a genus of beetles belonging to the family Chrysomelidae.

== Species ==
- Palaeosastra gracilicornis Jacoby, 1906
