= Pseudodiabrotica =

Scientific classification
- Kingdom: Animalia
- Phylum: Arthropoda
- Clade: Pancrustacea
- Class: Insecta
- Order: Coleoptera
- Suborder: Polyphaga
- Infraorder: Cucujiformia
- Family: Chrysomelidae
- Tribe: Luperini
- Subtribe: Diabroticina
- Genus: Pseudodiabrotica; Jacoby, 1892

Genus of leaf beetles

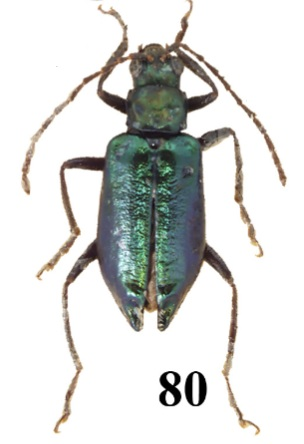
Pseudodiabrotica metallica

Pseudodiabrotica is a genus of beetles belonging to the family Chrysomelidae.

== Species ==
- Pseudodiabrotica metallica Jacoby, 1892
