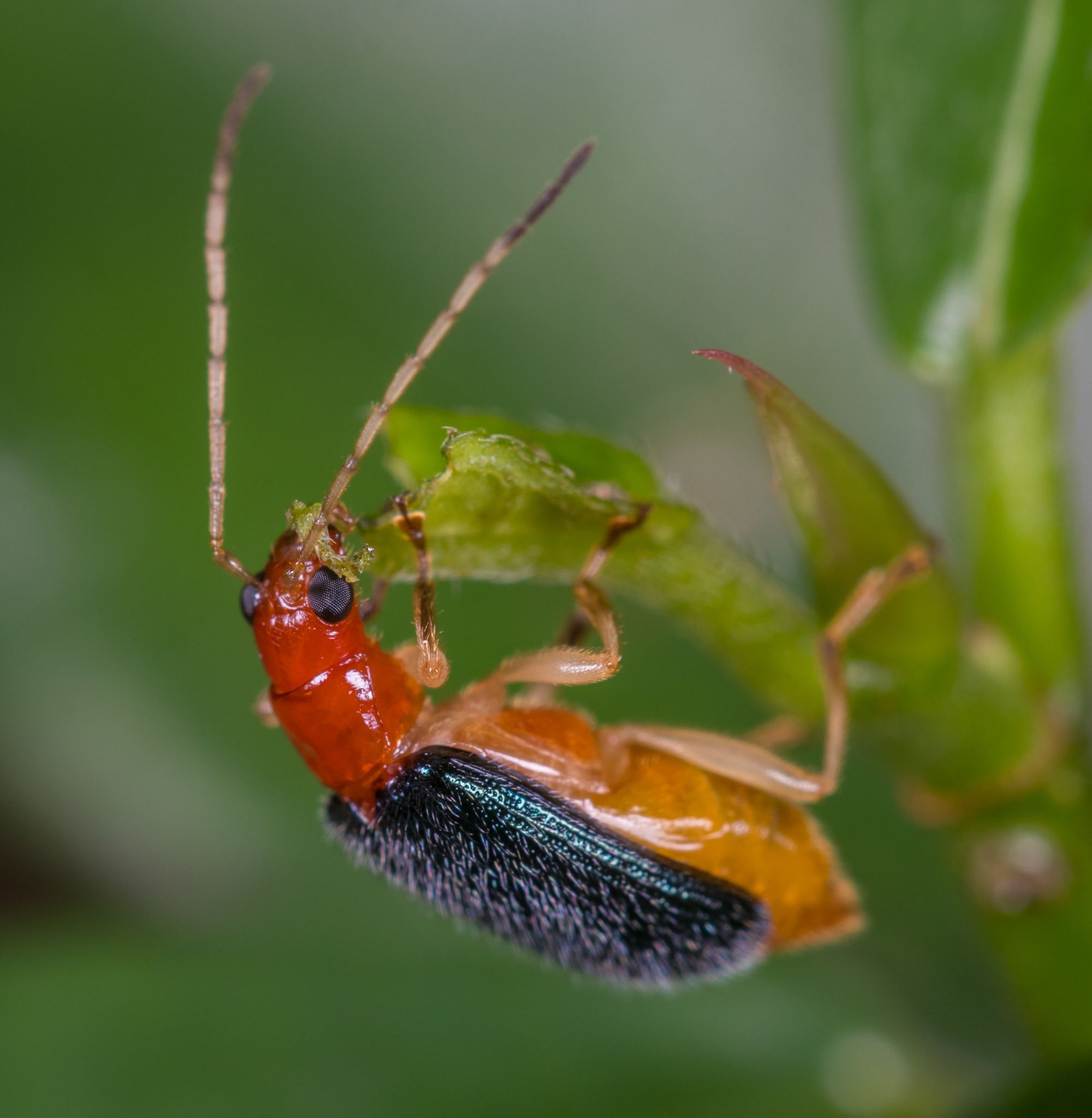
- Trichobalya bowringii, China

Scientific classification
- Kingdom: Animalia
- Phylum: Arthropoda
- Clade: Pancrustacea
- Class: Insecta
- Order: Coleoptera
- Suborder: Polyphaga
- Infraorder: Cucujiformia
- Family: Chrysomelidae
- Subfamily: Galerucinae
- Tribe: Luperini
- Subtribe: Luperina
- Genus: Trichobalya; Weise, 1924

Synonyms
- Trichidea Baly, 1890 (preocc.)

= Trichobalya =

Genus of leaf beetles

Trichobalya is a genus of skeletonizing leaf beetles in the family Chrysomelidae. There are at least three described species in Trichobalya. They are found in Indomalaya and the Palaearctic.

== Species ==
These species belong to the genus Trichobalya:

- Trichobalya apicalis Kimoto, 1982
- Trichobalya bowringii (Baly, 1890)
- Trichobalya golaris Laboissiere, 1936
- Trichobalya mouhoti Baly, 1890
- Trichobalya tiomanensis Mohamedsaid, 1999
- Trichobalya ventrituberculata Romantsov, 2020
