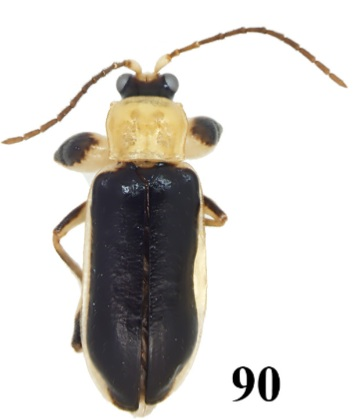

Scientific classification
- Kingdom: Animalia
- Phylum: Arthropoda
- Clade: Pancrustacea
- Class: Insecta
- Order: Coleoptera
- Suborder: Polyphaga
- Infraorder: Cucujiformia
- Family: Chrysomelidae
- Tribe: Luperini
- Subtribe: Diabroticina
- Genus: Prathapanius; Viswajyothi & Clark, 2020
- Species: P. fortis

Binomial name
- Prathapanius fortis Viswajyothi & Clark, 2020

= Prathapanius =

Genus of beetles

Prathapanius is a genus of leaf beetles in the family Chrysomelidae. There is one described species in Prathapanius, Prathapanius fortis, which is found in Ecuador.
