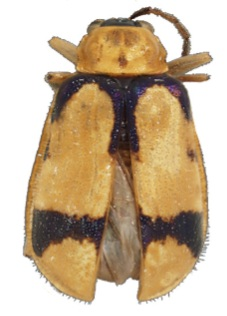

Scientific classification
- Kingdom: Animalia
- Phylum: Arthropoda
- Clade: Pancrustacea
- Class: Insecta
- Order: Coleoptera
- Suborder: Polyphaga
- Infraorder: Cucujiformia
- Family: Chrysomelidae
- Tribe: Luperini
- Subtribe: Diabroticina
- Genus: Zischkaita; Bechyné, 1956

= Zischkaita =

Genus of leaf beetles

Zischkaita is a genus of beetles belonging to the family Chrysomelidae.

== Species ==
- Zischkaita boliviensis Bechyne, 1956
- Zischkaita bucki (Bechyné & Springlova de Bechyné, 1962)
- Zischkaita caapura Moura, 2005
- Zischkaita jeronymia Bechyne, 1958
- Zischkaita pilifera (Weise, 1921)
- Zischkaita pubipennis Bechyne, 1958
- Zischkaita serrana Moura, 2003
