= Cerophysella =

Scientific classification
- Kingdom: Animalia
- Phylum: Arthropoda
- Clade: Pancrustacea
- Class: Insecta
- Order: Coleoptera
- Suborder: Polyphaga
- Infraorder: Cucujiformia
- Family: Chrysomelidae
- Tribe: Luperini
- Subtribe: Luperina
- Genus: Cerophysella; Laboissière, 1930

Synonyms
- Chogania Laboissière, 1930

Genus of leaf beetles

Cerophysella is a genus of beetles belonging to the family Chrysomelidae.

== Species ==
- Cerophysella basalis (Baly, 1874)
- Cerophysella ceylanica (Allard, 1889)
- Cerophysella laosensis Kimoto, 1989
- Cerophysella tonkinensis Laboissiere, 1930
- Cerophysella viridipennis (Allard, 1889)
