= Lamprocopa =

Scientific classification
- Kingdom: Animalia
- Phylum: Arthropoda
- Clade: Pancrustacea
- Class: Insecta
- Order: Coleoptera
- Suborder: Polyphaga
- Infraorder: Cucujiformia
- Family: Chrysomelidae
- Tribe: Luperini
- Subtribe: Aulacophorina
- Genus: Lamprocopa; Hincks, 1949

Synonyms
- Copa Weise, 1892 (preocc.)

Genus of leaf beetles

Lamprocopa is a genus of beetles belonging to the family Chrysomelidae.

== Species ==
- Lamprocopa antennata (Weise, 1903)
- Lamprocopa delata (Erichson, 1843)
- Lamprocopa femoralis (Laboissiere, 1929)
- Lamprocopa kunowi (Weise, 1892)
- Lamprocopa nigripennis (Laboissiere, 1921)
- Lamprocopa occidentalis (Weise, 1895)
- Lamprocopa orientalis (Weise, 1903)
- Lamprocopa praecox (Klug, 1833)
- Lamprocopa rothschildi (Laboissiere, 1920)
- Lamprocopa seabrai (Gomez Alves, 1951)
