= Trachyscelida =

Scientific classification
- Kingdom: Animalia
- Phylum: Arthropoda
- Clade: Pancrustacea
- Class: Insecta
- Order: Coleoptera
- Suborder: Polyphaga
- Infraorder: Cucujiformia
- Family: Chrysomelidae
- Tribe: Luperini
- Subtribe: Diabroticina
- Genus: Trachyscelida; G. Horn, 1893

Synonyms
- Racenisa Bechyné, 1958

Genus of leaf beetles

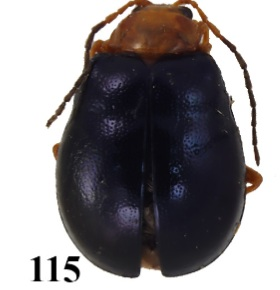
Trachyscelida venezuelensis

Trachyscelida is a genus of beetles belonging to the family Chrysomelidae.

== Species ==
- Trachyscelida bicolor (Leconte, 1884)
- Trachyscelida boliviana (Bechyne, 1958)
- Trachyscelida dichroma Viswajyothi & Clark, 2022
- Trachyscelida flourescens (Bechyne, 1958)
- Trachyscelida obesa (Duvivier, 1889)
- Trachyscelida robusta (Jacoby, 1888)
- Trachyscelida venezuelensis (Bechyne, 1958)
