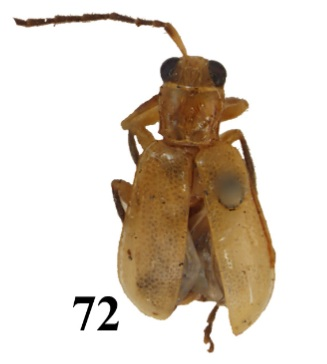

Scientific classification
- Kingdom: Animalia
- Phylum: Arthropoda
- Clade: Pancrustacea
- Class: Insecta
- Order: Coleoptera
- Suborder: Polyphaga
- Infraorder: Cucujiformia
- Family: Chrysomelidae
- Tribe: Luperini
- Subtribe: Diabroticina
- Genus: Microbrotica; Jacoby, 1887
- Species: M. subglabrata

Binomial name
- Microbrotica subglabrata Jacoby, 1887

= Microbrotica =

Genus of beetles

Microbrotica is a genus of leaf beetles in the family Chrysomelidae. There is one described species in Microbrotica, Microbrotica subglabrata, which is found in Panama.
