= Astena =

Scientific classification
- Kingdom: Animalia
- Phylum: Arthropoda
- Clade: Pancrustacea
- Class: Insecta
- Order: Coleoptera
- Suborder: Polyphaga
- Infraorder: Cucujiformia
- Family: Chrysomelidae
- Tribe: Luperini
- Subtribe: Luperina
- Genus: Astena; Baly, 1865

Genus of leaf beetles

Astena is a genus of beetles belonging to the family Chrysomelidae.

== Species ==
- Astena atripes Baly, 1856
- Astena maculipennis Jacoby, 1894
