= Romanita =

Scientific classification
- Kingdom: Animalia
- Phylum: Arthropoda
- Clade: Pancrustacea
- Class: Insecta
- Order: Coleoptera
- Suborder: Polyphaga
- Infraorder: Cucujiformia
- Family: Chrysomelidae
- Tribe: Luperini
- Subtribe: Diabroticina
- Genus: Romanita; Bechyné, 1957

Genus of leaf beetles

Romanita is a genus of beetles belonging to the family Chrysomelidae.

== Species ==
- Romanita amazonica Bechyne, 1958
- Romanita fasciata (Weise, 1921)
- Romanita maculipennis Bechyne, 1958
- Romanita ornata Bechyne, 1958
- Romanita vittata Bechyne, 1958
