= Nancita (beetle) =

Scientific classification
- Kingdom: Animalia
- Phylum: Arthropoda
- Clade: Pancrustacea
- Class: Insecta
- Order: Coleoptera
- Suborder: Polyphaga
- Infraorder: Cucujiformia
- Family: Chrysomelidae
- Subfamily: Galerucinae
- Tribe: Luperini
- Subtribe: Luperina
- Genus: Nancita; Allard, 1889
- Species: N. alterna

Binomial name
- Nancita alterna Allard, 1889

Genus of leaf beetles

Nancita is a genus of beetles belonging to the leaf beetle family Chrysomelidae, subfamily Galerucinae. The description of the genus by Ernest Allard in 1889 included only one species, Nancita alterna. It was collected by Carl Semper in a location given as "Pulobatu", which other sources place in the Philippines.

== Description ==
Nancita alterna was described in 1889 as having an oval-shaped, generally brownish yellow body. The head and thorax are dark brown as are the tarsi. The thorax is more-or-less square with slightly arched edges. The elytra are oval to oblong. The first half is slightly punctuated, the rest being smooth. The elytra are chestnut brown with a transverse white spot in the middle of each one occupying about a third of it.
