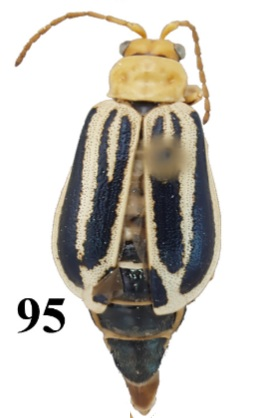

Scientific classification
- Kingdom: Animalia
- Phylum: Arthropoda
- Clade: Pancrustacea
- Class: Insecta
- Order: Coleoptera
- Suborder: Polyphaga
- Infraorder: Cucujiformia
- Family: Chrysomelidae
- Tribe: Luperini
- Subtribe: Diabroticina
- Genus: Rachicephala; Blake, 1966
- Species: R. vittatipennis

Binomial name
- Rachicephala vittatipennis (Jacoby, 1887)

Synonyms
- Neobrotica vittatipennis Jacoby, 1887

= Rachicephala =

Genus of beetles

Rachicephala is a genus of leaf beetles in the family Chrysomelidae. There is one described species in Rachicephala, Rachicephala vittatipennis, which is found in Mexico.
