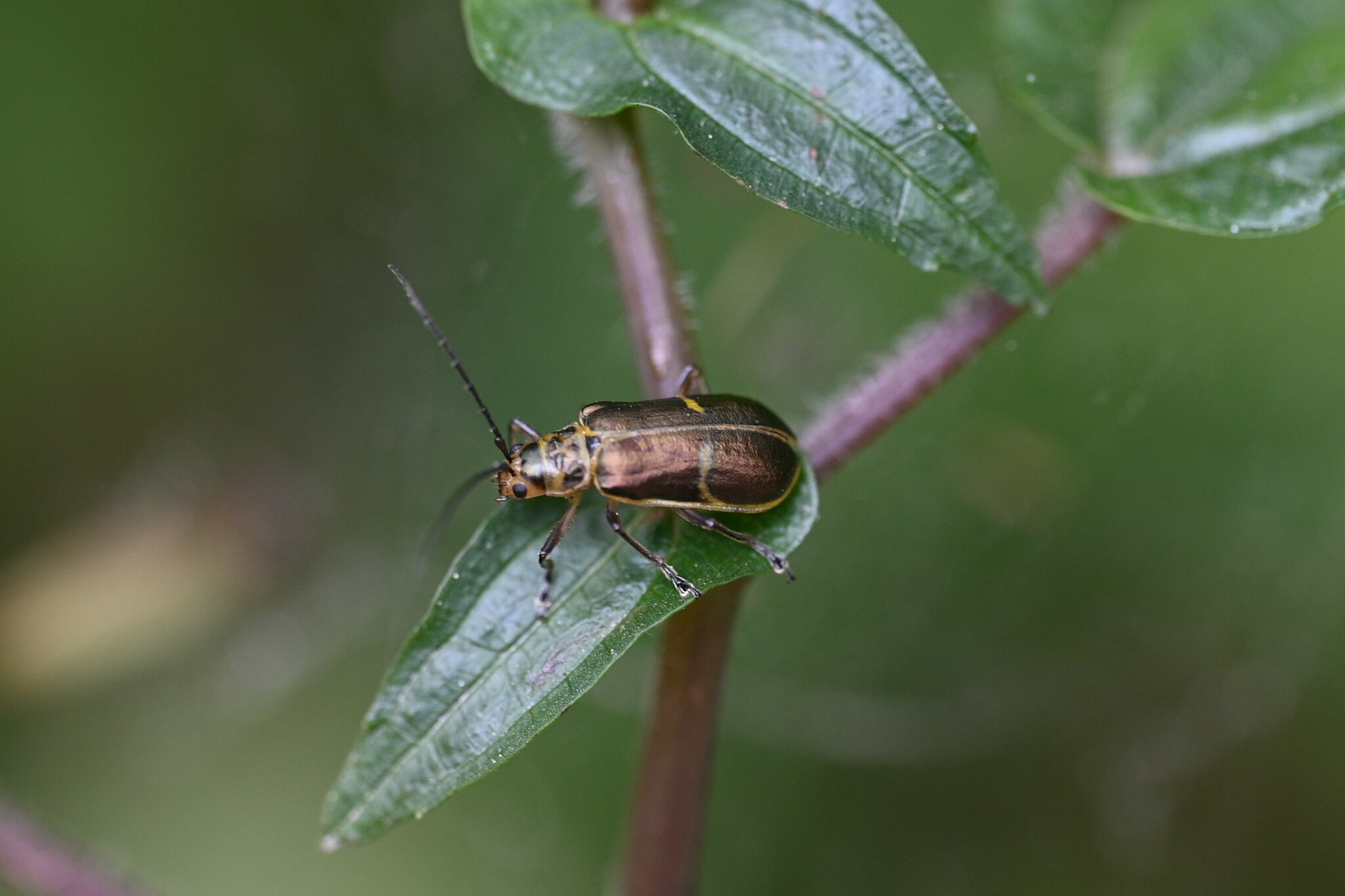
- Mimastra arcuata

Scientific classification
- Kingdom: Animalia
- Phylum: Arthropoda
- Clade: Pancrustacea
- Class: Insecta
- Order: Coleoptera
- Suborder: Polyphaga
- Infraorder: Cucujiformia
- Family: Chrysomelidae
- Subfamily: Galerucinae
- Tribe: Luperini
- Subtribe: Luperina
- Genus: Mimastra; Baly, 1865

Synonyms
- Anthraxantha Fairmaire in Deyrolle & Fairmaire, 1878; Neoatysa Abdullah & Qureshi, 1968

= Mimastra =

Genus of leaf beetles

Mimastra is a genus of skeletonizing leaf beetles in the family Chrysomelidae. There are more than 60 described species in Mimastra. They are found in Indomalaya and the Palearctic.

== Species ==
These 69 species belong to the genus Mimastra:

- Mimastra alternata (Jacoby, 1896)
- Mimastra andrewesi Bezděk, 2010
- Mimastra anicka Bezděk, 2011
- Mimastra annadalei (Jacoby, 1905)
- Mimastra aptera Takizawa, 1990
- Mimastra arcuata Baly, 1865
- Mimastra australis Takizawa, 1986
- Mimastra badia Kimoto, 1989
- Mimastra birmanica Bryant, 1954
- Mimastra brevicollis (Allard, 1889)
- Mimastra capitata Jacoby, 1887
- Mimastra chennelli Baly, 1897
- Mimastra costatipennis Jacoby, 1903
- Mimastra cyanura (Hope, 1831)
- Mimastra elegans (Allard, 1889)
- Mimastra davidis (Fairmaire, 1878)
- Mimastra fortipunctata Maulik, 1936
- Mimastra fouqueorum Bezděk & Lee, 2012
- Mimastra fulva Kimoto, 1983
- Mimastra gracilicornis Jacoby, 1889
- Mimastra gracilis Baly, 1878
- Mimastra grahami Gressitt & Kimoto, 1963
- Mimastra guerryi (Laboissière, 1929)
- Mimastra hajeki Bezděk, 2017
- Mimastra hsuehleeae Bezděk & Lee, 2012 (temperate Asia)
- Mimastra itoi (Takizawa, 1986)
- Mimastra jacobyi Bezděk, 2010
- Mimastra javana (Weise, 1922)
- Mimastra jelineki Bezděk, 2009
- Mimastra kandyensis Maulik, 1936
- Mimastra kremitovskyi Bezděk, 2009
- Mimastra laotica Bezděk & Lee, 2012
- Mimastra latimana Allard, 1890
- Mimastra levmedvedevi Romantsov, 2017
- Mimastra leyteana Medvedev, 1995
- Mimastra longicornis (Allard, 1888)
- Mimastra lunata (Kollar & Redtenbacher, 1844)
- Mimastra maai (Gressitt & Kimoto, 1936)
- Mimastra malvi (Chen, 1942)
- Mimastra modesta (Fairmaire, 1889)
- Mimastra nilgiriensis Bezděk, 2010
- Mimastra nitida Maulik, 1936
- Mimastra oblonga (Gyllenhal, 1808)
- Mimastra pallida Jacoby, 1896
- Mimastra parva (Allard, 1889)
- Mimastra persimilis Kimoto, 1989
- Mimastra platteeuwi (Duvivier, 1890)
- Mimastra polita (Jacoby, 1889)
- Mimastra procerula Zhang, Yang, Cui & Li, 2006
- Mimastra pygidialis Laboissière, 1929
- Mimastra quadrinotata (Gressitt & Kimoto, 1963)
- Mimastra quadripartita Baly, 1879
- Mimastra riedeli Bezděk, 2009
- Mimastra robusta Jacoby, 1887
- Mimastra rugosa (Jacoby, 1886)
- Mimastra schneideri Bezděk & Lee, 2012
- Mimastra scutellata (Jacoby, 1904)
- Mimastra semimarginata (Jacoby, 1886)
- Mimastra shahidi (Abdullah & Qureshi, 1968)
- Mimastra soreli Baly, 1878
- Mimastra strejceki Bezděk, 2010
- Mimastra submetallica (Jacoby, 1884)
- Mimastra sumatrensis (Jacoby, 1896)
- Mimastra suwai Takizawa, 1988
- Mimastra tarsalis Medvedev, 2009
- Mimastra tenuelimbata Lopatin, 2004
- Mimastra terminata (Allard, 1889)
- Mimastra uncitarsis Laboissière, 1940
- Mimastra violaceipennis (Jacoby, 1884)
