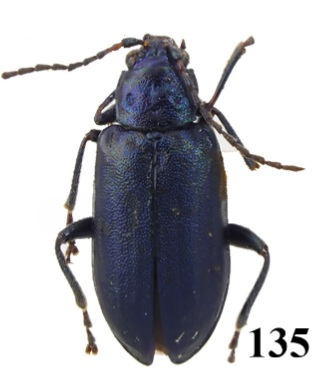

Scientific classification
- Kingdom: Animalia
- Phylum: Arthropoda
- Clade: Pancrustacea
- Class: Insecta
- Order: Coleoptera
- Suborder: Polyphaga
- Infraorder: Cucujiformia
- Family: Chrysomelidae
- Subfamily: Galerucinae
- Tribe: Luperini
- Subtribe: Luperina
- Genus: Scelidacne; Clark, 1998
- Species: S. andrewi

Binomial name
- Scelidacne andrewi Clark, 1998

= Scelidacne =

Genus of beetles

Scelidacne is a genus of leaf beetles in the family Chrysomelidae. It is monotypic, being represented by the single species, Scelidacne andrewi, which is found in Mexico (Chiapas).
