= Mahutia =

Scientific classification
- Kingdom: Animalia
- Phylum: Arthropoda
- Clade: Pancrustacea
- Class: Insecta
- Order: Coleoptera
- Suborder: Polyphaga
- Infraorder: Cucujiformia
- Family: Chrysomelidae
- Tribe: Luperini
- Subtribe: Aulacophorina
- Genus: Mahutia; Laboissière, 1917

Genus of leaf beetles

Mahutia is a genus of beetles belonging to the family Chrysomelidae.

== Species ==
- Mahutia alluaudi Laboissiere, 1917
- Mahutia jeanneli Laboissiere, 1917
- Mahutia leopoldi Laboissiere, 1929
- Mahutia rougemonti Silfverberg, 1980
