= Bipleura =

Scientific classification
- Kingdom: Animalia
- Phylum: Arthropoda
- Clade: Pancrustacea
- Class: Insecta
- Order: Coleoptera
- Suborder: Polyphaga
- Infraorder: Cucujiformia
- Family: Chrysomelidae
- Tribe: Luperini
- Subtribe: Luperina
- Genus: Bipleura; Laboissière, 1932

Genus of leaf beetles

Bipleura is a genus of beetles belonging to the family Chrysomelidae.

== Species ==
- Bipleura laboissiere Bechyne, 1957
- Bipleura singularis Laboissiere, 1932
