= Prasyptera =

Scientific classification
- Kingdom: Animalia
- Phylum: Arthropoda
- Clade: Pancrustacea
- Class: Insecta
- Order: Coleoptera
- Suborder: Polyphaga
- Infraorder: Cucujiformia
- Family: Chrysomelidae
- Tribe: Luperini
- Subtribe: Luperina
- Genus: Prasyptera; Baly, 1878

Genus of leaf beetles

Prasyptera is a genus of beetles belonging to the family Chrysomelidae.

== Species ==
- Prasyptera abdominalis Jacoby, 1894
- Prasyptera angusta Weise, 1922
- Prasyptera antennata Jacoby, 1886
- Prasyptera approximata Baly, 1878
- Prasyptera bennigseni Weise, 1908
- Prasyptera clypeata Jacoby, 1886
- Prasyptera distincta (Baly, 1878)
- Prasyptera dubiosa Jacoby, 1886
- Prasyptera haroldi (Baly, 1878)
- Prasyptera kempeni Weise, 1917
- Prasyptera lorentzi Weise, 1912
- Prasyptera mastersi (Blackburn, 1896)
- Prasyptera nigripes Jacoby, 1886
- Prasyptera nitens Weise, 1912
- Prasyptera nitidipennis Baly, 1886
- Prasyptera rugicollis Laboissiere, 1932
- Prasyptera rugosa Jacoby, 1894
- Prasyptera straeleni Laboissiere, 1932
- Prasyptera unifasciata Jacoby, 1886
- Prasyptera varicolor Weise, 1917
- Prasyptera wallacei Baly, 1878
- Prasyptera yulensis Laboissiere, 1932
