= Eumelepta =

Scientific classification
- Kingdom: Animalia
- Phylum: Arthropoda
- Clade: Pancrustacea
- Class: Insecta
- Order: Coleoptera
- Suborder: Polyphaga
- Infraorder: Cucujiformia
- Family: Chrysomelidae
- Tribe: Luperini
- Subtribe: Luperina
- Genus: Eumelepta; Jacoby, 1892

Genus of leaf beetles

Eumelepta is a genus of beetles belonging to the family Chrysomelidae.

== Species ==
- Eumelepta biplagiata Jacoby, 1892
- Eumelepta clypeata (Jacoby, 1900)
- Eumelepta discalis (Gressitt & Kimoto, 1963)
- Eumelepta variabilis (Gressitt & Kimoto, 1963)
