= Afrocrania =

Scientific classification
- Kingdom: Animalia
- Phylum: Arthropoda
- Clade: Pancrustacea
- Class: Insecta
- Order: Coleoptera
- Suborder: Polyphaga
- Infraorder: Cucujiformia
- Family: Chrysomelidae
- Subfamily: Galerucinae
- Tribe: Luperini
- Subtribe: Luperina
- Genus: Afrocrania; Hincks, 1949

Type species
- Pseudocrania latifrons Weise, 1892

Synonyms
- Pseudocrania Weise, 1892 (not M'Coy, 1851)

Genus of leaf beetles

Afrocrania is a genus of beetles belonging to the family Chrysomelidae. It is distributed in the Afrotropical realm.

== Species ==
The genus contains 16 species:

- Afrocrania aequatoriana Wagner, 2007
- Afrocrania assimilis (Weise, 1903)
- Afrocrania famularis (Weise, 1904)
- Afrocrania foveolata (Karsch, 1882)
- Afrocrania kaethae Middelhauve & Wagner, 2001
- Afrocrania kakamegaensis Middelhauve & Wagner, 2001
- Afrocrania latifrons (Weise, 1892)
- Afrocrania longicornis Middelhauve & Wagner, 2001
- Afrocrania luciae Middelhauve & Wagner, 2001
- Afrocrania minima Wagner, 2007
- Afrocrania nigra Wagner, 2007
- Afrocrania occidentalis Wagner, 2007
- Afrocrania pallida Wagner, 2007
- Afrocrania pauli (Weise, 1903)
- Afrocrania ubatubae Middelhauve & Wagner, 2001
- Afrocrania weisei Wagner, 2007
