= Hatita (beetle) =

Scientific classification
- Kingdom: Animalia
- Phylum: Arthropoda
- Clade: Pancrustacea
- Class: Insecta
- Order: Coleoptera
- Suborder: Polyphaga
- Infraorder: Cucujiformia
- Family: Chrysomelidae
- Tribe: Luperini
- Subtribe: Aulacophorina
- Genus: Hatita; Fairmaire, 1891

Genus of leaf beetles

Hatita is a genus of beetles belonging to the family Chrysomelidae.

== Species ==
- Hatita choensis Fairmaire, 1893
- Hatita limbatella (Fairmaire, 1891)
