= Laetana =

Scientific classification
- Kingdom: Animalia
- Phylum: Arthropoda
- Clade: Pancrustacea
- Class: Insecta
- Order: Coleoptera
- Suborder: Polyphaga
- Infraorder: Cucujiformia
- Family: Chrysomelidae
- Tribe: Luperini
- Subtribe: Aulacophorina
- Genus: Laetana; Baly, 1864

Genus of leaf beetles

Laetana is a genus of beetles belonging to the family Chrysomelidae.

== Species ==
- Laetana bipunctata Laboissiere, 1921
- Laetana collarti Laboissiere, 1932
- Laetana divisa (Gerstaecker, 1855)
- Laetana historio Baly, 1864
- Laetana jeanneli Laboissiere, 1918
- Laetana oculata Laboissiere, 1921
- Laetana opulenta (Peringuey, 1892)
- Laetana pallida Duvivier, 1884
- Laetana schultzei Weise, 1908
- Laetana transversofasciata Laboissiere, 1921
- Laetana trifasciata (Allard, 1888)
