= Coronabrotica =

Scientific classification
- Kingdom: Animalia
- Phylum: Arthropoda
- Clade: Pancrustacea
- Class: Insecta
- Order: Coleoptera
- Suborder: Polyphaga
- Infraorder: Cucujiformia
- Family: Chrysomelidae
- Tribe: Luperini
- Subtribe: Diabroticina
- Genus: Coronabrotica; Moura, 2010
- Species: C. amazonensis

Binomial name
- Coronabrotica amazonensis Moura, 2010

Genus of beetles

Coronabrotica is a genus of leaf beetles in the family Chrysomelidae. It is monotypic, being represented by the single species , Coronabrotica amazonensis, which is found in Brazil.
