= Jacobya =

Scientific classification
- Kingdom: Animalia
- Phylum: Arthropoda
- Clade: Pancrustacea
- Class: Insecta
- Order: Coleoptera
- Suborder: Polyphaga
- Infraorder: Cucujiformia
- Family: Chrysomelidae
- Tribe: Luperini
- Subtribe: Aulacophorina
- Genus: Jacobya; Weise, 1901

Genus of leaf beetles

Jacobya is a genus of beetles belonging to the family Chrysomelidae.

== Species ==
- Jacobya cavicollis (Fairmaire, 1880)
- Jacobya notabilis Weise, 1902
- Jacobya ochracea Weise, 1901
- Jacobya pilosula Weise, 1902
- Jacobya viridis Weise, 1904
