= Diacantha (beetle) =

Scientific classification
- Kingdom: Animalia
- Phylum: Arthropoda
- Clade: Pancrustacea
- Class: Insecta
- Order: Coleoptera
- Suborder: Polyphaga
- Infraorder: Cucujiformia
- Family: Chrysomelidae
- Tribe: Luperini
- Subtribe: Aulacophorina
- Genus: Diacantha; Chevrolat, 1837

Synonyms
- Corynopalpa Dejean, 1836; Idacantha Fairmaire, 1869; Hyperacantha Chapuis, 1879

Genus of leaf beetles

Diacantha is a genus of beetles belonging to the family Chrysomelidae.

== Species ==
- Diacantha abdominalis (Jacoby, 1891)
- Diacantha aeneoguttata (Fairmaire, 1884)
- Diacantha affinis Weise, 1901
- Diacantha albidicornis Weise, 1901
- Diacantha apicata (Weise, 1912)
- Diacantha beniensis (Laboissiere, 1924)
- Diacantha bidentata (Fabricius, 1781)
- Diacantha bifasciata (Laboissiere, 1924)
- Diacantha bifida (Laboissiere, 1924)
- Diacantha bifossulata (Laboissiere, 1931)
- Diacantha bifrons (Laboissiere, 1924)
- Diacantha bifurcata (Laboissiere, 1924)
- Diacantha bisbipunctata Weise, 1903
- Diacantha bituberculata (Fabricius, 1781)
- Diacantha burgeoni (Laboissiere, 1924)
- Diacantha carinata (Laboissiere, 1924)
- Diacantha caudata Weise, 1903
- Diacantha caviventris (Laboissiere, 1924)
- Diacantha cincta (Laboissiere, 1924)
- Diacantha collaris Weise, 1901
- Diacantha colmanti (Laboissiere, 1924)
- Diacantha colorata (Chapuis, 1879)
- Diacantha complexa (Laboissiere, 1924)
- Diacantha cupripennis (Laboissiere, 1924)
- Diacantha deusseni Karsch, 1881
- Diacantha diffusa Weise, 1901
- Diacantha dimidiata (Laboissiere, 1924)
- Diacantha dubia (Laboissiere, 1924)
- Diacantha duplicata Gerstaecker, 1871
- Diacantha elegans (Laboissiere, 1924)
- Diacantha enodis Weise, 1903
- Diacantha equatorialis (Laboissiere, 1924)
- Diacantha feai (Laboissiere, 1929)
- Diacantha fenestrata (Chapuis, 1879)
- Diacantha flavodorsata (Fairmaire, 1893)
- Diacantha flavonigra (Thomson, 1858)
- Diacantha fulva (Laboissiere, 1924)
- Diacantha ghesquierei (Labossiere, 1940)
- Diacantha humilis Weise, 1903
- Diacantha hybrida (Laboissiere, 1924)
- Diacantha hypomelaena (Thomson, 1857)
- Diacantha imitans (Laboissiere, 1924)
- Diacantha incerta Weise, 1903
- Diacantha insignita (Fairmaire, 1889)
- Diacantha jacobyi Weise, 1901
- Diacantha kolbei Weise, 1903
- Diacantha kraatzi (Jacoby, 1895)
- Diacantha laciniata Weise, 1924
- Diacantha longula Weise, 1903
- Diacantha marshalli (Laboissiere, 1924)
- Diacantha melanoptera (Thomson, 1857)
- Diacantha mimula Weise, 1903
- Diacantha modesta Weise, 1903
- Diacantha neumanni Weise, 1907
- Diacantha nigricornis Weise, 1901
- Diacantha nigrococcinea (Laboissiere, 1924)
- Diacantha oberthuri Jacoby, 1885
- Diacantha ornata Fairmaire, 1903
- Diacantha pallidula (Laboissiere, 1924)
- Diacantha pallipes Weise, 1901
- Diacantha parvula Weise, 1903
- Diacantha patrizii (Laboissiere, 1937)
- Diacantha pectoralis Fairmaire, 1898
- Diacantha preussi Weise, 1903
- Diacantha punctatissima (Jacoby, 1891)
- Diacantha regularis Weise, 1907
- Diacantha seminigra (Allard, 1888)
- Diacantha senegalensis (Laboissiere, 1924)
- Diacantha silvana Jacoby, 1906
- Diacantha similis (Laboissiere, 1924)
- Diacantha sinousa Weise, 1903
- Diacantha sternalis (Laboissiere, 1924)
- Diacantha straeleni (Laboissiere, 1939)
- Diacantha stuhlmanni Weise, 1903
- Diacantha uelensis (Laboissiere, 1924)
- Diacantha unifasciata (Olivier, 1808)
- Diacantha varians Weise, 1901
- Diacantha verticalis (Fairmaire, 1893)
- Diacantha vicina (Laboissiere, 1924)
- Diacantha viridipennis Jacoby, 1885
- Diacantha viridipicta (Fairmaire, 1902)
