= Khasia (beetle) =

Scientific classification
- Kingdom: Animalia
- Phylum: Arthropoda
- Clade: Pancrustacea
- Class: Insecta
- Order: Coleoptera
- Suborder: Polyphaga
- Infraorder: Cucujiformia
- Family: Chrysomelidae
- Tribe: Luperini
- Subtribe: Luperina
- Genus: Khasia; Jacoby, 1899

Synonyms
- Harmandinia Laboissière, 1932

Genus of leaf beetles

Khasia is a genus of beetles belonging to the family Chrysomelidae.

== Species ==
- Khasia itorum Kimoto, 1984
- Khasia kraatzi Jacoby, 1899
- Khasia nigra Bryant, 1925
- Khasia nitida Bryant, 1957
- Khasia paradoxa (Laboissiere, 1932)
- Khasia rugosa Bryant, 1957
