= Cannonia (beetle) =

Scientific classification
- Kingdom: Animalia
- Phylum: Arthropoda
- Clade: Pancrustacea
- Class: Insecta
- Order: Coleoptera
- Suborder: Polyphaga
- Infraorder: Cucujiformia
- Family: Chrysomelidae
- Subfamily: Galerucinae
- Tribe: Luperini
- Subtribe: Aulacophorina
- Genus: Cannonia; Hincks, 1949

Genus of leaf beetles

Cannonia is a genus of beetles belonging to the family Chrysomelidae.

== Species ==
- Cannonia meridionalis (Weise, 1901)
- Cannonia occidentalis (Weise, 1901)
- Cannonia petersi (Bertoloni, 1868)
- Cannonia sagonai (Laboissiere, 1921)
