= Taenala =

Scientific classification
- Kingdom: Animalia
- Phylum: Arthropoda
- Clade: Pancrustacea
- Class: Insecta
- Order: Coleoptera
- Suborder: Polyphaga
- Infraorder: Cucujiformia
- Family: Chrysomelidae
- Tribe: Luperini
- Subtribe: Aulacophorina
- Genus: Taenala; Silferberg, 1978

Genus of leaf beetles

Taenala is a genus of beetles belonging to the family Chrysomelidae.

== Species ==
- Taenala adumbrata Silfverberg, 1978
- Taenala divisa (Gerstaecker, 1855)
