= Palmaria tibialis =

Scientific classification
- Kingdom: Animalia
- Phylum: Arthropoda
- Clade: Pancrustacea
- Class: Insecta
- Order: Coleoptera
- Suborder: Polyphaga
- Infraorder: Cucujiformia
- Family: Chrysomelidae
- Subfamily: Galerucinae
- Tribe: Luperini
- Subtribe: Diabroticina
- Genus: Palmaria; Bechyné, 1956
- Species: P. tibialis

Binomial name
- Palmaria tibialis Bechyné, 1956

Genus of beetles

Palmaria is a genus of leaf beetles in the family Chrysomelidae. There is one described species in Palmaria, Palmaria tibialis, which is found in Bolivia and Peru.
