= Capula (beetle) =

Scientific classification
- Kingdom: Animalia
- Phylum: Arthropoda
- Clade: Pancrustacea
- Class: Insecta
- Order: Coleoptera
- Suborder: Polyphaga
- Infraorder: Cucujiformia
- Family: Chrysomelidae
- Subfamily: Galerucinae
- Tribe: Hylaspini
- Genus: Capula; Jacobson, 1925

Type species
- Capula metallica Jacobson, 1925

Genus of beetles

Capula is a genus of leaf beetles in the family Chrysomelidae. It contains three species distributed in western China. It is a member of the section "Capulites" in the tribe Hylaspini of the subfamily Galerucinae, alongside Furusawaia (including Yunnaniata), Nepalogaleruca and Himaplosonyx. All species in Capula are wingless, a character shared by the other genera in the section Capulites.

== Species ==
The genus contains three species:

- Capula apicalis Chen, Wang & Jiang, 1986 – Sichuan
- Capula caudata Chen, Wang & Jiang, 1986 – Sichuan
- Capula metallica Jacobson, 1925 – Qinghai, Sichuan, Tibet
