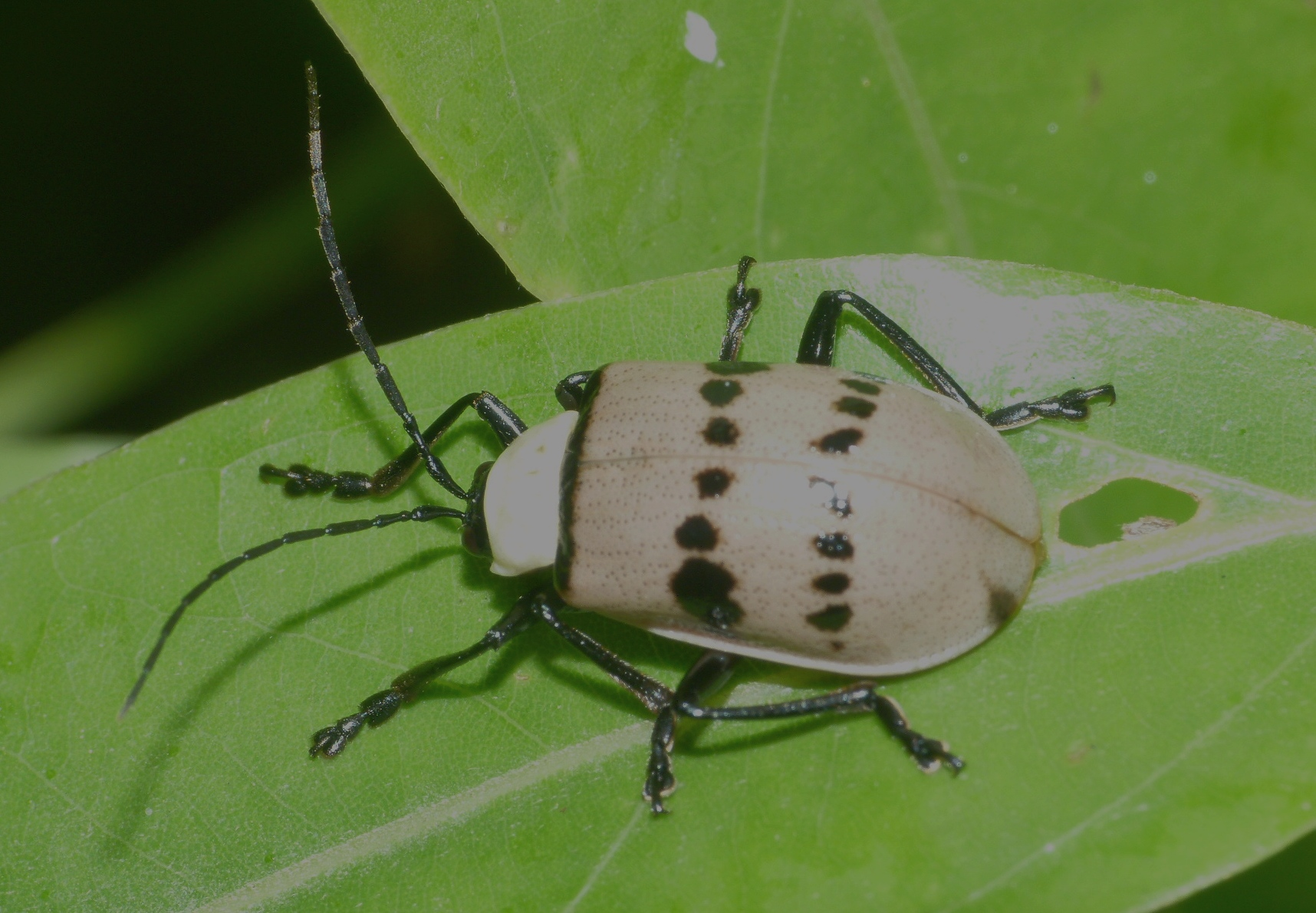
- Meristata spilota

Scientific classification
- Kingdom: Animalia
- Phylum: Arthropoda
- Clade: Pancrustacea
- Class: Insecta
- Order: Coleoptera
- Suborder: Polyphaga
- Infraorder: Cucujiformia
- Family: Chrysomelidae
- Tribe: Hylaspini
- Genus: Meristata; Strand, 1935

Type species
- Galleruca sexmaculata Kollar & Redtenbacher, 1844

Synonyms
- Merista Chapuis, 1874 (preoccupied)

= Meristata =

Genus of beetles

Meristata is a genus of Asian leaf beetles in the subfamily Galerucinae. Most of the species in the genus are found along the Himalayas in the China and the Indian Subcontinent.

Species in the genus include:

- Meristata dohrnii (Baly, 1861)
- Meristata elongata (Jacoby, 1898)
- Meristata fallax (Harold, 1880)
- Meristata fraternalis (Baly, 1879)
- Meristata pulunini (Bryant, 1952)
- Meristata quadrifasciata (Hope, 1831)
- Meristata sexmaculata (Kollar & Redtenbacher, 1844)
- Meristata spilota (Hope, 1831) (synonym: Meristata trifasciata (Hope, 1831))

The species Meristata jayarami (Vazirani, 1970) was moved to the genus Leptarthra, and the species Meristata maculata (Bryant, 1954) was moved to the genus Paraspitiella.
