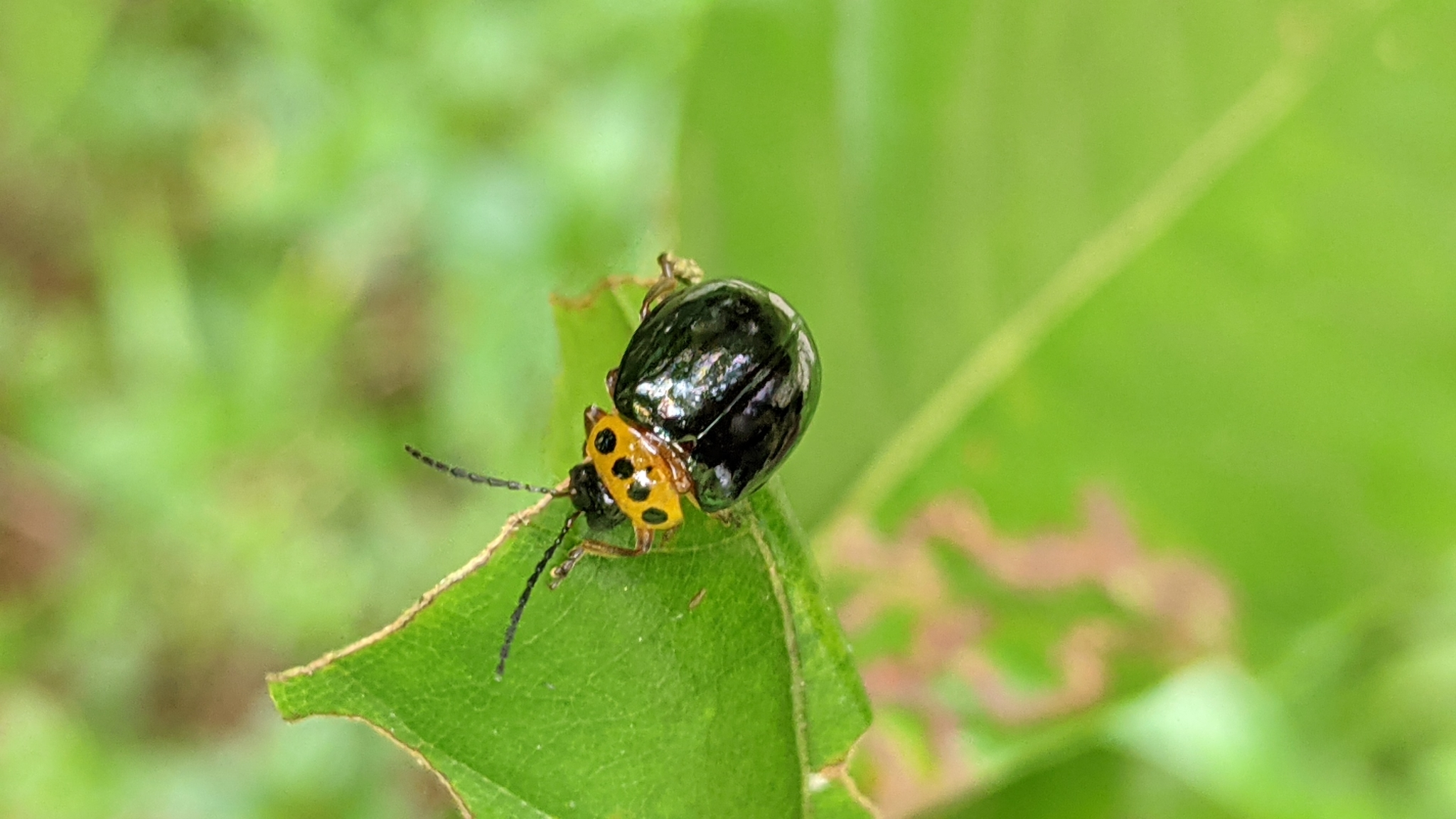
- Morphosphaera chrysomeloides, Taiwan

Scientific classification
- Kingdom: Animalia
- Phylum: Arthropoda
- Clade: Pancrustacea
- Class: Insecta
- Order: Coleoptera
- Suborder: Polyphaga
- Infraorder: Cucujiformia
- Family: Chrysomelidae
- Subfamily: Galerucinae
- Tribe: Hylaspini
- Genus: Morphosphaera
- Species: M. chrysomeloides

Binomial name
- Morphosphaera chrysomeloides (Bates, 1866)

= Morphosphaera chrysomeloides =

Species of skeletonizing leaf beetle

Morphosphaera chrysomeloides is a species of skeletonizing leaf beetle in the family Chrysomelidae. It is found in Taiwan and eastern Asia.
