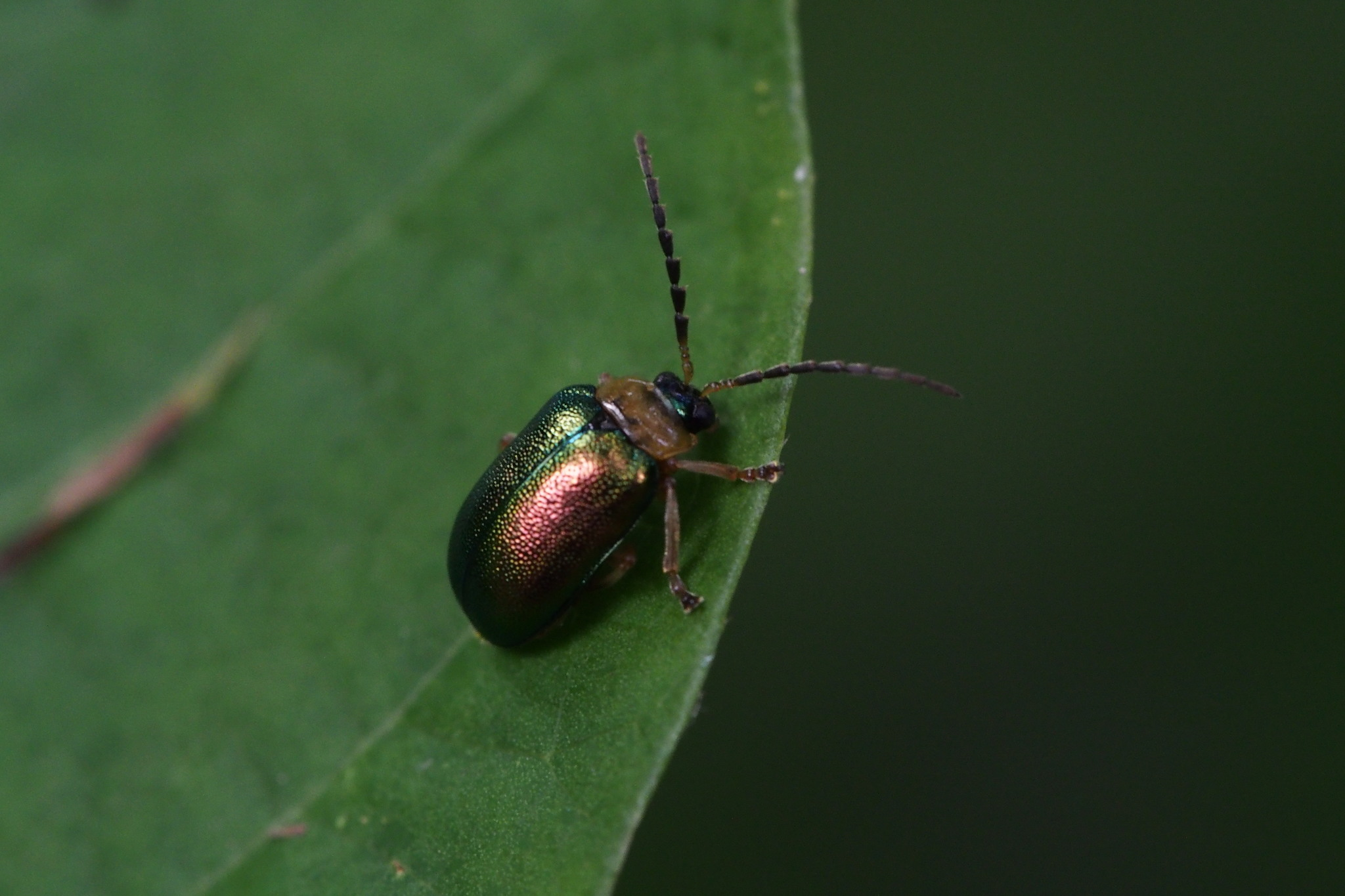
- Agelasa nigriceps, Japan

Scientific classification
- Kingdom: Animalia
- Phylum: Arthropoda
- Class: Insecta
- Order: Coleoptera
- Suborder: Polyphaga
- Infraorder: Cucujiformia
- Family: Chrysomelidae
- Subfamily: Galerucinae
- Tribe: Hylaspini
- Genus: Agelasa
- Species: A. nigriceps

Binomial name
- Agelasa nigriceps Motschulsky, 1860

= Agelasa nigriceps =

Species of skeletonizing leaf beetle

Agelasa nigriceps is a species of skeletonizing leaf beetle in the family Chrysomelidae, found in the Palearctic. Its most common host plant is Actinidia arguta, although the beetles have been evolving in Japan to use Pterostyrax hispidus as a host plant.
