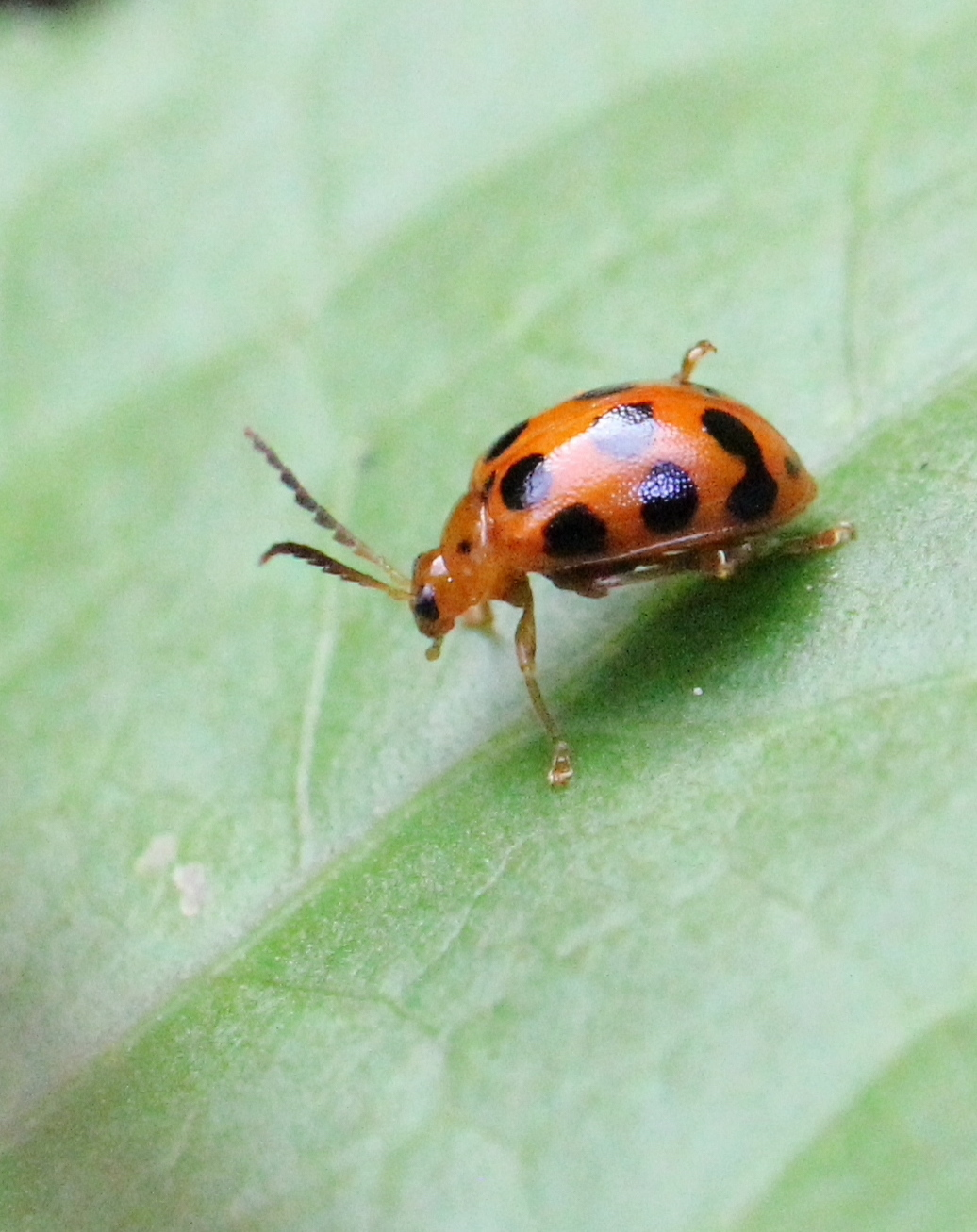
- Sphenoraia nebulosa, China

Scientific classification
- Kingdom: Animalia
- Phylum: Arthropoda
- Clade: Pancrustacea
- Class: Insecta
- Order: Coleoptera
- Suborder: Polyphaga
- Infraorder: Cucujiformia
- Family: Chrysomelidae
- Subfamily: Galerucinae
- Tribe: Hylaspini
- Genus: Sphenoraia
- Species: S. nebulosa

Binomial name
- Sphenoraia nebulosa (Gyllenhaal, 1808)

= Sphenoraia nebulosa =

Species of skeletonizing leaf beetle

Sphenoraia nebulosa is a species of skeletonizing leaf beetle in the family Chrysomelidae, found in Indomalaya and eastern Asia.
