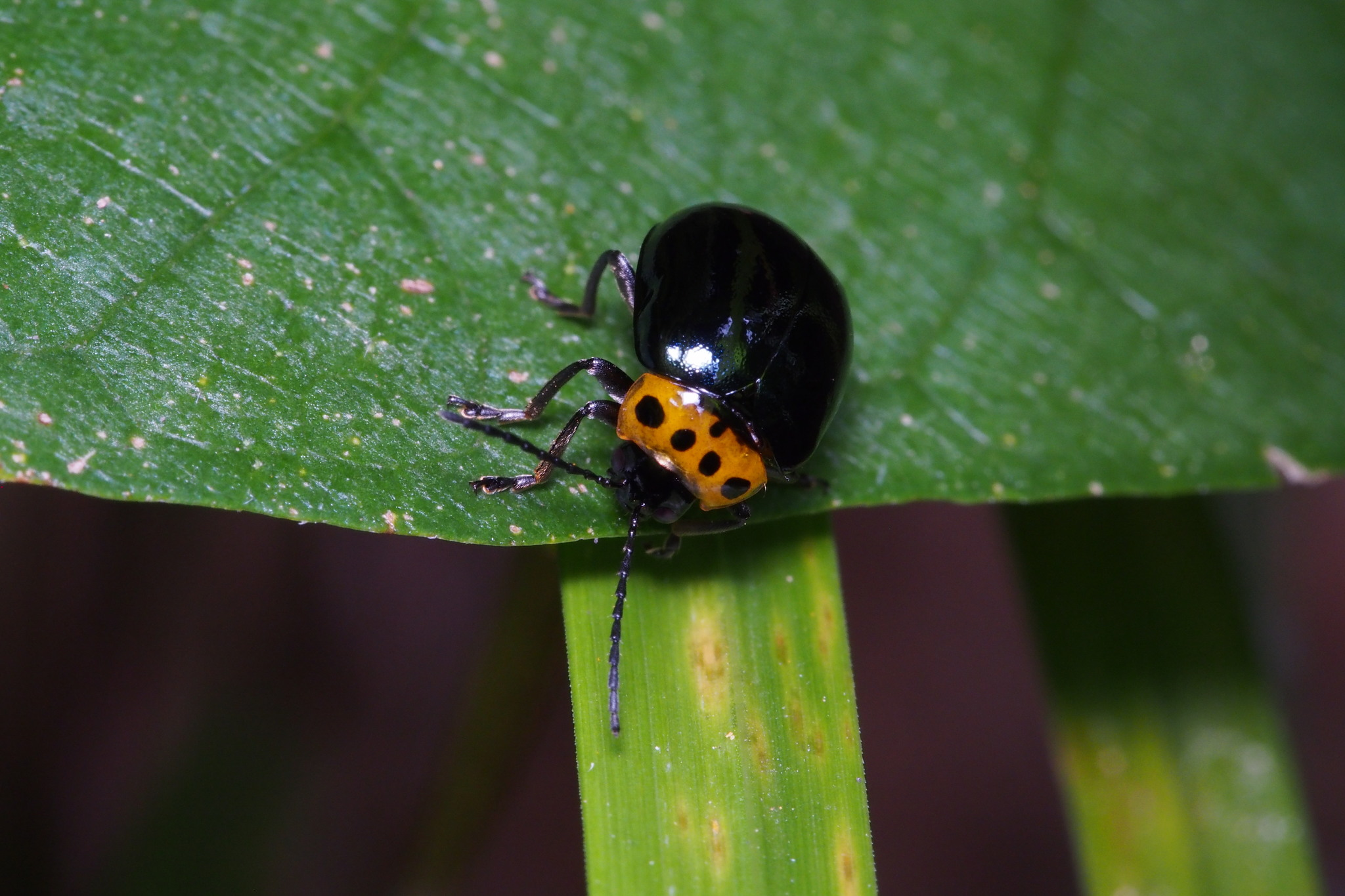
- Morphosphaera japonica, Japan

Scientific classification
- Kingdom: Animalia
- Phylum: Arthropoda
- Clade: Pancrustacea
- Class: Insecta
- Order: Coleoptera
- Suborder: Polyphaga
- Infraorder: Cucujiformia
- Family: Chrysomelidae
- Subfamily: Galerucinae
- Tribe: Hylaspini
- Genus: Morphosphaera
- Species: M. japonica

Binomial name
- Morphosphaera japonica (Hornstedt, 1788)

= Morphosphaera japonica =

Species of skeletonizing leaf beetle

Morphosphaera japonica is a species of skeletonizing leaf beetle in the family Chrysomelidae, found eastern Asia.
