= Cyclantipha =

Scientific classification
- Kingdom: Animalia
- Phylum: Arthropoda
- Clade: Pancrustacea
- Class: Insecta
- Order: Coleoptera
- Suborder: Polyphaga
- Infraorder: Cucujiformia
- Family: Chrysomelidae
- Subfamily: Galerucinae
- Tribe: Hylaspini
- Genus: Cyclantipha; Laboissière, 1932

Genus of leaf beetles

Cyclantipha is a genus of beetles belonging to the family Chrysomelidae.

== Species ==
- Cyclantipha ornata Labossiere, 1932
- Cyclantipha quadriplagiata Medvedev, 2004
- Cyclantipha ulyssis Laboissiere, 1932
