= Borneola =

Scientific classification
- Kingdom: Animalia
- Phylum: Arthropoda
- Clade: Pancrustacea
- Class: Insecta
- Order: Coleoptera
- Suborder: Polyphaga
- Infraorder: Cucujiformia
- Family: Chrysomelidae
- Subfamily: Galerucinae
- Tribe: Hylaspini
- Genus: Borneola; Mohamedsaid, 1998

Genus of leaf beetles

Borneola is a genus of beetles belonging to the family Chrysomelidae.

== Species ==
- Borneola hijau Mohamedsaid, 1998
- Borneola mohamedsaidi
- Borneola peregrina
- Borneola variabilis Mohamedsaid, 1998
