= Yunaspes =

Scientific classification
- Kingdom: Animalia
- Phylum: Arthropoda
- Clade: Pancrustacea
- Class: Insecta
- Order: Coleoptera
- Suborder: Polyphaga
- Infraorder: Cucujiformia
- Family: Chrysomelidae
- Subfamily: Galerucinae
- Tribe: Hylaspini
- Genus: Yunaspes; Chen in Chen et al., 1976

Genus of leaf beetles

Yunaspes is a genus of beetles belonging to the family Chrysomelidae.

== Species ==
- Yunaspes modogensis Jiang, 1988
- Yunaspes nigritarsis Chen, 1976
