= Sermylassa =

Scientific classification
- Kingdom: Animalia
- Phylum: Arthropoda
- Clade: Pancrustacea
- Class: Insecta
- Order: Coleoptera
- Suborder: Polyphaga
- Infraorder: Cucujiformia
- Family: Chrysomelidae
- Subfamily: Galerucinae
- Tribe: Hylaspini
- Genus: Sermylassa; Reitter, 1912

Synonyms
- Sermyla Chapuis, 1875 (preocc.)

Genus of leaf beetles

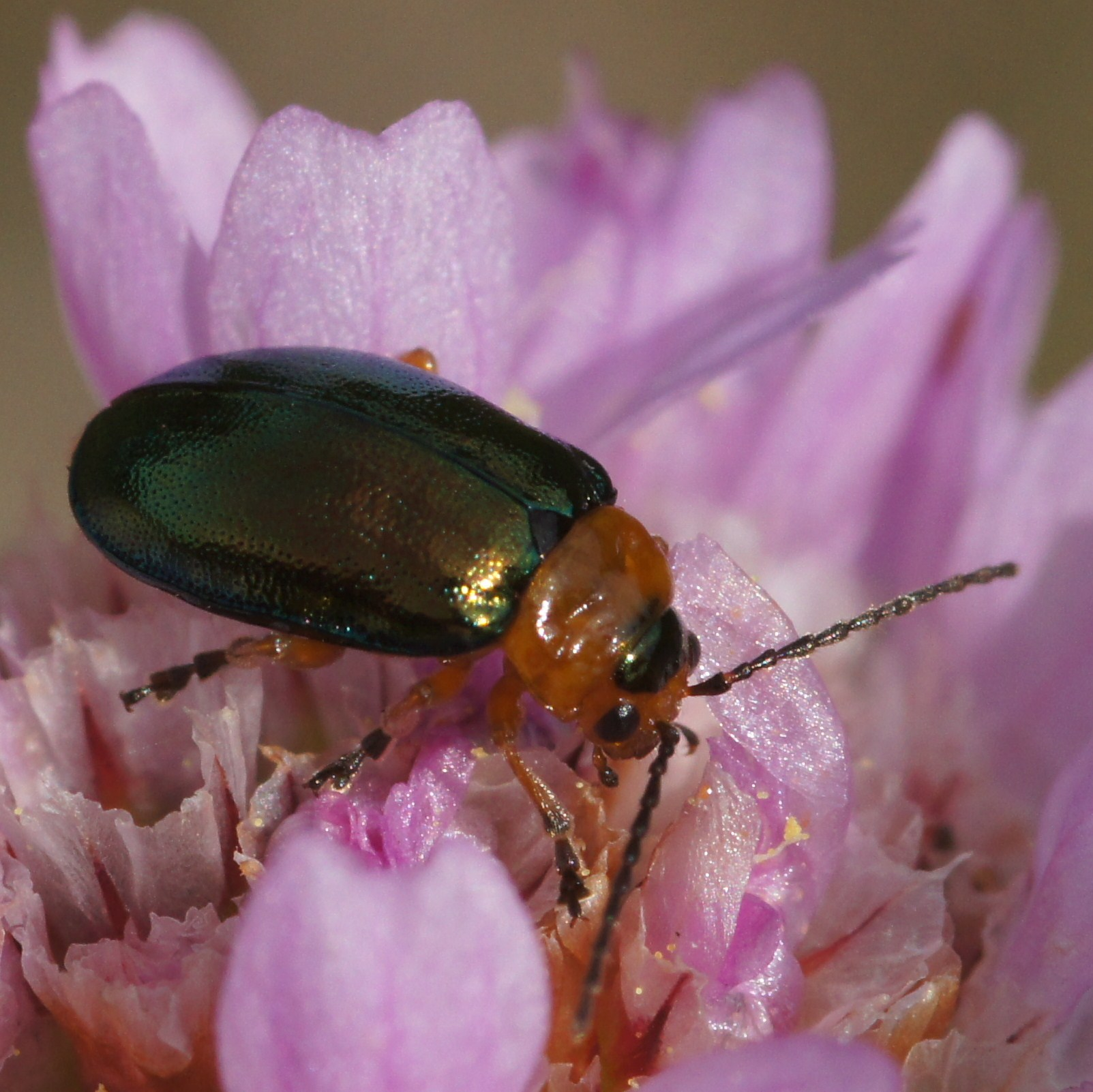
Sermylassa halensis, Sweden.

Sermylassa is a genus of beetles belonging to the family Chrysomelidae.

== Species ==
- Sermylassa halensis (Linnaeus, 1767)
