= Sermyloides =

Scientific classification
- Kingdom: Animalia
- Phylum: Arthropoda
- Clade: Pancrustacea
- Class: Insecta
- Order: Coleoptera
- Suborder: Polyphaga
- Infraorder: Cucujiformia
- Family: Chrysomelidae
- Subfamily: Galerucinae
- Tribe: Hylaspini
- Genus: Sermyloides; Jacoby, 1884

Synonyms
- Praeochralea Duvivier, 1885

Genus of leaf beetles

Sermyloides is a genus of beetles belonging to the family Chrysomelidae.

== Species ==
- Sermyloides antennalis (Duvivier, 1885)
- Sermyloides apicalis Laboissiere, 1936
- Sermyloides baishanzuia Yang, 1995
- Sermyloides banski (Weise, 1913)
- Sermyloides bicolor (Jacoby, 1896)
- Sermyloides biconcava Yang, 1991
- Sermyloides bimaculata (Gressitt & Kimoto, 1963)
- Sermyloides biuneiata Yang, 1991
- Sermyloides coomani Laboissiere, 1936
- Sermyloides cribellata Yang, 1991
- Sermyloides cuspidata Yang, 1991
- Sermyloides decorata (Chen, 1942)
- Sermyloides dilaticornis (Jacoby, 1892)
- Sermyloides foveatus Medvedev, 2000
- Sermyloides javanensis (Weise, 1924)
- Sermyloides lii Yang & Li in Li & Jin, 2002
- Sermyloides maculata (Jacoby, 1895)
- Sermyloides maculatipennis Kimoto, 1989
- Sermyloides major Kimoto, 1989
- Sermyloides nigricollis Medvedev, 2015
- Sermyloides nigripennis (Gressitt & Kimoto, 1963)
- Sermyloides pallicornis (Fabricius, 1801)
- Sermyloides pilifera Yang, 1991
- Sermyloides pilosa Yang, 1991
- Sermyloides scutellata (Jacoby, 1896)
- Sermyloides semiornata (Chen, 1942)
- Sermyloides sexmaculata Yang, 1991
- Sermyloides sulcata Yang, 1991
- Sermyloides tamdaoana Medvedev, 2015
- Sermyloides tompok Mohamedsaid, 2001
- Sermyloides umbonata Yang, 1991
- Sermyloides unicolor Mohamedsaid, 1997
- Sermyloides unifasciata Jacoby, 1900
- Sermyloides variabilis Kimoto, 1989
- Sermyloides varicolor (Chen, 1942)
- Sermyloides vittipennis (Duvivier, 1891)
- Sermyloides wangi Yang, 1993
- Sermyloides yunnanensis Yang, 1991
