= Pseudeustetha =

Scientific classification
- Kingdom: Animalia
- Phylum: Arthropoda
- Clade: Pancrustacea
- Class: Insecta
- Order: Coleoptera
- Suborder: Polyphaga
- Infraorder: Cucujiformia
- Family: Chrysomelidae
- Subfamily: Galerucinae
- Tribe: Hylaspini
- Genus: Pseudeustetha; Jacoby, 1899

Genus of leaf beetles

Pseudeustetha is a genus of beetles belonging to the family Chrysomelidae.

== Species ==
- Pseudeustetha philippina Medvedev, 2002
- Pseudeustetha quadriplagiata (Jacoby, 1899)
