= Bonesia =

Scientific classification
- Kingdom: Animalia
- Phylum: Arthropoda
- Clade: Pancrustacea
- Class: Insecta
- Order: Coleoptera
- Suborder: Polyphaga
- Infraorder: Cucujiformia
- Family: Chrysomelidae
- Subfamily: Galerucinae
- Tribe: Hylaspini
- Genus: Bonesia; Baly, 1865

Genus of leaf beetles

Bonesia is a genus of beetles belonging to the family Chrysomelidae.

== Species ==
- Bonesia adusta (Harold, 1879)
- Bonesia clarkii Baly, 1865
- Bonesia dimidiata Laboissiere, 1926
- Bonesia inornata (Chen, 1942)
- Bonesia missis Laboissiere, 1926
- Bonesia quinquepunctata (Klug, 1924)
- Bonesia serricornis (Thomson, 1858)
- Bonesia variabilis Duvivier, 1885
