= Emathea =

Scientific classification
- Kingdom: Animalia
- Phylum: Arthropoda
- Clade: Pancrustacea
- Class: Insecta
- Order: Coleoptera
- Suborder: Polyphaga
- Infraorder: Cucujiformia
- Family: Chrysomelidae
- Subfamily: Galerucinae
- Tribe: Hylaspini
- Genus: Emathea; Baly, 1865

Genus of leaf beetles

Emathea is a genus of beetles belonging to the family Chrysomelidae.

== Species ==
- Emathea aeneipennis (Baly, 1865)
- Emathea aptera Kimoto, 1989
- Emathea balyi (Jacoby, 1896)
- Emathea fulvicornis (Jacoby, 1896)
- Emathea intermedia (Jacoby, 1899)
- Emathea jacobyi (Duvivier, 1884)
- Emathea moseri Weise, 1922
- Emathea punctata (Allard, 1889)
- Emathea subrugosa (Jacoby, 1896)
- Emathea violaceipennis (Baly, 1890)
