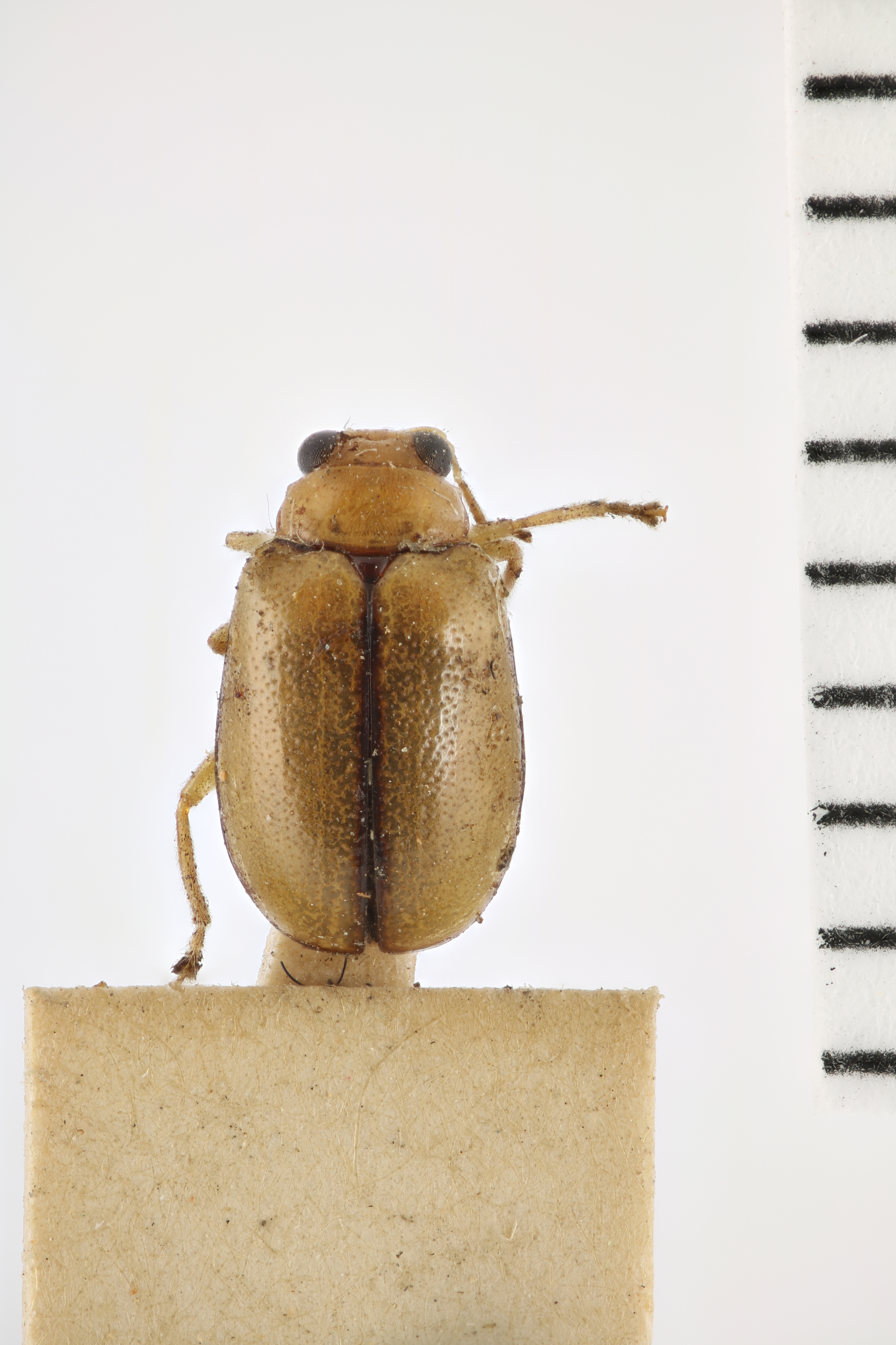
- Dercetina bretinghami

Scientific classification
- Kingdom: Animalia
- Phylum: Arthropoda
- Clade: Pancrustacea
- Class: Insecta
- Order: Coleoptera
- Suborder: Polyphaga
- Infraorder: Cucujiformia
- Family: Chrysomelidae
- Subfamily: Galerucinae
- Tribe: Hylaspini
- Genus: Dercetina; Gressitt & Kimoto, 1963

Synonyms
- Dercetis Clark, 1865 (preocc.); Antipha Baly, 1865; Derectis Jacoby, 1892; Dercetes Weise, 1913

= Dercetina =

Genus of leaf beetles

Dercetina is a genus of beetles belonging to the family Chrysomelidae.

== Species ==
- Dercetina abdominalis (Jacoby, 1884)
- Dercetina amoena (Weise, 1922)
- Dercetina antennata (Jacoby, 1892)
- Dercetina apicata (Jacoby, 1894)
- Dercetina apicicornis (Weise, 1926)
- Dercetina apicipennis (Jacoby, 1887)
- Dercetina apicipes (Jacoby, 1896)
- Dercetina azumai Kimoto & Gressitt, 1966
- Dercetina balyi (Jacoby, 1884)
- Dercetina basalis (Jacoby, 1886)
- Dercetina beccarii (Jacoby, 1886)
- Dercetina bifasciata (Clark, 1865)
- Dercetina birmanica (Jacoby, 1889)
- Dercetina blanchardi (Allard, 1891)
- Dercetina bopeng Mohamedsaid, 1999
- Dercetina braekeli (Laboissiere, 1932)
- Dercetina bretinghami (Baly, 1879)
- Dercetina candezei (Duvivier, 1885)
- Dercetina capitata (Jacoby, 1884)
- Dercetina carinipennis Gressitt & Kimoto, 1963
- Dercetina castanea (Jacoby, 1896)
- Dercetina celebensis (Jacoby, 1886)
- Dercetina chiengmaica Kimoto, 1989
- Dercetina chinensis (Weise, 1889)
- Dercetina collina (Weise, 1924)
- Dercetina costata (Baly, 1879)
- Dercetina cruciata (Jacoby, 1896)
- Dercetina cyanipennis (Chen, 1942)
- Dercetina depressa (Clark, 1865)
- Dercetina dilaticornis (Jacoby, 1884)
- Dercetina dimidiaticornis (Jacoby, 1891)
- Dercetina discoidalis (Baly, 1879)
- Dercetina femoralis (Weise, 1922)
- Dercetina flavescens (Allard, 1889)
- Dercetina flavifrons (Jacoby, 1886)
- Dercetina flaviventris (Jacoby, 1890)
- Dercetina flavocincta (Hope, 1831)
- Dercetina frontalis (Baly, 1879)
- Dercetina fruhstorferi (Jacoby, 1895)
- Dercetina fulvomaculata Takizawa, 1990
- Dercetina fulvomaculata Takizawa, 1990
- Dercetina hainana (Gressitt & Kimoto, 1963)
- Dercetina histrio (Baly, 1879)
- Dercetina inclusa (Jacoby, 1896)
- Dercetina indica (Duvivier, 1891)
- Dercetina inornata (Jacoby, 1892)
- Dercetina itoi Kimoto, 1969
- Dercetina laetifica (Weise, 1922)
- Dercetina laevicollis (Jacoby, 1892)
- Dercetina latefasciata (Jacoby, 1896)
- Dercetina longicornis (Jacoby, 1894)
- Dercetina mandarensis (Jacoby, 1900)
- Dercetina marginella (Allard, 1889)
- Dercetina marginicollis (Jacoby, 1895)
- Dercetina melanocephala Mohamedsaid, 1999
- Dercetina metallica (Weise, 1922)
- Dercetina miniaticollis (Hope, 1831)
- Dercetina minor Gressitt & Kimoto, 1963
- Dercetina modesta (Allard, 1889)
- Dercetina multicolor (Jacoby, 1887)
- Dercetina nakanei Kimoto, 1969
- Dercetina nathani Takizawa, 1985
- Dercetina nictneri Baly, 1879
- Dercetina nigricornis (Weise, 1922)
- Dercetina obesa (Laboissiere, 1932)
- Dercetina obsoleta (Allard, 1889)
- Dercetina orientalis (Jacoby, 1904)
- Dercetina ornata (Jacoby, 1891)
- Dercetina pallida (Allard, 1889)
- Dercetina permagna Kimoto, 1989
- Dercetina picipes (Baly, 1865)
- Dercetina posticata (Baly, 1879)
- Dercetina pretiosa (Baly, 1879)
- Dercetina pulchella (Baly, 1879)
- Dercetina punctata (Allard, 1889)
- Dercetina purpurea (Bryant, 1954)
- Dercetina quadrimaculata (Jacoby, 1891)
- Dercetina quadriplagiata (Allard, 1889)
- Dercetina rufipennis (Weise, 1922)
- Dercetina rugosa Medvedev, 2000
- Dercetina sangirensis (Jacoby, 1894)
- Dercetina seminigra (Jacoby, 1884)
- Dercetina shirozui Kimoto, 1969
- Dercetina shona (Maulik, 1936)
- Dercetina similis (Jacoby, 1896)
- Dercetina soluta (Weise, 1913)
- Dercetina subcaerulea (Jacoby, 1891)
- Dercetina subrugosa (Jacoby, 1895)
- Dercetina taeniata (Weise, 1924)
- Dercetina tenuimarginata (Jacoby, 1896)
- Dercetina terminata (Allard, 1889)
- Dercetina tibialis (Allard, 1889)
- Dercetina travancorensis (Maulik, 1936)
- Dercetina tricolor (Chujo, 1965)
- Dercetina unicolor (Bryant, 1954)
- Dercetina unifasciata (Allard, 1889)
- Dercetina variabilis (Jacoby, 1886)
- Dercetina varipennis (Jacoby, 1890)
- Dercetina varipes (Laboissiere, 1925)
- Dercetina viridipennis (Duvivier, 1887)
- Dercetina wallacei (Jacoby, 1899)
- Dercetina wallardia (Maulik, 1936)
