= Laphris =

Scientific classification
- Kingdom: Animalia
- Phylum: Arthropoda
- Clade: Pancrustacea
- Class: Insecta
- Order: Coleoptera
- Suborder: Polyphaga
- Infraorder: Cucujiformia
- Family: Chrysomelidae
- Subfamily: Galerucinae
- Tribe: Hylaspini
- Genus: Laphris; Baly, 1864

Synonyms
- Neohylaspes Chûjô, 1962

Genus of leaf beetles

Laphris is a genus of beetles belonging to the family Chrysomelidae.

== Species ==
- Laphris apophysata Yang, 1993
- Laphris collaris Yang in Yang, 1992
- Laphris collaris Yang, 1993
- Laphris emarginata (Baly, 1864)
- Laphris sexplagiata Laboissiere, 1934
- Laphris tricuspidata Yang, 1993
