= Doryidomorpha =

Scientific classification
- Kingdom: Animalia
- Phylum: Arthropoda
- Clade: Pancrustacea
- Class: Insecta
- Order: Coleoptera
- Suborder: Polyphaga
- Infraorder: Cucujiformia
- Family: Chrysomelidae
- Subfamily: Galerucinae
- Tribe: Hylaspini
- Genus: Doryidomorpha; Laboissière, 1931

Genus of leaf beetles

Doryidomorpha is a genus of beetles belonging to the family Chrysomelidae.

== Species ==
- Doryidomorpha frontalis Laboissiere, 1931
- Doryidomorpha fulva (Laboissiere, 1931)
- Doryidomorpha nigripennis (Laboissiere, 1931)
- Doryidomorpha pilifrons Laboissiere, 1931
- Doryidomorpha souyrisi (Laboissiere, 1931)
- Doryidomorpha variabilis (Laboissiere, 1931)
