= Hamushia =

Scientific classification
- Kingdom: Animalia
- Phylum: Arthropoda
- Clade: Pancrustacea
- Class: Insecta
- Order: Coleoptera
- Suborder: Polyphaga
- Infraorder: Cucujiformia
- Family: Chrysomelidae
- Subfamily: Galerucinae
- Tribe: Hylaspini
- Genus: Hamushia; Chûjô, 1956

Genus of leaf beetles

Hamushia is a genus of beetles belonging to the family Chrysomelidae.

== Species ==
- Hamushia eburata (Harold, 1879)
- Hamushia konishii Chujo, 1956
