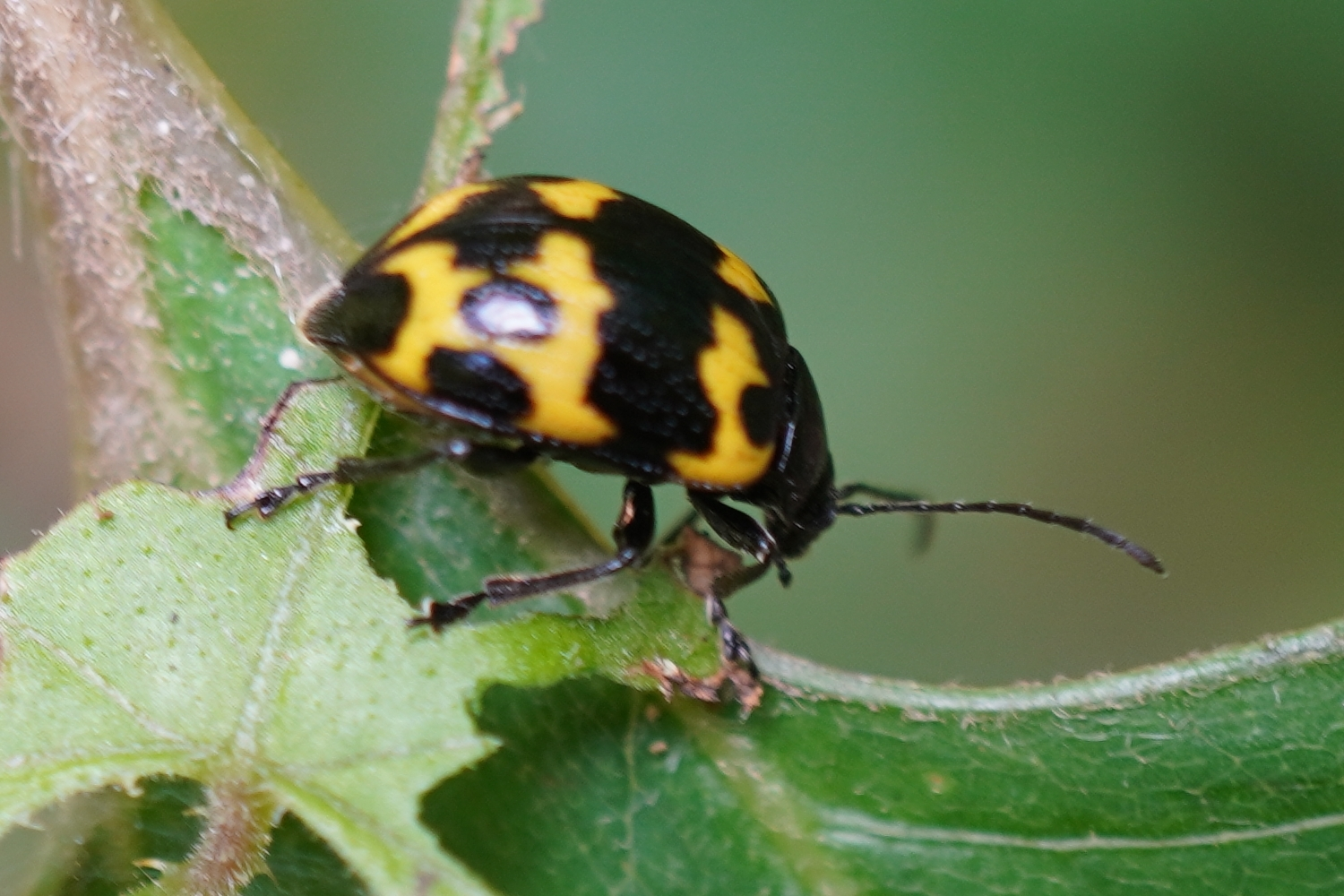
- Gallerucida bifasciata, Japanese knotweed leaf beetle, South Korea

Scientific classification
- Kingdom: Animalia
- Phylum: Arthropoda
- Clade: Pancrustacea
- Class: Insecta
- Order: Coleoptera
- Suborder: Polyphaga
- Infraorder: Cucujiformia
- Family: Chrysomelidae
- Subfamily: Galerucinae
- Tribe: Hylaspini
- Genus: Gallerucida; Motschulsky, 1861

Synonyms
- Eustetha Baly, 1861; Melospila Baly, 1861; Hylaspes Baly, 1865; Stethidea Baly, 1890; Coptomesa Weise, 1912

= Gallerucida =

Genus of leaf beetles

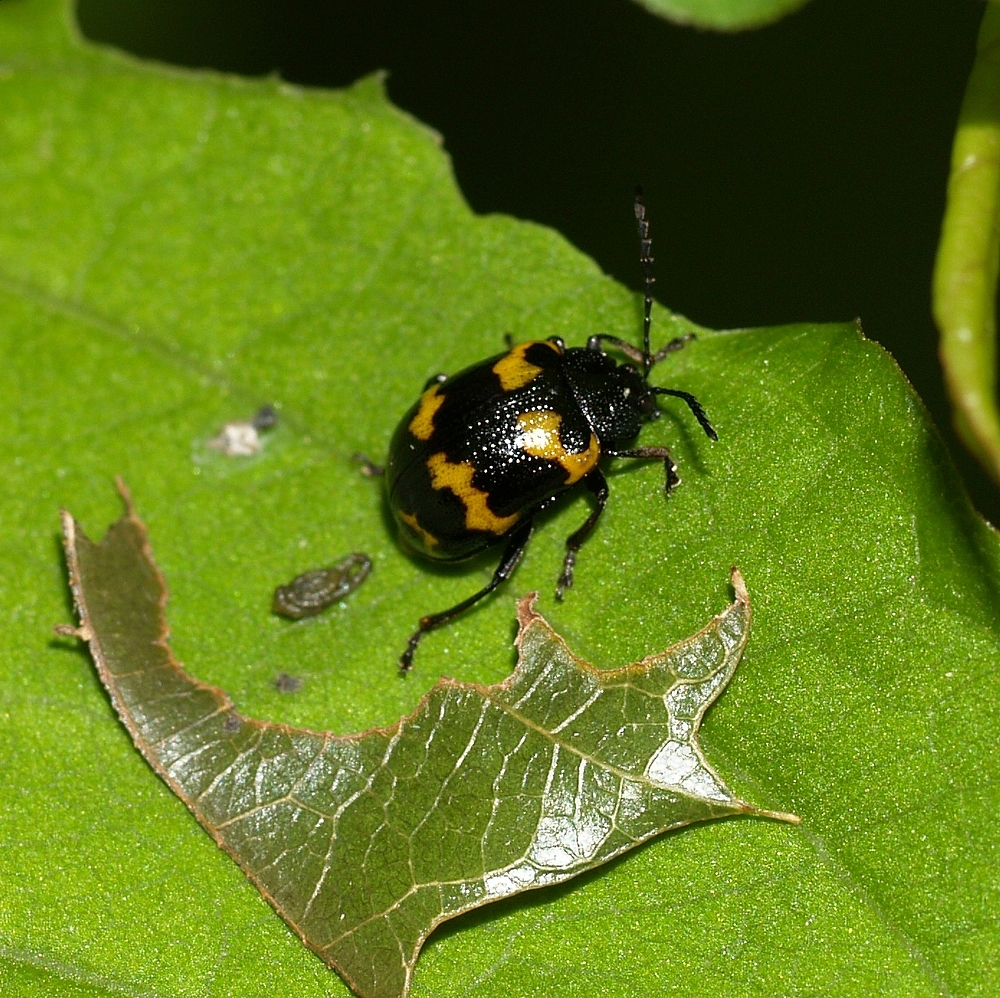
Gallerucida bifasciata, Japanese knotweed leaf beetle

Gallerucida is a genus of skeletonizing leaf beetles in the family Chrysomelidae. There are at least 19 described species in Gallerucida. They are found in Indomalaya and eastern Asia.

== Species ==
- Gallerucida abdominalis (Gressitt & Kimoto, 1963)
- Gallerucida achala Maulik, 1936
- Gallerucida aenea (Laboissiere, 1934)
- Gallerucida aeneomicans (Ogloblin, 1936)
- Gallerucida aenescens (Weise, 1889)
- Gallerucida apicalis (Laboissiere, 1934)
- Gallerucida apicipennis (Duvivier, 1885)
- Gallerucida apurvella Yang, 1994
- Gallerucida asticha Yang in Li, Zhang & Xiang, 1997
- Gallerucida balyi (Duvivier, 1885)
- Gallerucida basalis Chen in Chen, 1992
- Gallerucida bifasciata (Motschulsky, 1860) (Japanese knotweed leaf beetle)
- Gallerucida bimaculata (Laboissiere, 1934)
- Gallerucida binotata Takizawa, 1988
- Gallerucida birmanica Bryant, 1954
- Gallerucida chanchala Maulik, 1936
- Gallerucida chunia Maulik, 1936
- Gallerucida confusa (Ogloblin, 1936)
- Gallerucida emeishanica Lopatin, 2005
- Gallerucida erythroptera Yang in Yang, 1992
- Gallerucida flava (Ogloblin, 1936)
- Gallerucida flavipennis (Solsky, 1872)
- Gallerucida flaviventris (Baly, 1861)
- Gallerucida fulva (Laboissere, 1931)
- Gallerucida furvofovea Yang in Yang, 1992
- Gallerucida gansuica (Chen, 1942)
- Gallerucida gebieni Weise, 1922
- Gallerucida gloriosa (Baly, 1861)
- Gallerucida haroldi (Weise, 1912)
- Gallerucida heilongjiangana Yang, 1994
- Gallerucida indica (Harold, 1880)
- Gallerucida lankana (Medvedev, 2003)
- Gallerucida laosensis Kimoto, 1989
- Gallerucida lewisi (Jacoby, 1885)
- Gallerucida limbata (Baly, 1878)
- Gallerucida limbatella Chen in Chen, 1992
- Gallerucida lutea (Gressitt & Kimoto, 1963)
- Gallerucida maculata (Weise, 1924)
- Gallerucida magica (Harold, 1880)
- Gallerucida malaisei Bryant, 1954
- Gallerucida maxima (Gressitt & Kimoto, 1963)
- Gallerucida monticola Bryant, 1954
- Gallerucida moseri (Weise, 1922)
- Gallerucida nigricornis (Laboissiere, 1940)
- Gallerucida nigrofoveolata (Fairmaire, 1889)
- Gallerucida nigropicta (Fairmaire, 1888)
- Gallerucida nigropunctatoides (Mader, 1938)
- Gallerucida nothornata Yang, 1994
- Gallerucida ornata (Laboissiere, 1932)
- Gallerucida ornatipennis (Duvivier, 1885)
- Gallerucida oshimana Kimoto & Gressitt, 1966
- Gallerucida pallida (Laboissiere, 1934)
- Gallerucida parva Chen in Chen, 1992
- Gallerucida pectoralis (Laboissiere, 1934)
- Gallerucida podontioides (Chen, 1942)
- Gallerucida posticalis (Laboissiere, 1934)
- Gallerucida postifusca Yang, 1994
- Gallerucida puncticollis (Fairmaire, 1888)
- Gallerucida quadraticollis Takizawa, 1978
- Gallerucida reflecta (Laboissiere, 1934)
- Gallerucida reflexa (Gressitt & Kimoto, 1963)
- Gallerucida rubrozonata (Fairmaire, 1889)
- Gallerucida rufometallica (Gressitt & Kimoto, 1963)
- Gallerucida sauteri Chujo, 1938
- Gallerucida serricornis (Fairmaire, 1888)
- Gallerucida shirozui Kimoto, 1969
- Gallerucida simplex (Weise, 1922)
- Gallerucida singularis (Harold, 1880)
- Gallerucida sinica Yang, 1994
- Gallerucida solenocephala Yang, 1994
- Gallerucida speciosa (Laboissiere, 1934)
- Gallerucida spectabilis (Laboissiere, 1934)
- Gallerucida submetallica (Gressitt & Kimoto, 1963)
- Gallerucida tenuefasciata (Fairmaire, 1888)
- Gallerucida tenuicornis (Weise, 1922)
- Gallerucida thoracica (Jacoby, 1888)
- Gallerucida tibialis (Laboissiere, 1931)
- Gallerucida tienmushana (Gressitt & Kimoto, 1963)
- Gallerucida tonkinensis (Laboissiere, 1934)
- Gallerucida tricinicta (Laboissiere, 1934)
- Gallerucida tricolor Gressitt & Kimoto, 1963
- Gallerucida trinotata Gressitt & Kimoto, 1963
- Gallerucida variabilis (Jacoby, 1884)
- Gallerucida varians (Allard, 1891)
- Gallerucida variolosa (Laboissiere, 1938)
