= Doryidella =

Scientific classification
- Kingdom: Animalia
- Phylum: Arthropoda
- Clade: Pancrustacea
- Class: Insecta
- Order: Coleoptera
- Suborder: Polyphaga
- Infraorder: Cucujiformia
- Family: Chrysomelidae
- Subfamily: Galerucinae
- Tribe: Hylaspini
- Genus: Doryidella; Laboissière, 1940

Genus of leaf beetles

Doryidella is a genus of beetles belonging to the family Chrysomelidae.

== Species ==
- Doryidella minor Kimoto, 1989
- Doryidella pallida (Jacoby, 1892)
