= Doryida =

Scientific classification
- Kingdom: Animalia
- Phylum: Arthropoda
- Clade: Pancrustacea
- Class: Insecta
- Order: Coleoptera
- Suborder: Polyphaga
- Infraorder: Cucujiformia
- Family: Chrysomelidae
- Subfamily: Galerucinae
- Tribe: Hylaspini
- Genus: Doryida; Baly, 1865

Genus of leaf beetles

Doryida is a genus of beetles belonging to the family Chrysomelidae.

== Species ==
- Doryida fraterna (Laboissiere, 1931)
- Doryida mouhoti Baly, 1865
- Doryida nigripennis Baly, 1890
- Doryida tarsalis Baly, 1890
