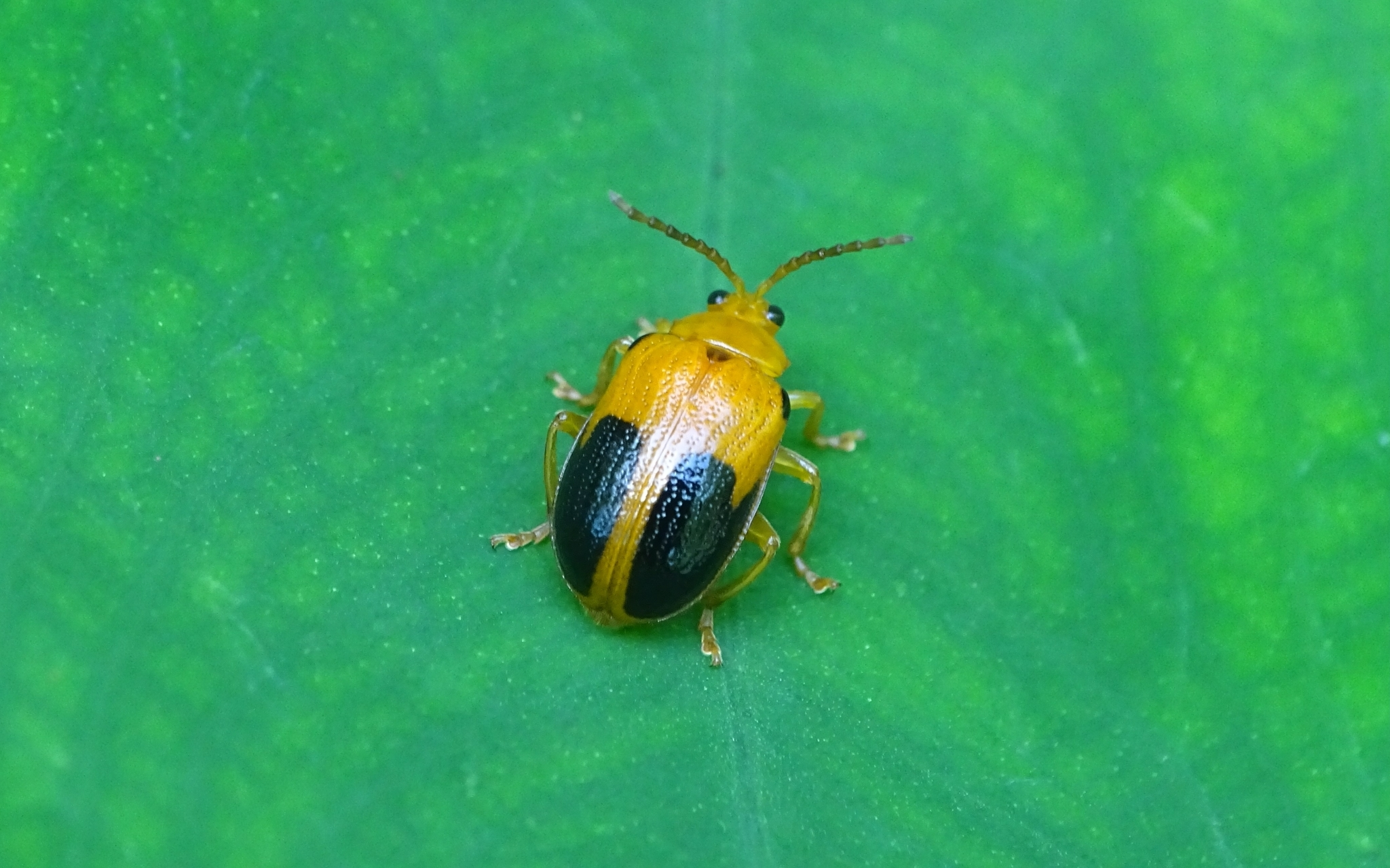
- Sphenoraia hopei, India

Scientific classification
- Kingdom: Animalia
- Phylum: Arthropoda
- Clade: Pancrustacea
- Class: Insecta
- Order: Coleoptera
- Suborder: Polyphaga
- Infraorder: Cucujiformia
- Family: Chrysomelidae
- Subfamily: Galerucinae
- Tribe: Hylaspini
- Genus: Sphenoraia; Clark, 1865

Synonyms
- Neosermylassa Chûjô, 1956; Sphenoraioides Laboissière, 1934

= Sphenoraia =

Genus of leaf beetles

Sphenoraia is a genus of skeletonizing leaf beetles in the family Chrysomelidae. There are about 24 described species in Sphenoraia. They are found in Indomalaya and the Palaearctic.

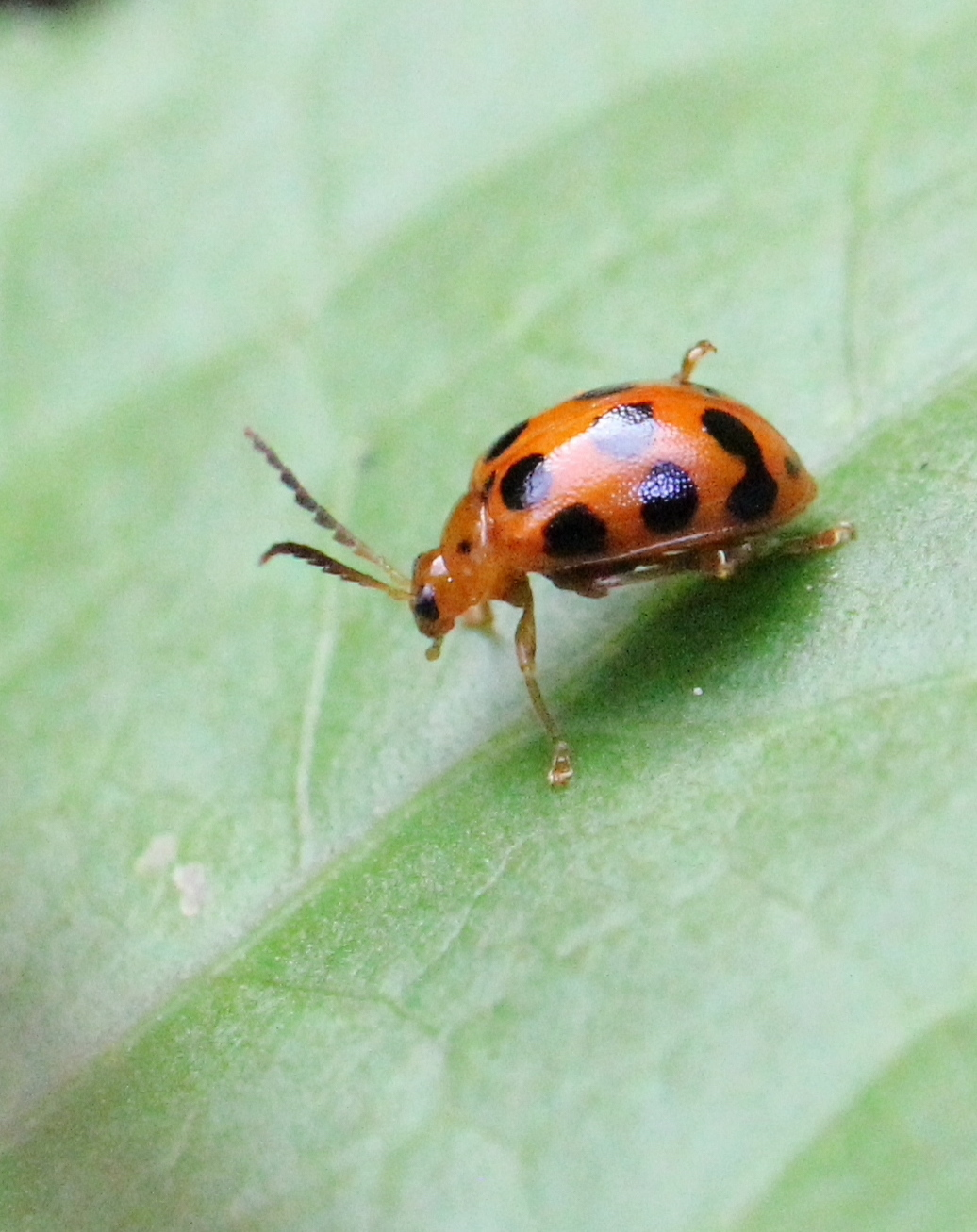
Sphenoraia nebulosa, China

== Species ==
These 12 species are among those that belong to the genus Sphenoraia:

- Sphenoraia apicalis Kimoto & Takizawa, 1983
- Sphenoraia chujoi Lee, 2014
- Sphenoraia duodecimmaculata Jacoby, 1889
- Sphenoraia hopei Beenen, 2005
- Sphenoraia imitans Jacoby, 1892
- Sphenoraia intermedia Jacoby, 1885
- Sphenoraia javana (Wiedemann, 1819)
- Sphenoraia micans (Fairmair, 1888)
- Sphenoraia nebulosa (Gyllenhaal, 1808)
- Sphenoraia nigra Wang, Li & Yang, 2000
- Sphenoraia rutilans (Hope, 1831)
