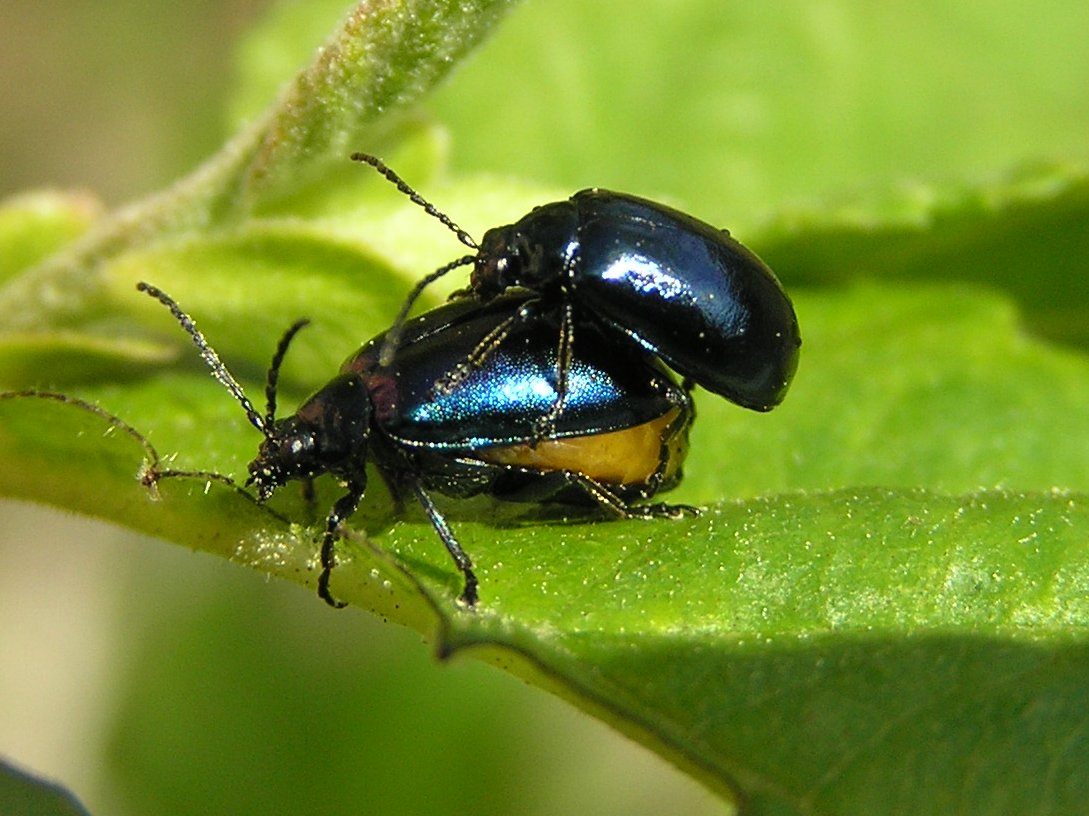
- Agelastica alni

Scientific classification
- Kingdom: Animalia
- Phylum: Arthropoda
- Clade: Pancrustacea
- Class: Insecta
- Order: Coleoptera
- Suborder: Polyphaga
- Infraorder: Cucujiformia
- Family: Chrysomelidae
- Subfamily: Galerucinae
- Tribe: Hylaspini
- Genus: Agelastica; Chevrolat, 1836

Type species
- Chrysomela alni Linnaeus, 1758

Synonyms
- Scholastica Gistel, 1848

= Agelastica =

Genus of beetles

Agelastica is a genus of beetles in the family Chrysomelidae.

== Species ==
- Agelastica alni (Linnaeus, 1758) – Europe, Russia (Siberia), Kazakhstan
- Agelastica coerulea Baly, 1860 – Japan, China, Russia (Siberia)
- Agelastica cyanicollis (Jacoby, 1884)* – Indonesia (Sumatra)
- Agelastica lineata Blackburn, 1888* – Australia

Note: (*) The latter two species were not mentioned in the Catalogue of Palaearctic Coleoptera, either by Beenen, 2010 (In: Löbl & Smetana, 2010 Eds.), nor update in Bezděk & Sekerka, 2024. This may be as both extralimital origins. Both were mentioned as ’'Incertae sedis'’ in Vassiliades et al. 2025.

Else Agelastica bimaculata (Bertoloni, 1868) is recombined as Hallirhotius bimaculata (Bertoloni, 1868) in Beenen, 2000. Further Agelastica orientalis (Baly, 1878) is a junior subjective synonym of Agelastica alni ssp. glabra (Fischer von Waldheim, 1842) in Bezděk, 2015: 33.
