= Arthrotidea =

Scientific classification
- Kingdom: Animalia
- Phylum: Arthropoda
- Clade: Pancrustacea
- Class: Insecta
- Order: Coleoptera
- Suborder: Polyphaga
- Infraorder: Cucujiformia
- Family: Chrysomelidae
- Subfamily: Galerucinae
- Tribe: Hylaspini
- Genus: Arthrotidea; Chen, 1942

Genus of leaf beetles

Arthrotidea is a genus of beetles belonging to the family Chrysomelidae.

== Species ==
- Arthrotidea cheni Xingke, 1996
- Arthrotidea luoxuensis Xingke, 1996
- Arthrotidea rubrica Chen & Jiang, 1981
- Arthrotidea ruficollis Chen, 1942
- Arthrotidea scutellaris Jiang, 1988
