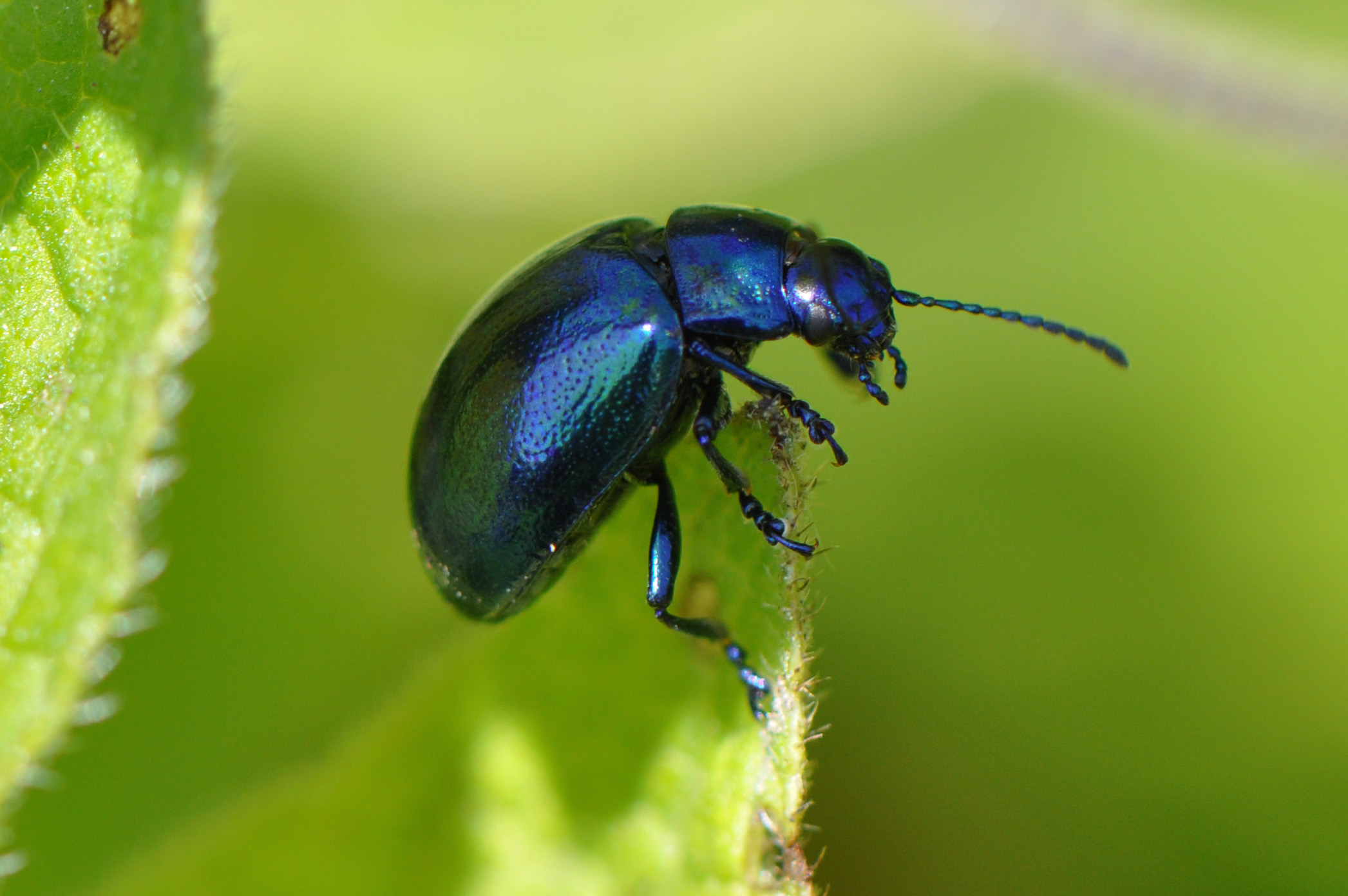

Scientific classification
- Kingdom: Animalia
- Phylum: Arthropoda
- Class: Insecta
- Order: Coleoptera
- Suborder: Polyphaga
- Infraorder: Cucujiformia
- Family: Chrysomelidae
- Genus: Agelastica
- Species: A. alni

Binomial name
- Agelastica alni (Linnaeus, 1758)
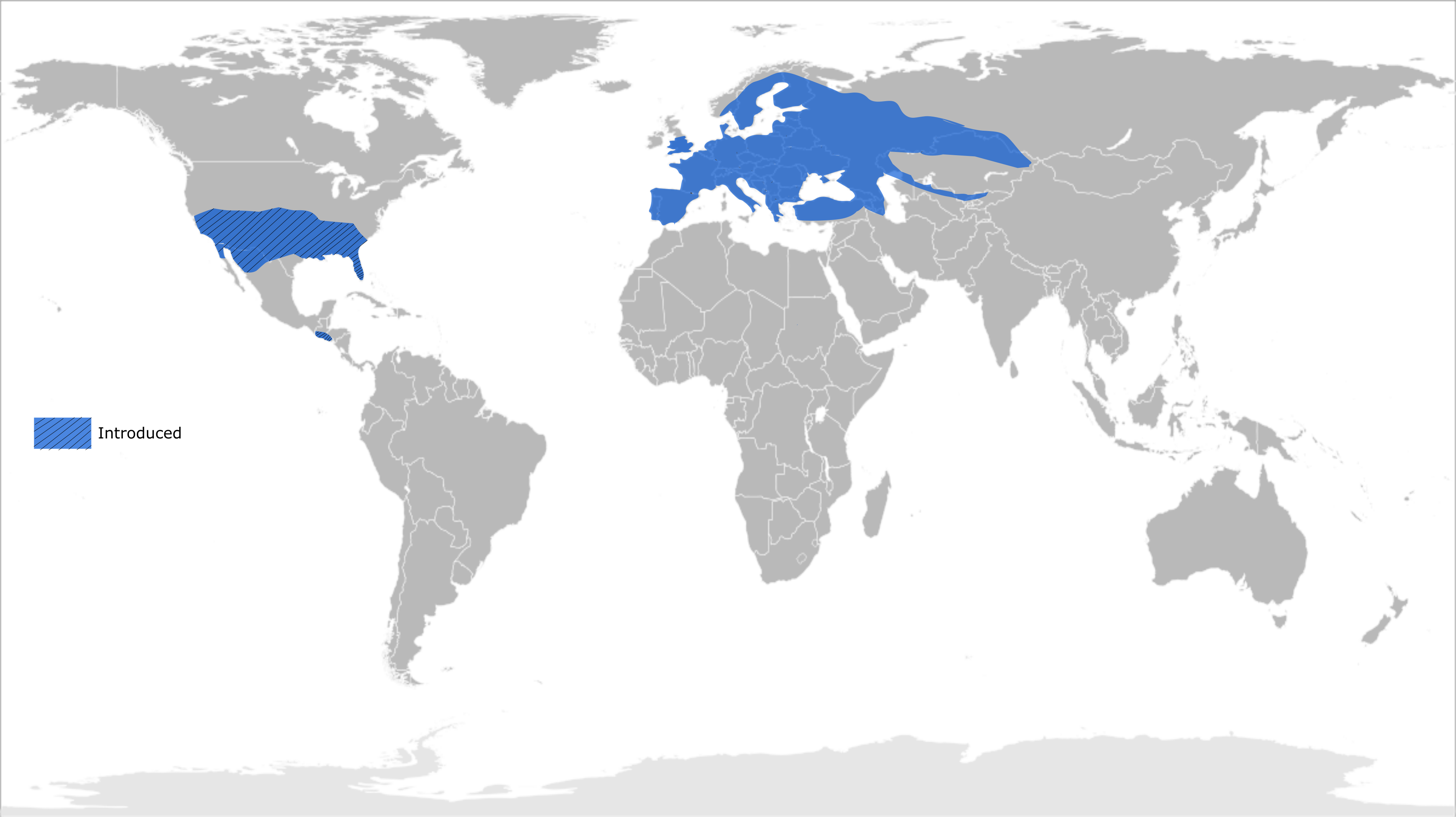

Synonyms
- sensu stricto: Adimonia violacea Laicharting, 1781; Cryptocephalus violacea Geoffroy, 1762; Chrysomela alni Linnaeus, 1758; glabra: Adimonia glabra Fischer von Waldheim, 1842; Agelastica sillemi Laboissière, 1935; Agelastica orientalis Baly, 1878

= Agelastica alni =

Species of beetle

Agelastica alni, the alder leaf beetle, is a species of leaf beetle (Chrysomelidae) in the genus Agelastica. Agelastica alni is distributed in Europe, the Caucasus, Siberia, north-eastern Kazakhstan, and in the 19th century was introduced to the United States.

The beetle and the beetle's larval host is the grey or speckled alder (Alnus incana) and to a lesser extent black alder (Alnus glutinosa), but it will also be found on hazel, birch or hornbeam if there is a shortage of food. It causes large holes and gaps in leaves from the end of April onwards, which are produced by the larvae in the first two stages, but the main damage is produced by larvae in the third stage.

Previously rare, and considered extinct in the UK, since being found in Manchester in 2004 it appears to be on the increase in the North West of England. Its range has been extending and it was found in Nottinghamshire and Hampshire in 2014 and in North Wales in 2018. This beetle has now been seen in North Yorkshire as of 29-09-24. Seen in York as of 15.5.25

== Description ==
The alder leaf beetle is a relatively small beetle, around 6–7 mm, black or metallic blue in colour. The winged adults overwinter and emerge in the spring. There is one generation each year. The larvae are normally black. Although the damage to alder trees can be unsightly, the trees will usually tolerate the damage.

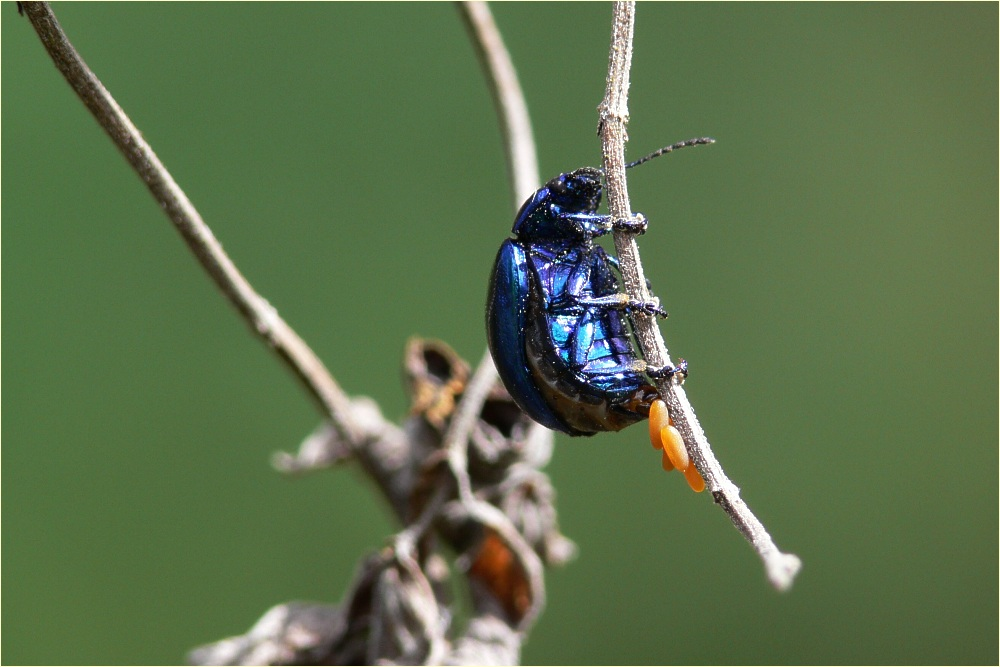
Alder leaf beetle laying eggs.

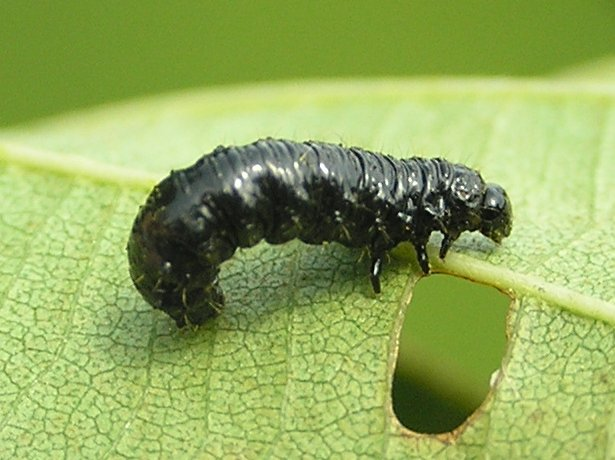
Larva of the alder leaf beetle

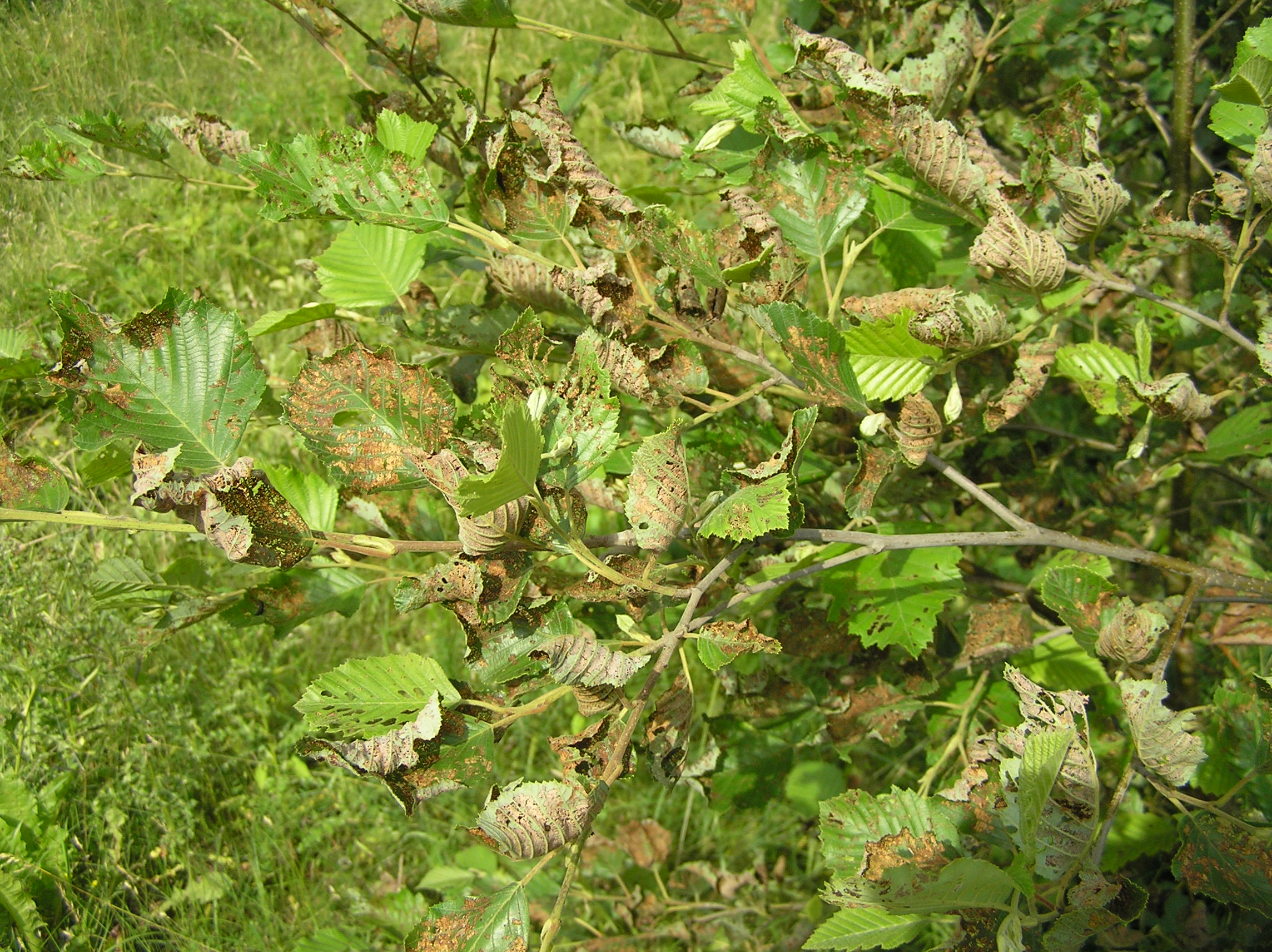
The skeletonized remains of a black alder

Video of a pregnant female on alder

Video of a Agelastica alni in Germany

== Subspecies ==
There are two subspecies of Agelastica alni:

- A. a. alni (Linnaeus, 1758)
- A. a. glabra (Fischer von Waldheim, 1842) (formerly known as A. a. orientalis Baly, 1878 until 2015)
