= Proegmena =

Scientific classification
- Kingdom: Animalia
- Phylum: Arthropoda
- Clade: Pancrustacea
- Class: Insecta
- Order: Coleoptera
- Suborder: Polyphaga
- Infraorder: Cucujiformia
- Family: Chrysomelidae
- Subfamily: Galerucinae
- Tribe: Hylaspini
- Genus: Proegmena; Weise, 1889

Genus of leaf beetles

Proegmena is a genus of beetles belonging to the family Chrysomelidae.

== Species ==
- Proegmena bipunctata (Chen, 1942)
- Proegmena impressicollis (Jacoby, 1891)
- Proegmena pallidipennis Weise, 1889
- Proegmena smaragdina (Gressitt & Kimoto, 1963)
- Proegmena taiwana Takizawa, 1978
