= Dercetisoma =

Scientific classification
- Kingdom: Animalia
- Phylum: Arthropoda
- Clade: Pancrustacea
- Class: Insecta
- Order: Coleoptera
- Suborder: Polyphaga
- Infraorder: Cucujiformia
- Family: Chrysomelidae
- Subfamily: Galerucinae
- Tribe: Hylaspini
- Genus: Dercetisoma; Maulik, 1936

Genus of leaf beetles

Dercetisoma is a genus of beetles belonging to the family Chrysomelidae.

== Species ==
- Dercetisoma concolor (Jacoby, 1889)
- Dercetisoma khonkaenicum Kimoto, 1989
- Dercetisoma nepalica Medvedev & Sprecher-Uebersax, 1998
- Dercetisoma puncticollis (Jacoby, 1889)
