= Spitiella =

Scientific classification
- Kingdom: Animalia
- Phylum: Arthropoda
- Clade: Pancrustacea
- Class: Insecta
- Order: Coleoptera
- Suborder: Polyphaga
- Infraorder: Cucujiformia
- Family: Chrysomelidae
- Subfamily: Galerucinae
- Tribe: Hylaspini
- Genus: Spitiella; Laboissière, 1931

Genus of leaf beetles

Spitiella is a genus of beetles belonging to the family Chrysomelidae.

== Species ==
- Spitiella collaris (Baly, 1878)
- Spitiella maculipennis
