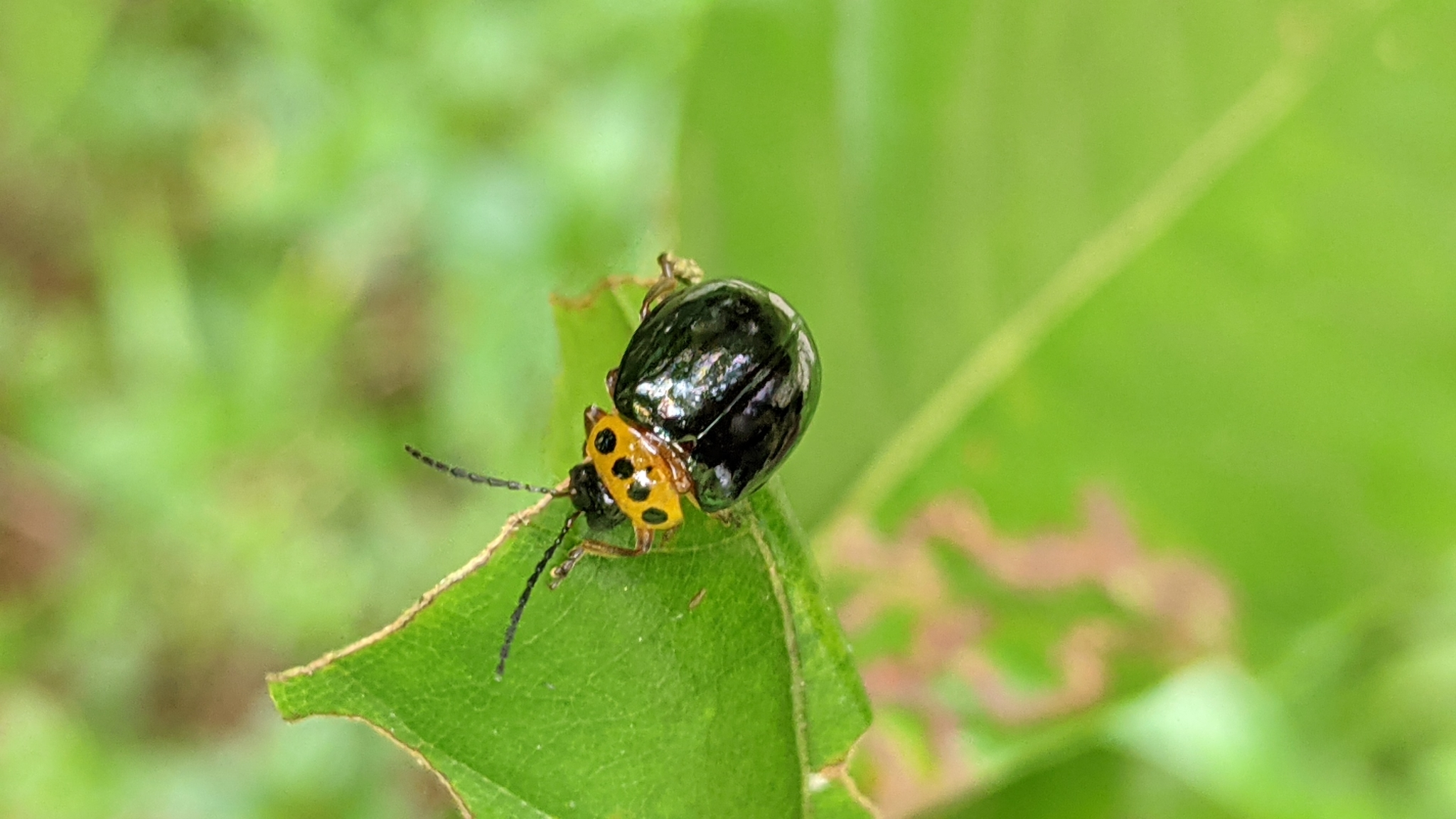
- Morphosphaera chrysomeloides, Taiwan

Scientific classification
- Kingdom: Animalia
- Phylum: Arthropoda
- Clade: Pancrustacea
- Class: Insecta
- Order: Coleoptera
- Suborder: Polyphaga
- Infraorder: Cucujiformia
- Family: Chrysomelidae
- Subfamily: Galerucinae
- Tribe: Hylaspini
- Genus: Morphosphaera; Baly, 1861

= Morphosphaera =

Genus of leaf beetles

Morphosphaera is a genus of skeletonizing leaf beetles in the family Chrysomelidae. There are about 11 described species in Morphosphaera. They are found in Indomalaya and eastern Asia.

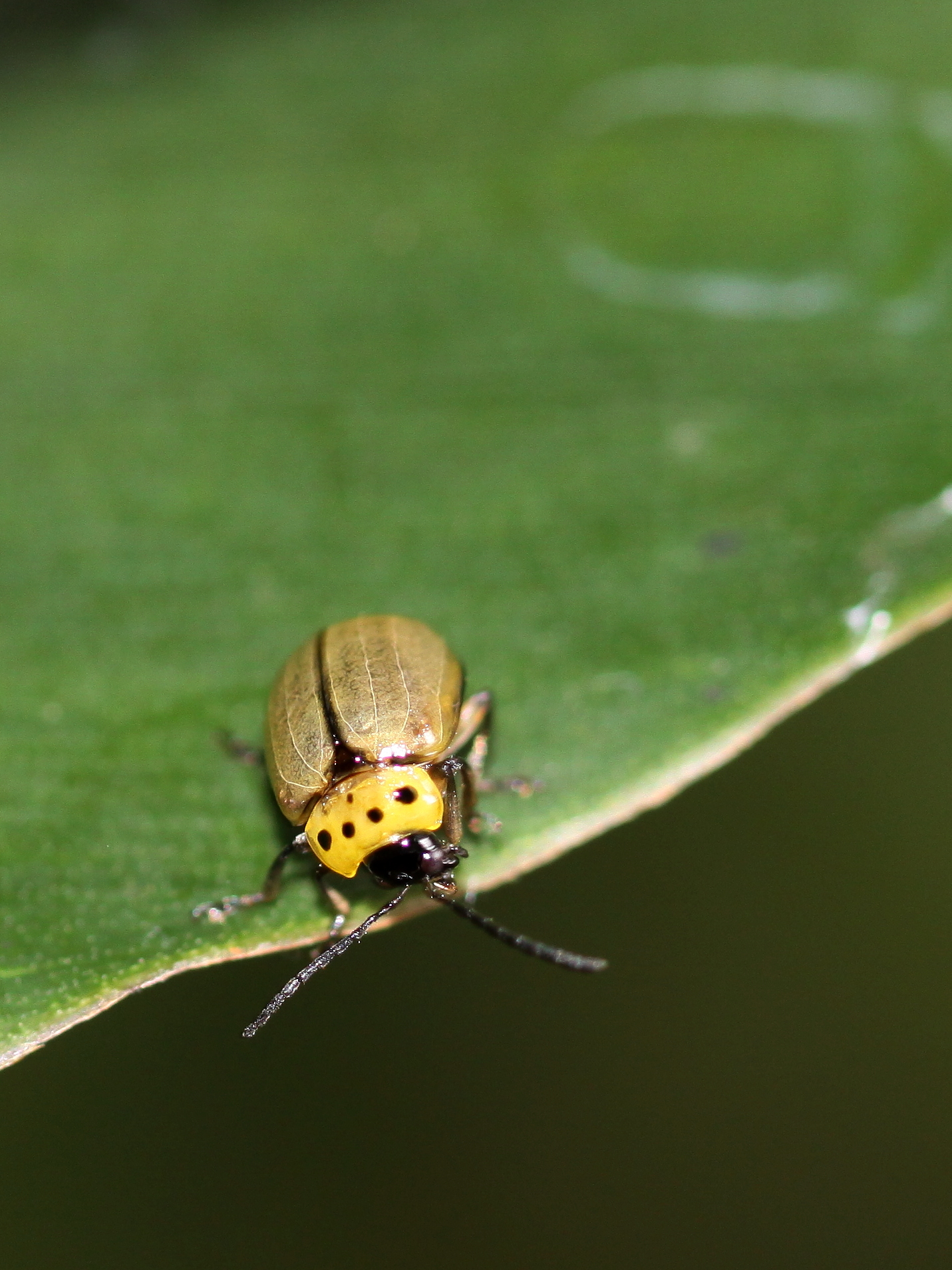
Morphosphaera sumatrana, Indonesia

== Species ==
These 11 species belong to the genus Morphosphaera:

- Morphosphaera albipennis Allard, 1889
- Morphosphaera bimaculata Chujo, 1938
- Morphosphaera caerulea (Schönfeldt, 1890)
- Morphosphaera chrysomeloides (Bates, 1866)
- Morphosphaera collaris Laboissière, 1930
- Morphosphaera coomani Laboissière, 1930
- Morphosphaera japonica (Hornstedt, 1788)
- Morphosphaera maculicollis Baly, 1861
- Morphosphaera montivaga Maulik, 1936
- Morphosphaera sumatrana Jacoby, 1886
- Morphosphaera takizawai Lee & Bezdĕk, 2016
