= Arthrotus =

Scientific classification
- Kingdom: Animalia
- Phylum: Arthropoda
- Clade: Pancrustacea
- Class: Insecta
- Order: Coleoptera
- Suborder: Polyphaga
- Infraorder: Cucujiformia
- Family: Chrysomelidae
- Subfamily: Galerucinae
- Tribe: Hylaspini
- Genus: Arthrotus; Motschulsky, 1857

Synonyms
- Cerotrus Jacoby, 1884; Anicera Jacoby, 1884; Taphinella Jacoby, 1889; Anastena Maulik, 1936; Dercestra Chûjô, 1962

Genus of leaf beetles

Arthrotus is a genus of beetles belonging to the family Chrysomelidae.

== Species ==
- Arthrotus abdominalis (Chujo, 1962)
- Arthrotus antennalis Laboissiere, 1932
- Arthrotus baliensis Mohamedsaid, 2001
- Arthrotus bipartitus (Jacoby, 1890)
- Arthrotus brownelli (Gressitt & Kimoto, 1963)
- Arthrotus chinensis (Baly, 1879)
- Arthrotus coerulea (Chen, 1942)
- Arthrotus coomani Laboissiere, 1932
- Arthrotus duporti Laboissiere, 1932
- Arthrotus elongatus (Gressitt & Kimoto, 1963)
- Arthrotus freyi (Gressitt & Kimoto, 1963)
- Arthrotus frontalis Laboissiere, 1932
- Arthrotus fulvus Chujo, 1938
- Arthrotus gressitti Kimoto, 1969
- Arthrotus hauseri Kimoto, 1967
- Arthrotus hirashimai Kimoto, 1969
- Arthrotus kalimponganus Kimoto, 2004
- Arthrotus liquidus (Gressitt & Kimoto, 1963)
- Arthrotus maai (Gressitt & Kimoto, 1963)
- Arthrotus micans (Chen, 1942)
- Arthrotus montanus Medvedev, 2000
- Arthrotus niger Motschulsky, 1857
- Arthrotus nigricollis (Chen, 1942)
- Arthrotus nigrofasciatus (Jacoby, 1890)
- Arthrotus nigromaculata (Jacoby, 1896)
- Arthrotus ochreipennis (Gressitt & Kimoto, 1963)
- Arthrotus pallidus Laboissiere, 1932
- Arthrotus phaseoli Laboissiere, 1932
- Arthrotus pumilus Laboissiere, 1932
- Arthrotus purpureus (Gressitt & Kimoto, 1963)
- Arthrotus saigusai Kimoto, 1969
- Arthrotus shibatai Kimoto, 1984
- Arthrotus tarsalis Laboissiere, 1932
- Arthrotus testaceus (Gressitt & Kimoto, 1963)
- Arthrotus tonkinensis Laboissiere, 1932
- Arthrotus tricolor (Chûjô, 1965)
- Arthrotus trifasciatus Laboissiere, 1932
- Arthrotus variomaculata (Takizawa, 1986)
- Arthrotus yangi Lee, 2022
- Arthrotus yuae Lee, 2022
