= Munina (beetle) =

Scientific classification
- Kingdom: Animalia
- Phylum: Arthropoda
- Clade: Pancrustacea
- Class: Insecta
- Order: Coleoptera
- Suborder: Polyphaga
- Infraorder: Cucujiformia
- Family: Chrysomelidae
- Subfamily: Galerucinae
- Tribe: Hylaspini
- Genus: Munina; Chen in Chen et al., 1976

Genus of leaf beetles

Munina is a genus of beetles belonging to the family Chrysomelidae.

== Species ==
- Munina blanchardi
- Munina flavida Yang & Yao in Yang, Li & Yao, 1997
- Munina laotica
