= Meristoides =

Scientific classification
- Kingdom: Animalia
- Phylum: Arthropoda
- Clade: Pancrustacea
- Class: Insecta
- Order: Coleoptera
- Suborder: Polyphaga
- Infraorder: Cucujiformia
- Family: Chrysomelidae
- Subfamily: Galerucinae
- Tribe: Hylaspini
- Genus: Meristoides; Laboissière, 1929

Genus of leaf beetles

Meristoides is a genus of beetles belonging to the family Chrysomelidae.

== Species ==
- Meristoides grandipennis (Fairmaire, 1889)
- Meristoides keani Laboissiere, 1929
- Meristoides oberthuri (Jacoby, 1883)
- Meristoides obscurus
- Meristoides rugosus
- Meristoides vigintiguttata (Ogloblin, 1936)
