= Aulamorphus =

Scientific classification
- Kingdom: Animalia
- Phylum: Arthropoda
- Clade: Pancrustacea
- Class: Insecta
- Order: Coleoptera
- Suborder: Polyphaga
- Infraorder: Cucujiformia
- Family: Chrysomelidae
- Subfamily: Galerucinae
- Tribe: Hylaspini
- Genus: Aulamorphus; Jacoby, 1897

Genus of leaf beetles

Aulamorphus is a genus of beetles belonging to the family Chrysomelidae.

== Species ==
- Aulamorphus decoratus (Laboissiere, 1926)
- Aulamorphus flavipes Laboissiere, 1926
- Aulamorphus histrio Laboissiere, 1926
- Aulamorphus hollisi Jacoby, 1897
- Aulamorphus laevipennis Laboissiere, 1926
- Aulamorphus pictus Jacoby, 1906
- Aulamorphus punctatus Laboissiere, 1926
- Aulamorphus similis Laboissiere, 1926
- Aulamorphus variabilis Gahan, 1909
