= Shamshera (beetle) =

Scientific classification
- Kingdom: Animalia
- Phylum: Arthropoda
- Clade: Pancrustacea
- Class: Insecta
- Order: Coleoptera
- Suborder: Polyphaga
- Infraorder: Cucujiformia
- Family: Chrysomelidae
- Subfamily: Galerucinae
- Tribe: Hylaspini
- Genus: Shamshera; Maulik, 1936

Genus of leaf beetles

Shamshera is a genus of beetles belonging to the family Chrysomelidae.

== Species ==
- Shamshera bennetti (Hope, 1831)
