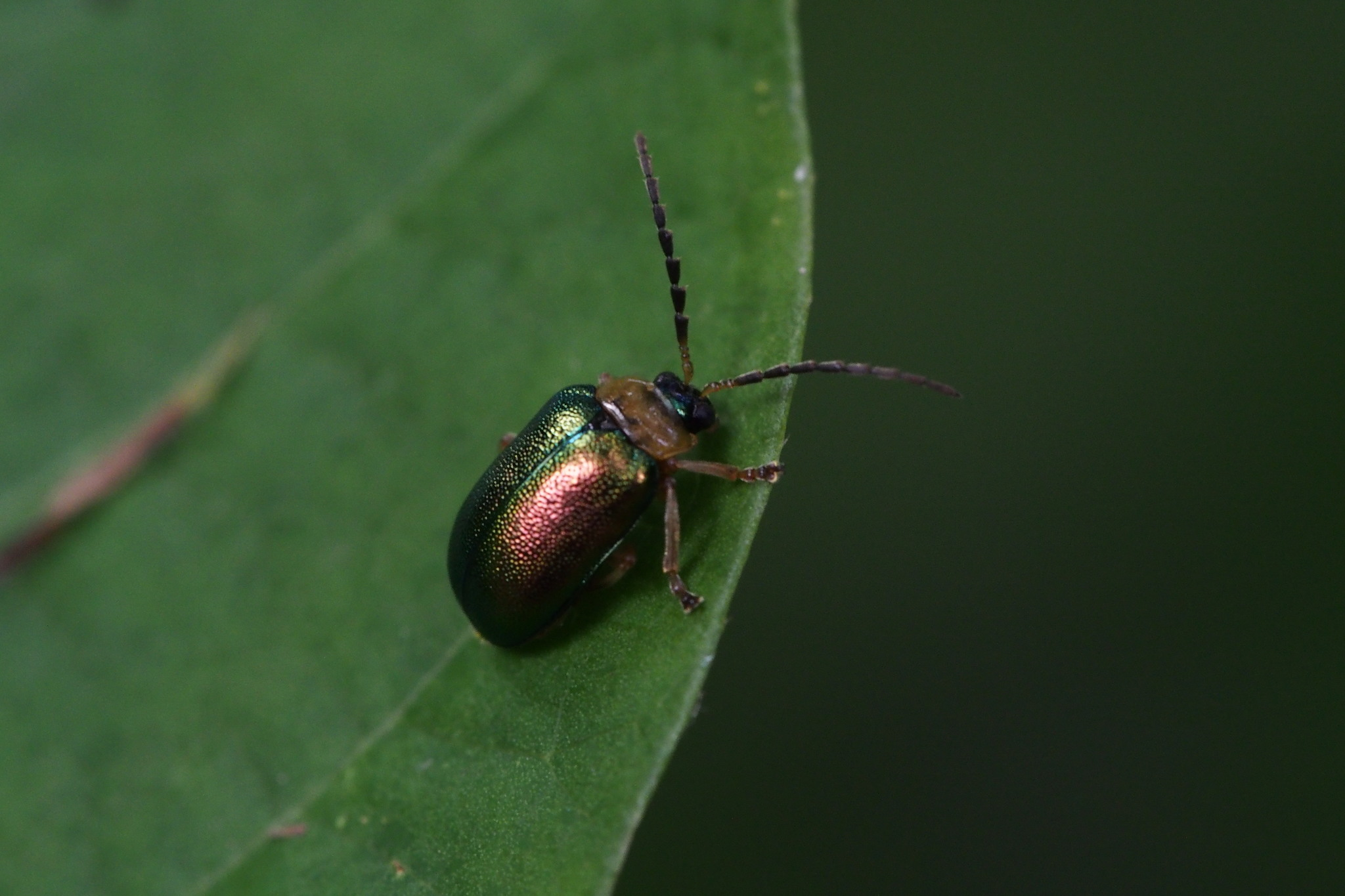
- Agelasa nigriceps, Japan

Scientific classification
- Kingdom: Animalia
- Phylum: Arthropoda
- Clade: Pancrustacea
- Class: Insecta
- Order: Coleoptera
- Suborder: Polyphaga
- Infraorder: Cucujiformia
- Family: Chrysomelidae
- Subfamily: Galerucinae
- Tribe: Hylaspini
- Genus: Agelasa; Motschulsky, 1860

= Agelasa =

Genus of leaf beetles

Agelasa is a genus of skeletonizing leaf beetles in the family Chrysomelidae. There are two described species in Agelasa, one extinct. They are found in the Palearctic.

== Species ==
These two species belong to the genus Agelasa:

- Agelasa nigriceps Motschulsky, 1860
- † Agelasa sessilis Förster, 1891
