= Leptarthra =

Scientific classification
- Kingdom: Animalia
- Phylum: Arthropoda
- Clade: Pancrustacea
- Class: Insecta
- Order: Coleoptera
- Suborder: Polyphaga
- Infraorder: Cucujiformia
- Family: Chrysomelidae
- Subfamily: Galerucinae
- Tribe: Hylaspini
- Genus: Leptarthra; Baly, 1861

Genus of leaf beetles

Leptarthra is a genus of beetles belonging to the family Chrysomelidae.

== Species ==
- Leptarthra abdominalis Baly, 1861
- Leptarthra aenea Laboissiere, 1926
- Leptarthra auriculata (Laboissiere, 1931)
- Leptarthra collaris Baly, 1878
- Leptarthra fasciata (Jacoby, 1894)
- Leptarthra gebieni (Weise, 1922)
- Leptarthra nigropicta (Fairmaire, 1889)
- Leptarthra pici Laboissiere, 1934
- Leptarthra ventralis Harold, 1880
