= Nepalogaleruca =

Scientific classification
- Kingdom: Animalia
- Phylum: Arthropoda
- Clade: Pancrustacea
- Class: Insecta
- Order: Coleoptera
- Suborder: Polyphaga
- Infraorder: Cucujiformia
- Family: Chrysomelidae
- Subfamily: Galerucinae
- Tribe: Hylaspini
- Genus: Nepalogaleruca; Kimoto, 1970

Genus of leaf beetles

Nepalogaleruca is a genus of beetles belonging to the family Chrysomelidae.

== Species ==
- Nepalogaleruca conformis Chen, 1987
- Nepalogaleruca hartmanni Medvedev, 2003
- Nepalogaleruca laeta Medvedev, 1990
- Nepalogaleruca nigriventris Chen, 1987
- Nepalogaleruca schmidti Medvedev & Sprecher-Uebersax, 1997
