= Furusawaia =

Scientific classification
- Kingdom: Animalia
- Phylum: Arthropoda
- Clade: Pancrustacea
- Class: Insecta
- Order: Coleoptera
- Suborder: Polyphaga
- Infraorder: Cucujiformia
- Family: Chrysomelidae
- Subfamily: Galerucinae
- Tribe: Hylaspini
- Genus: Furusawaia; Chûjô, 1962

Synonyms
- Yunnaniata Lopatin in Lopatin & Konstantinov, 2009

Genus of leaf beetles

Furusawaia is a genus of beetles belonging to the family Chrysomelidae.

== Species ==
- Furusawaia continentalis
- Furusawaia gaoligongensis
- Furusawaia konstantinovi
- Furusawaia jungchani
- Furusawaia lui
- Furusawaia tahsiangi
- Furusawaia tsoui
- Furusawaia yangi
- Furusawaia yosonis Chujo, 1962
