= Paraspitiella =

Scientific classification
- Kingdom: Animalia
- Phylum: Arthropoda
- Clade: Pancrustacea
- Class: Insecta
- Order: Coleoptera
- Suborder: Polyphaga
- Infraorder: Cucujiformia
- Family: Chrysomelidae
- Subfamily: Galerucinae
- Tribe: Hylaspini
- Genus: Paraspitiella; Chen & Jiang, 1981

Genus of leaf beetles

Paraspitiella is a genus of beetles belonging to the family Chrysomelidae.

== Species ==
- Paraspitiella nigrinotum
- Paraspitiella nigromaculata Chen & Jiang, 1981
