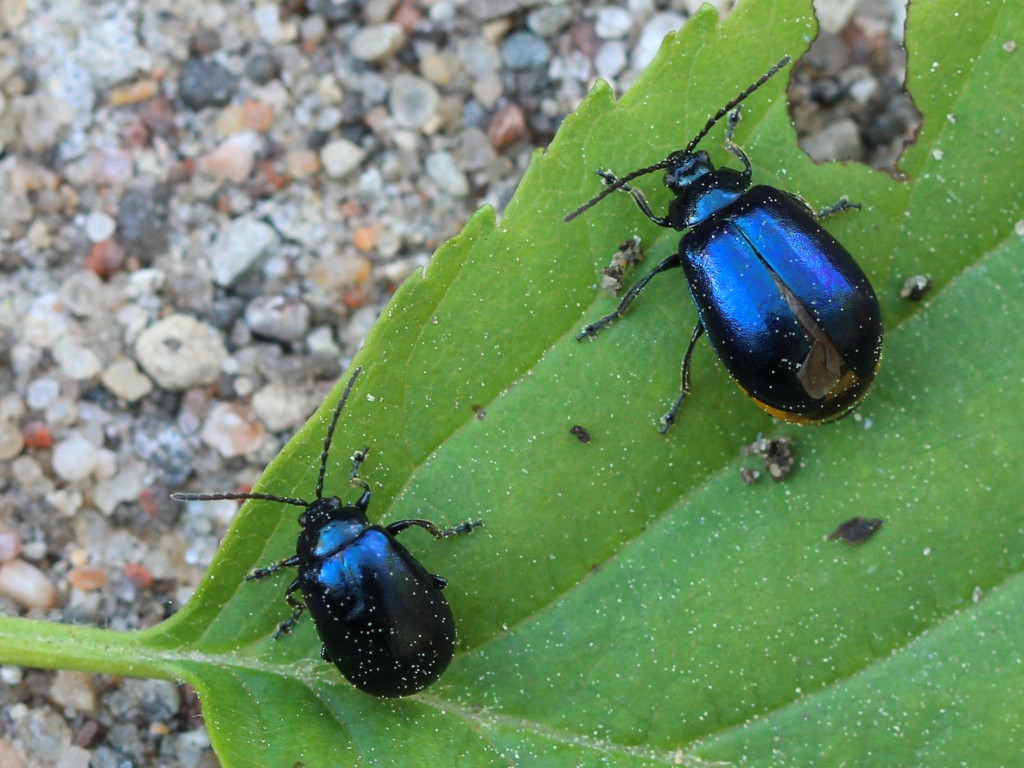
- Agelastica alni

Scientific classification
- Kingdom: Animalia
- Phylum: Arthropoda
- Clade: Pancrustacea
- Class: Insecta
- Order: Coleoptera
- Suborder: Polyphaga
- Infraorder: Cucujiformia
- Family: Chrysomelidae
- Subfamily: Galerucinae
- Tribe: Hylaspini; Latreille, 1802

Synonyms
- Hylaspites Chapuis, 1875; Hylaspina Laboissière, 1934; Sermylites Chapuis, 1875; Sermylinae Jacoby, 1884; Sermylini Leng, 1920; Antiphites Chapuis, 1875; Agelasticites Chapuis, 1875; Agelasticini Leng, 1920; Agelasini Leng, 1920; Bonesiites Laboissière, 1926; Capulini Ogloblin, 1936; Gallerucidini Gressitt & Kimoto, 1963; Sermylassini Mroczkowski, 1991

= Hylaspini =

Tribe of beetles

Hylaspini is a tribe of beetles in the family Chrysomelidae.

== Genera ==
These genera belong to the tribe Hylaspini:

- Section Agelasticites:
  - Agelastica
  - Borneola
  - Miltina
  - Morphosphaera
- Section Antiphites:
  - Amandus
  - Anthiphula
  - Arthrotidea
  - Arthrotus
  - Cyclantipha
  - Dercetina
  - Dercetisoma
  - Emathea
  - Munina
  - Proegmena
  - Pseudeustetha
  - Sermyloides
  - Shamshera
  - Taphina
- Section Bonesiites:
  - Aulamorphoides
  - Aulamorphus
  - Bonesia
  - Morphosphaeroides
- Section Capulites:
  - Capula
  - Furusawaia
  - Himaplosonyx
  - Nepalogaleruca
- Section Hylaspites:
  - Agelasa
  - Doryida
  - Doryidella
  - Doryidomorpha
  - Gallerucida
  - Haemodoryida
  - Hamushia
  - Hylaspoides
  - Laphris
  - Leptarthra
  - Meristata
  - Meristoides
  - Paraspitiella
  - Parastetha
  - Sphenoraia
  - Spitiella
  - Yunaspes
- Section Sermylassites:
  - Aplosonyx
  - Astridella
  - Pseudaplosonyx
  - Sermylassa
- Not assigned to a section/unknown:
  - Leptarthroides
  - Sphenorella
