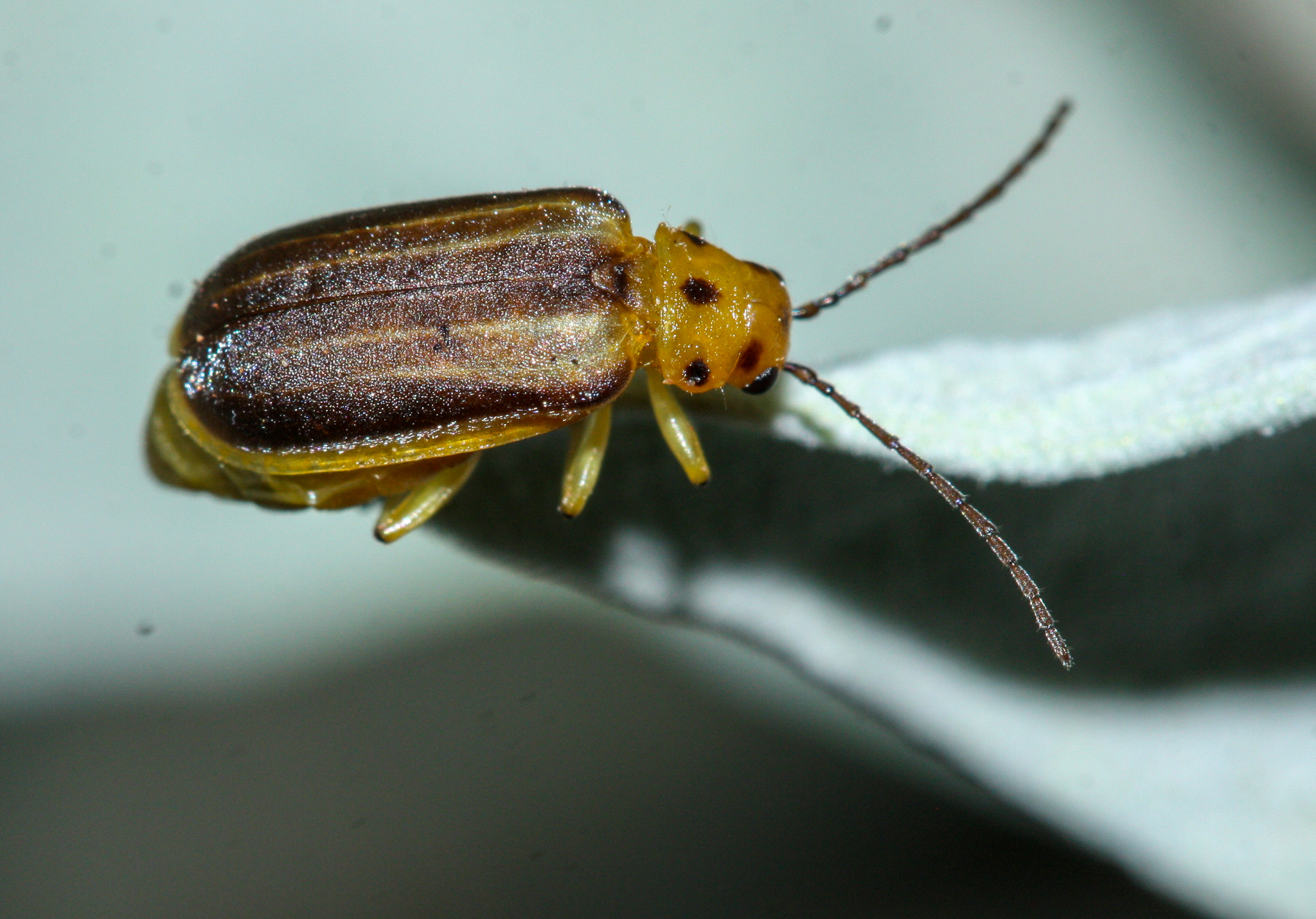

Scientific classification
- Kingdom: Animalia
- Phylum: Arthropoda
- Clade: Pancrustacea
- Class: Insecta
- Order: Coleoptera
- Suborder: Polyphaga
- Infraorder: Cucujiformia
- Family: Chrysomelidae
- Genus: Trirhabda
- Species: T. geminata

Binomial name
- Trirhabda geminata Horn, 1893

= Trirhabda geminata =

Species of beetle

Trirhabda geminata, also known as the encelia leaf beetle, is a species of skeletonizing leaf beetle in the family Chrysomelidae. It is found in Central America and North America.
