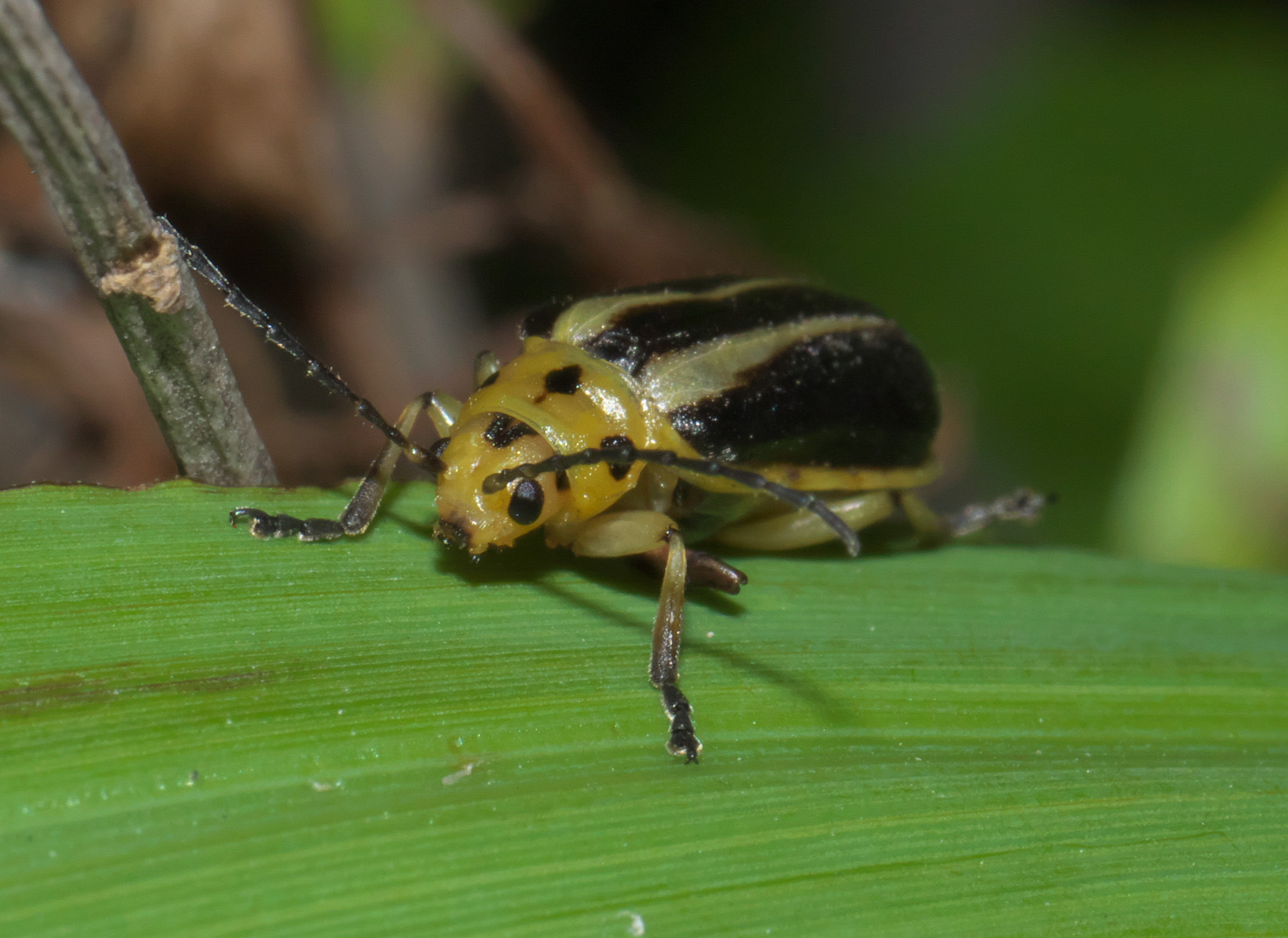

Scientific classification
- Kingdom: Animalia
- Phylum: Arthropoda
- Clade: Pancrustacea
- Class: Insecta
- Order: Coleoptera
- Suborder: Polyphaga
- Infraorder: Cucujiformia
- Family: Chrysomelidae
- Genus: Trirhabda
- Species: T. bacharidis

Binomial name
- Trirhabda bacharidis (Weber, 1801)

= Trirhabda bacharidis =

Species of beetle

Trirhabda bacharidis, known generally as the groundselbush beetle or groundsel bush leaf beetle, is a species of skeletonizing leaf beetle in the family Chrysomelidae. It is found in Australia, North America, and Southern Asia.

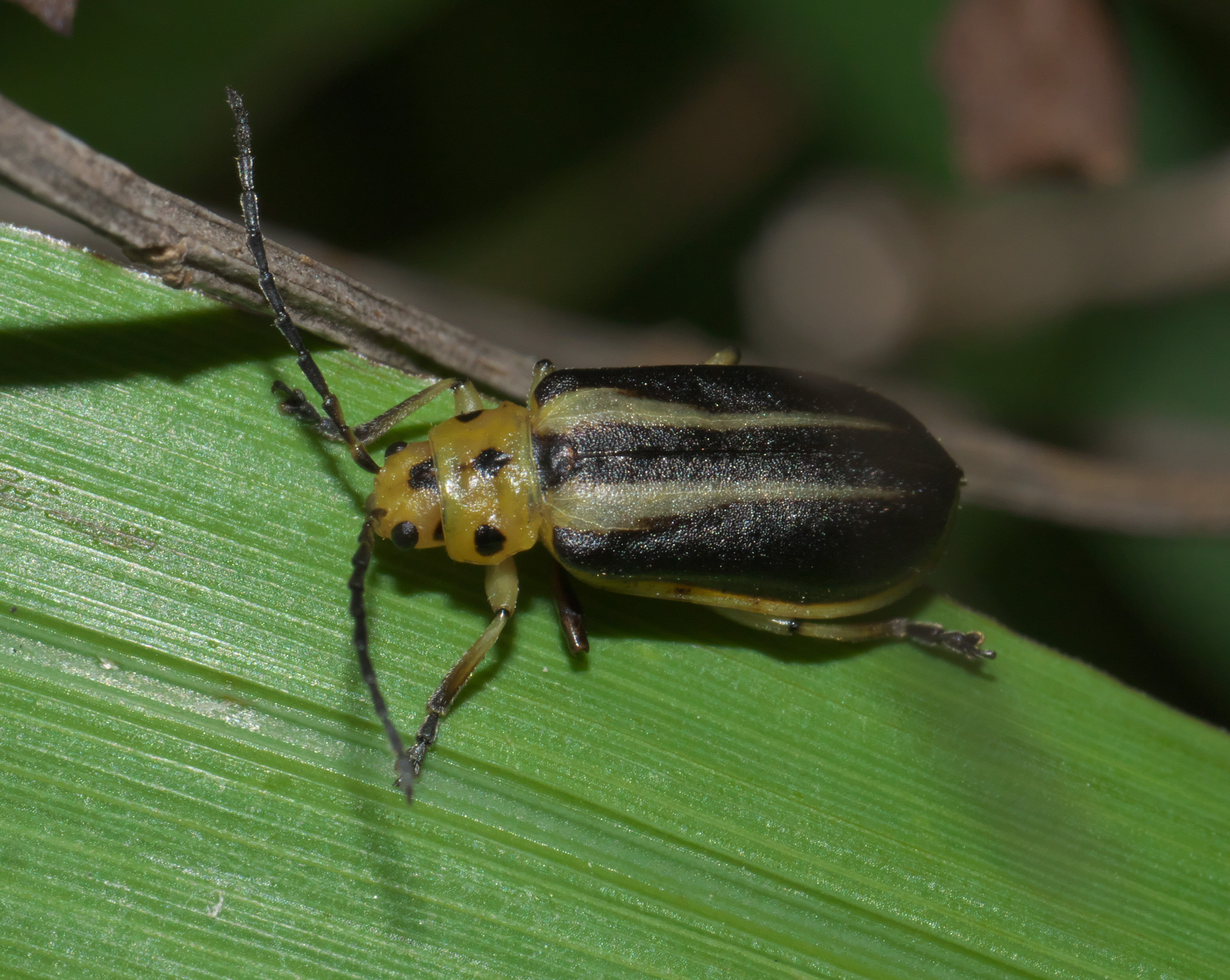
Groundselbush beetle, Trirhabda bacharidis
