= Trirhabda schwarzi =

Scientific classification
- Kingdom: Animalia
- Phylum: Arthropoda
- Clade: Pancrustacea
- Class: Insecta
- Order: Coleoptera
- Suborder: Polyphaga
- Infraorder: Cucujiformia
- Family: Chrysomelidae
- Genus: Trirhabda
- Species: T. schwarzi

Binomial name
- Trirhabda schwarzi Blake, 1951

Species of beetle

Trirhabda schwarzi is a species of skeletonizing leaf beetle in the family Chrysomelidae. It is found in North America.
