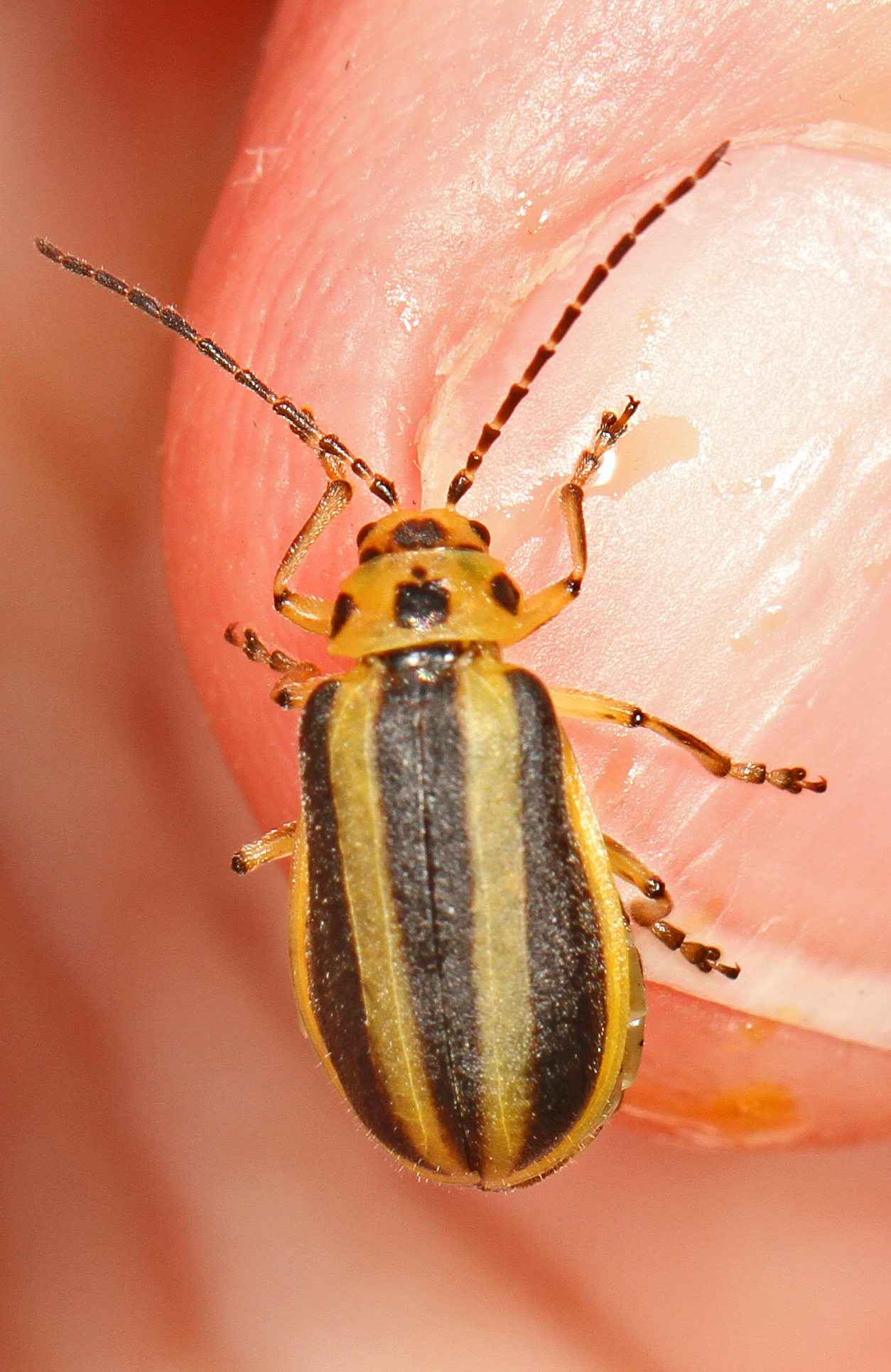

Scientific classification
- Kingdom: Animalia
- Phylum: Arthropoda
- Clade: Pancrustacea
- Class: Insecta
- Order: Coleoptera
- Suborder: Polyphaga
- Infraorder: Cucujiformia
- Family: Chrysomelidae
- Genus: Trirhabda
- Species: T. borealis

Binomial name
- Trirhabda borealis Blake, 1931

= Trirhabda borealis =

Species of beetle

Trirhabda borealis is a species of skeletonizing leaf beetle in the family Chrysomelidae. It is found in North America.

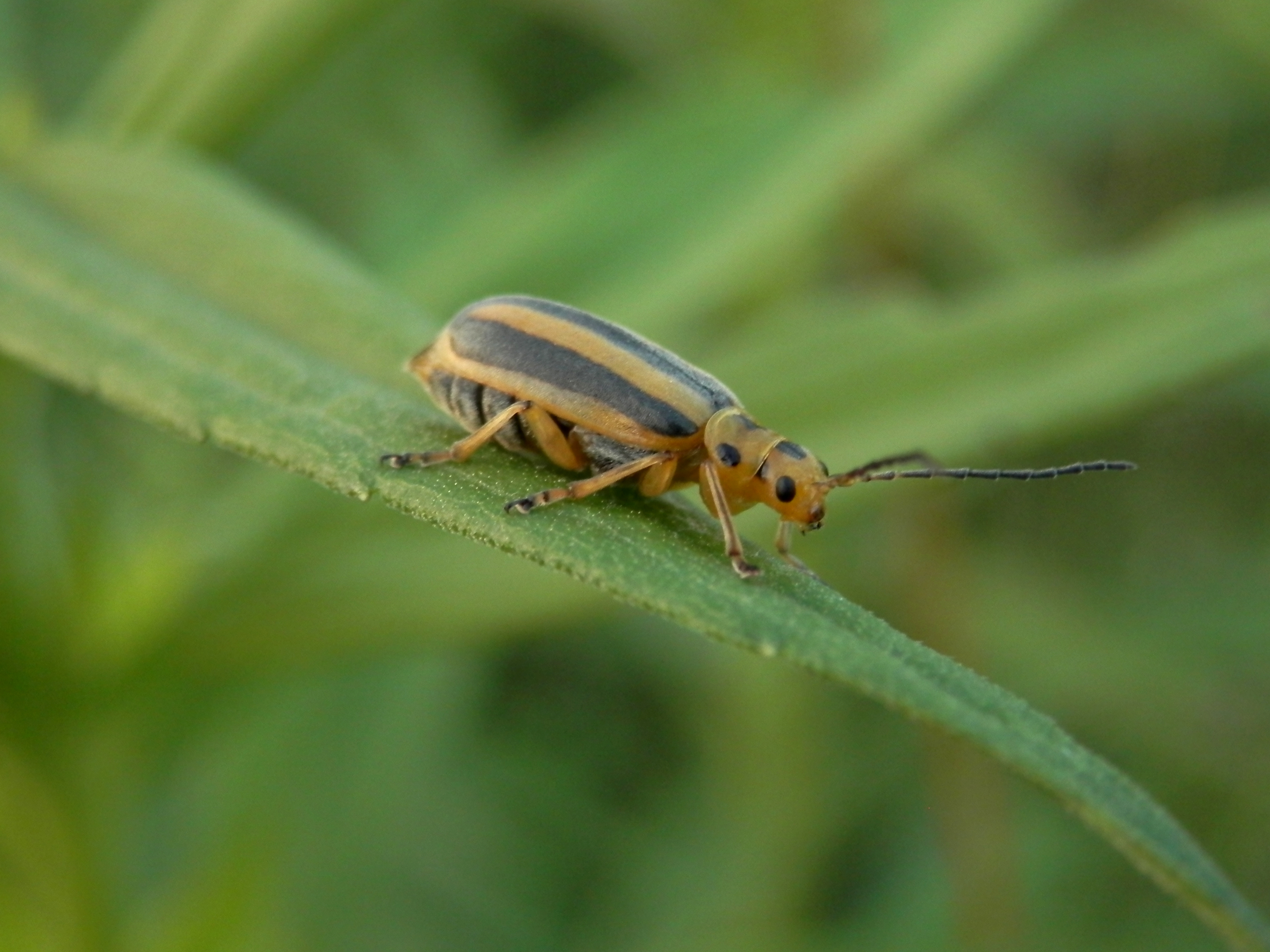

== Subspecies ==
These two subspecies belong to the species Trirhabda borealis:

- Trirhabda borealis borealis
- Trirhabda borealis indigoptera Blake
