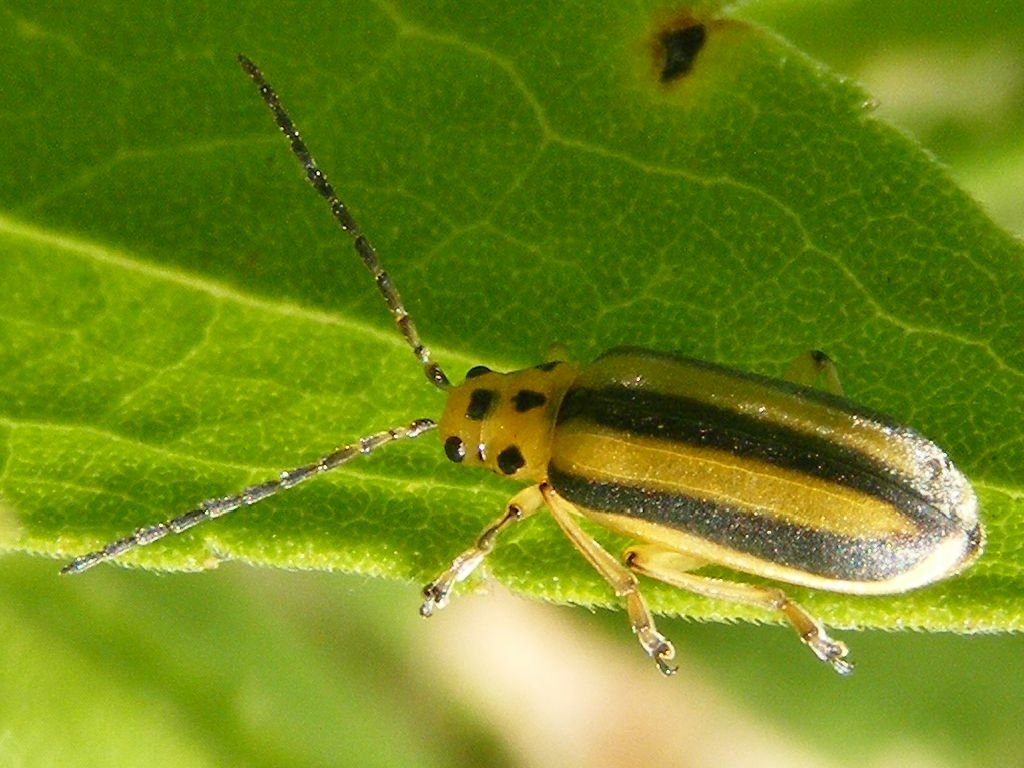

Scientific classification
- Kingdom: Animalia
- Phylum: Arthropoda
- Clade: Pancrustacea
- Class: Insecta
- Order: Coleoptera
- Suborder: Polyphaga
- Infraorder: Cucujiformia
- Family: Chrysomelidae
- Genus: Trirhabda
- Species: T. canadensis

Binomial name
- Trirhabda canadensis (Kirby, 1837)

= Trirhabda canadensis =

Species of beetle

Trirhabda canadensis, the goldenrod leaf beetle, is a species of leaf beetle in the family Chrysomelidae. It is found in North America.

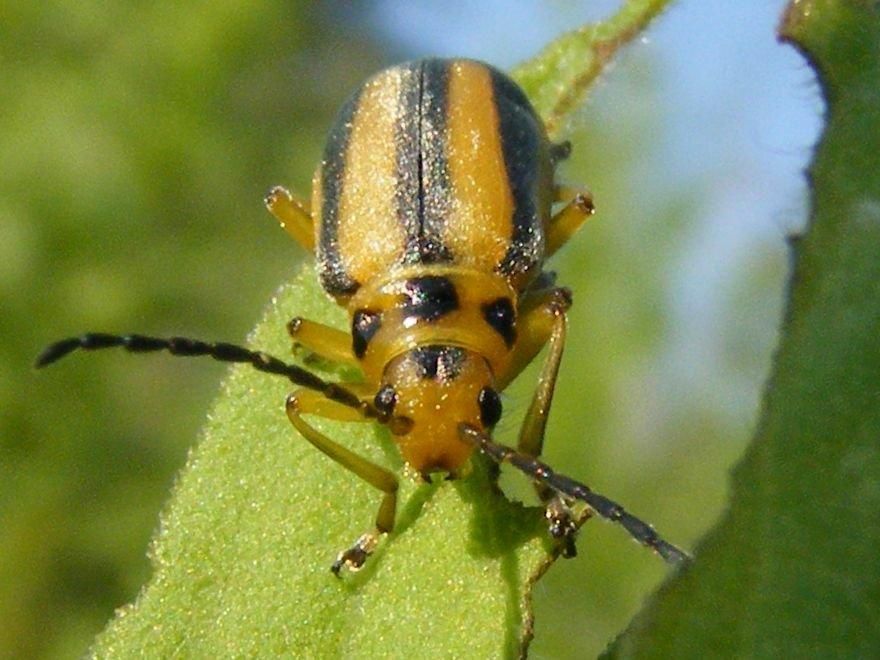
Goldenrod leaf beetle, Trirhabda canadensis

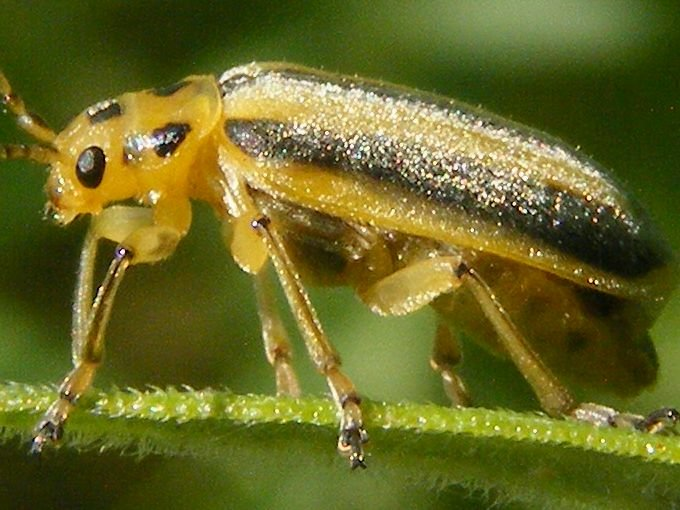
Goldenrod leaf beetle, Trirhabda canadensis

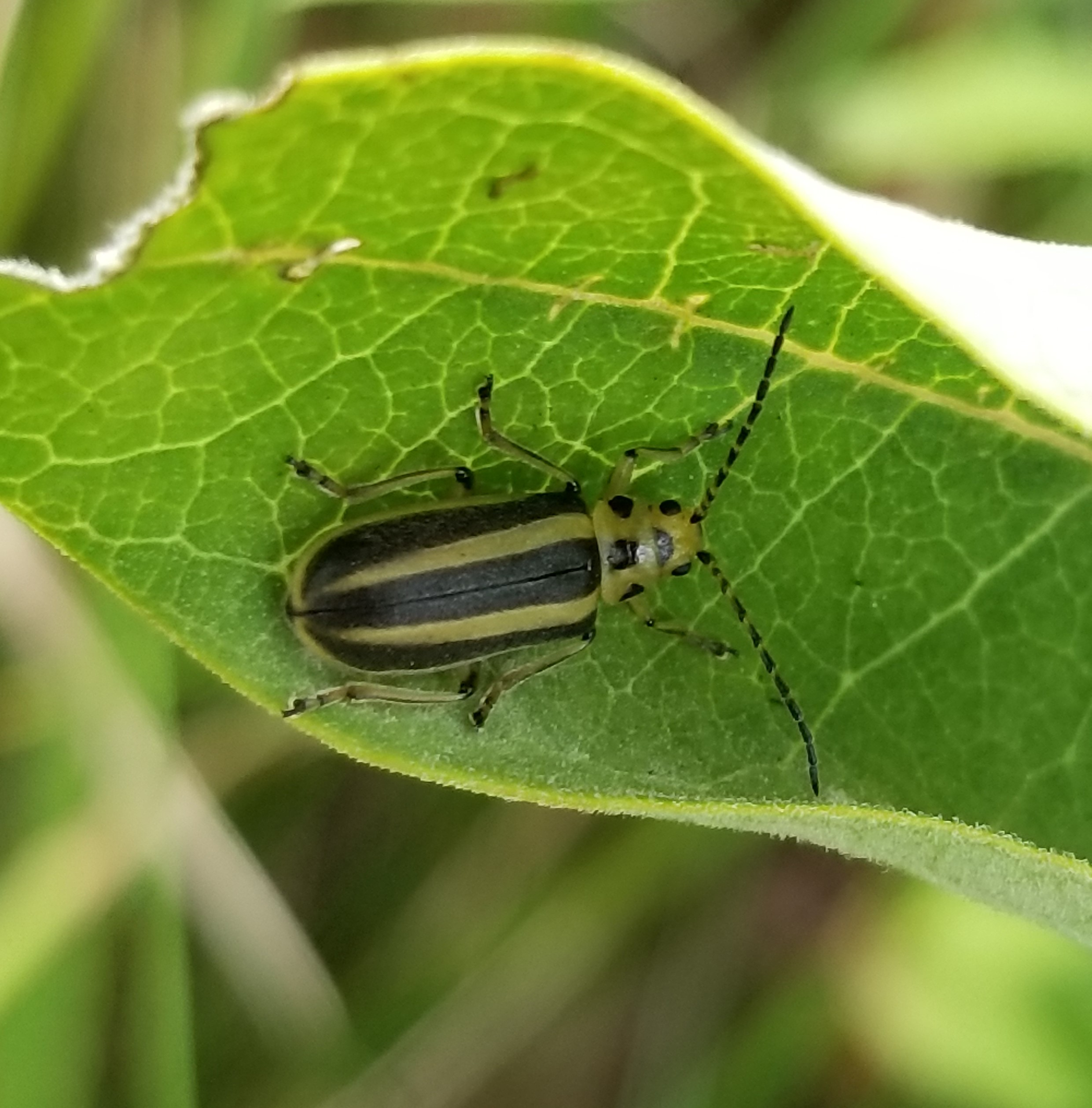
Goldenrod Leaf Beetle in Toronto, Canada
