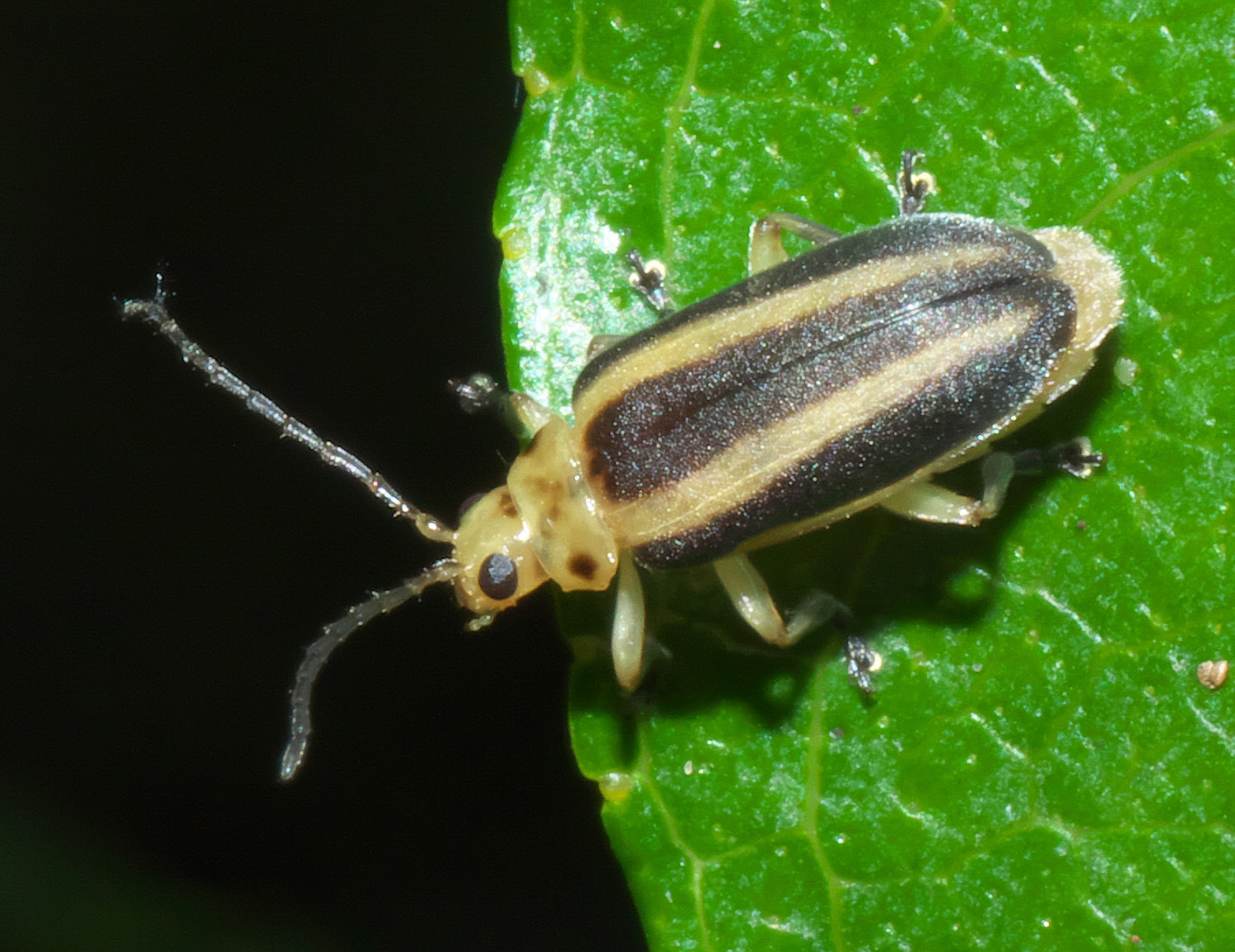
- Trirhabda canadensis

Scientific classification
- Kingdom: Animalia
- Phylum: Arthropoda
- Clade: Pancrustacea
- Class: Insecta
- Order: Coleoptera
- Suborder: Polyphaga
- Infraorder: Cucujiformia
- Family: Chrysomelidae
- Tribe: Galerucini
- Genus: Trirhabda; J. L. LeConte, 1865

= Trirhabda =

Genus of beetles

Trirhabda is a genus of skeletonizing leaf beetles in the family Chrysomelidae. There are more than 30 described species in Trirhabda. They are found in North America and Mexico.

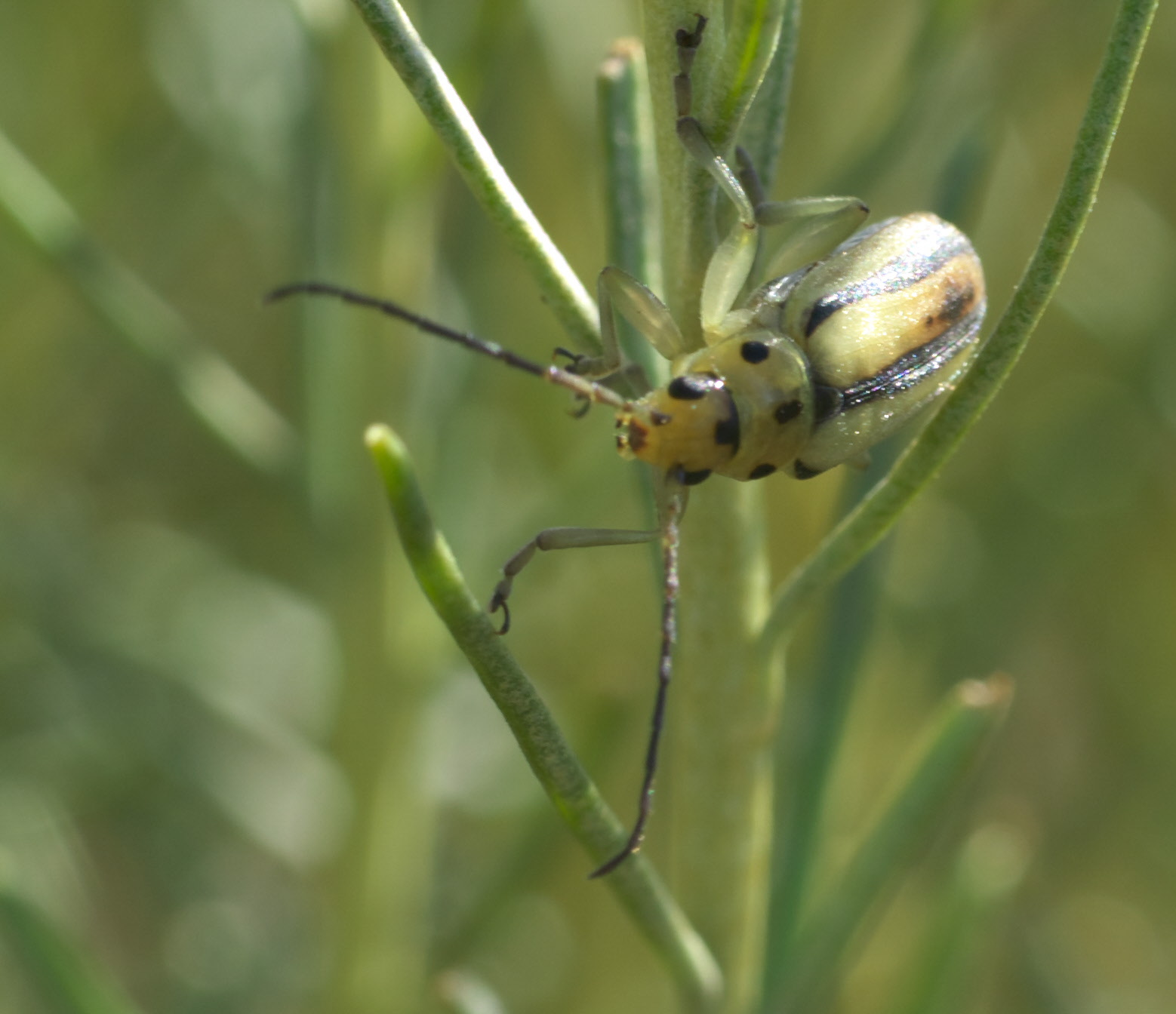

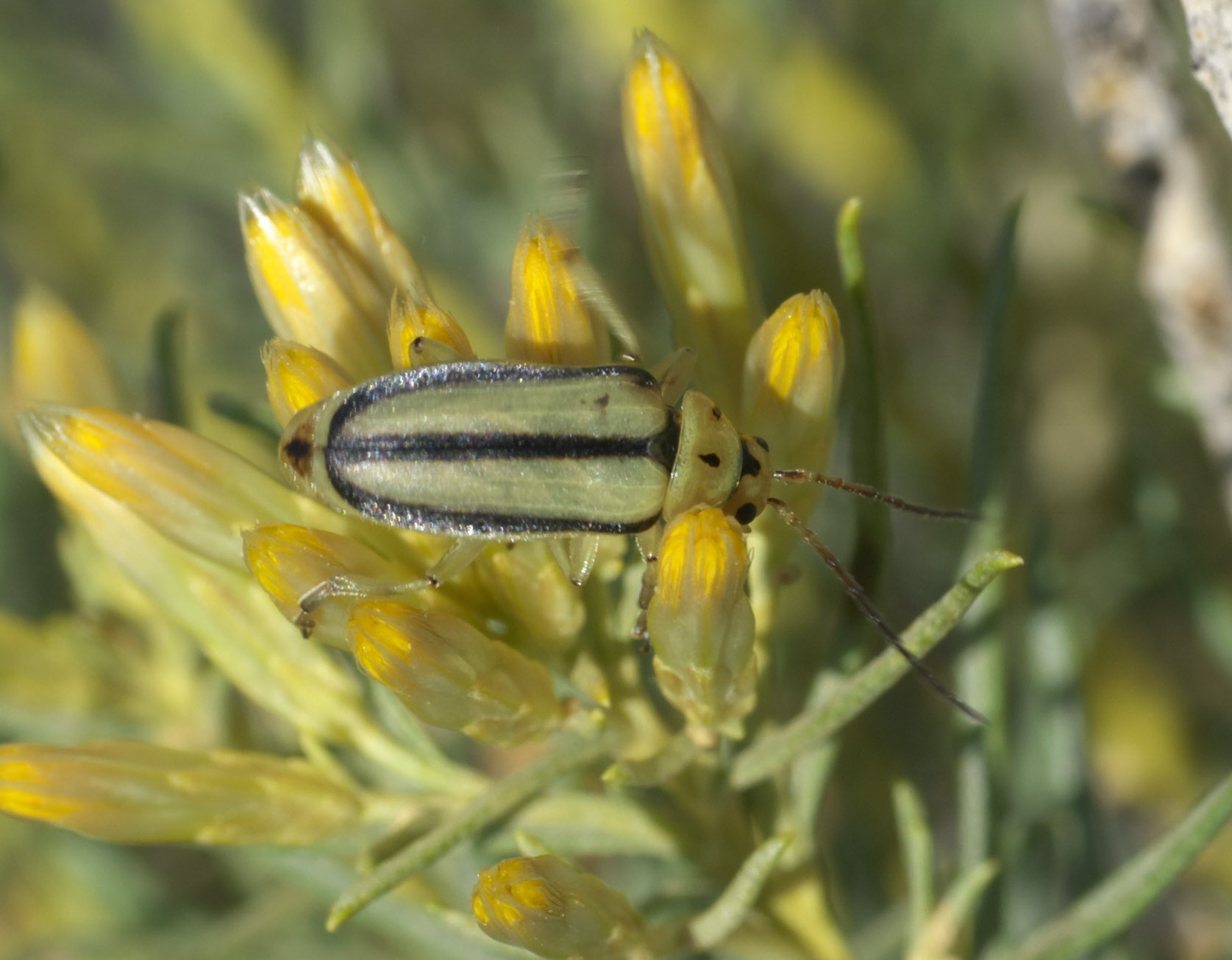

== Species ==
These 33 species belong to the genus Trirhabda:

- Trirhabda adela Blake, 1931
- Trirhabda aenea Jacoby, 1886
- Trirhabda attenuata (Say, 1824)
- Trirhabda bacharidis (Weber, 1801) (groundselbush beetle)
- Trirhabda borealis Blake, 1931
- Trirhabda caduca Horn, 1893
- Trirhabda canadensis (Kirby, 1837) (goldenrod leaf beetle)
- Trirhabda confusa Blake, 1931
- Trirhabda convergens J. L. LeConte, 1865
- Trirhabda diducta Horn, 1893
- Trirhabda eriodictyonis Fall, 1907
- Trirhabda flavolimbata (Mannerheim, 1843)
- Trirhabda geminata Horn, 1893
- Trirhabda gurneyi Blake
- Trirhabda labrata Fall, 1907
- Trirhabda lewisii Crotch, 1873
- Trirhabda luteocincta (J. L. LeConte, 1858)
- Trirhabda majuscula Wickham, 1914
- Trirhabda manisi Hogue in Hatch, 1971
- Trirhabda megacephala Wickham, 1914
- Trirhabda nigriventris Blake, 1951
- Trirhabda nigrohumeralis Schaeffer
- Trirhabda nitidicollis J. L. LeConte, 1865
- Trirhabda pilosa Blake, 1931
- Trirhabda pubicollis Blake, 1951
- Trirhabda rugosa Jacoby, 1892
- Trirhabda schwarzi Blake, 1951
- Trirhabda sepulta Wickham, 1914
- Trirhabda sericotrachyla Blake, 1931
- Trirhabda sublaevicollis Jacoby, 1892
- Trirhabda variabilis Jacoby, 1886
- Trirhabda virgata J. L. LeConte, 1865
- Trirhabda viridicyanea Blake
