= Trirhabda pilosa =

Scientific classification
- Kingdom: Animalia
- Phylum: Arthropoda
- Clade: Pancrustacea
- Class: Insecta
- Order: Coleoptera
- Suborder: Polyphaga
- Infraorder: Cucujiformia
- Family: Chrysomelidae
- Genus: Trirhabda
- Species: T. pilosa

Binomial name
- Trirhabda pilosa Blake, 1931

Species of beetle

Trirhabda pilosa is a species of skeletonizing leaf beetle in the family Chrysomelidae. It is found in North America.

== Subspecies ==
These two subspecies belong to the species Trirhabda pilosa:

- Trirhabda pilosa pilosa Blake, 1931
- Trirhabda pilosa vittata Hogue in Hatch, 1971
