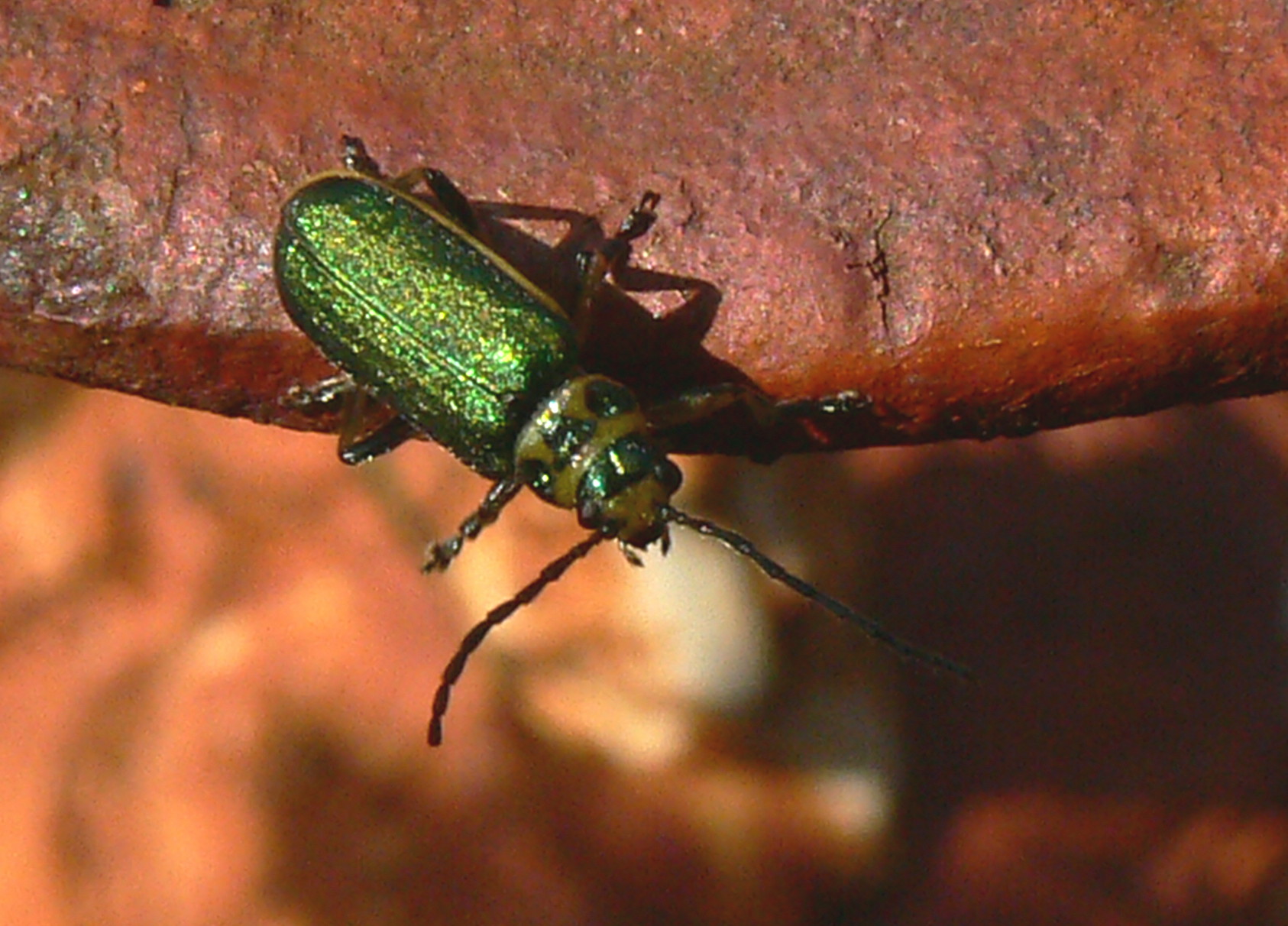

Scientific classification
- Kingdom: Animalia
- Phylum: Arthropoda
- Clade: Pancrustacea
- Class: Insecta
- Order: Coleoptera
- Suborder: Polyphaga
- Infraorder: Cucujiformia
- Family: Chrysomelidae
- Genus: Trirhabda
- Species: T. flavolimbata

Binomial name
- Trirhabda flavolimbata (Mannerheim, 1843)

= Trirhabda flavolimbata =

Species of beetle

Trirhabda flavolimbata, also called the coyote brush leaf beetle, is a species of skeletonizing leaf beetle in the family Chrysomelidae. It is found in California in coastal scrublands or chaparral habitats. Its main host plant is coyote brush, but it has been noted to feed on other species of Baccharis, as well as Aster, Senecio, Artemisia, Solidago, and Eriodictyon.

Larvae and adult coyote brush leaf beetles are metallic green. This coloration might function as a warning color, as both larvae and adult beetles are toxic due to chemicals ingested from the coyote brush.

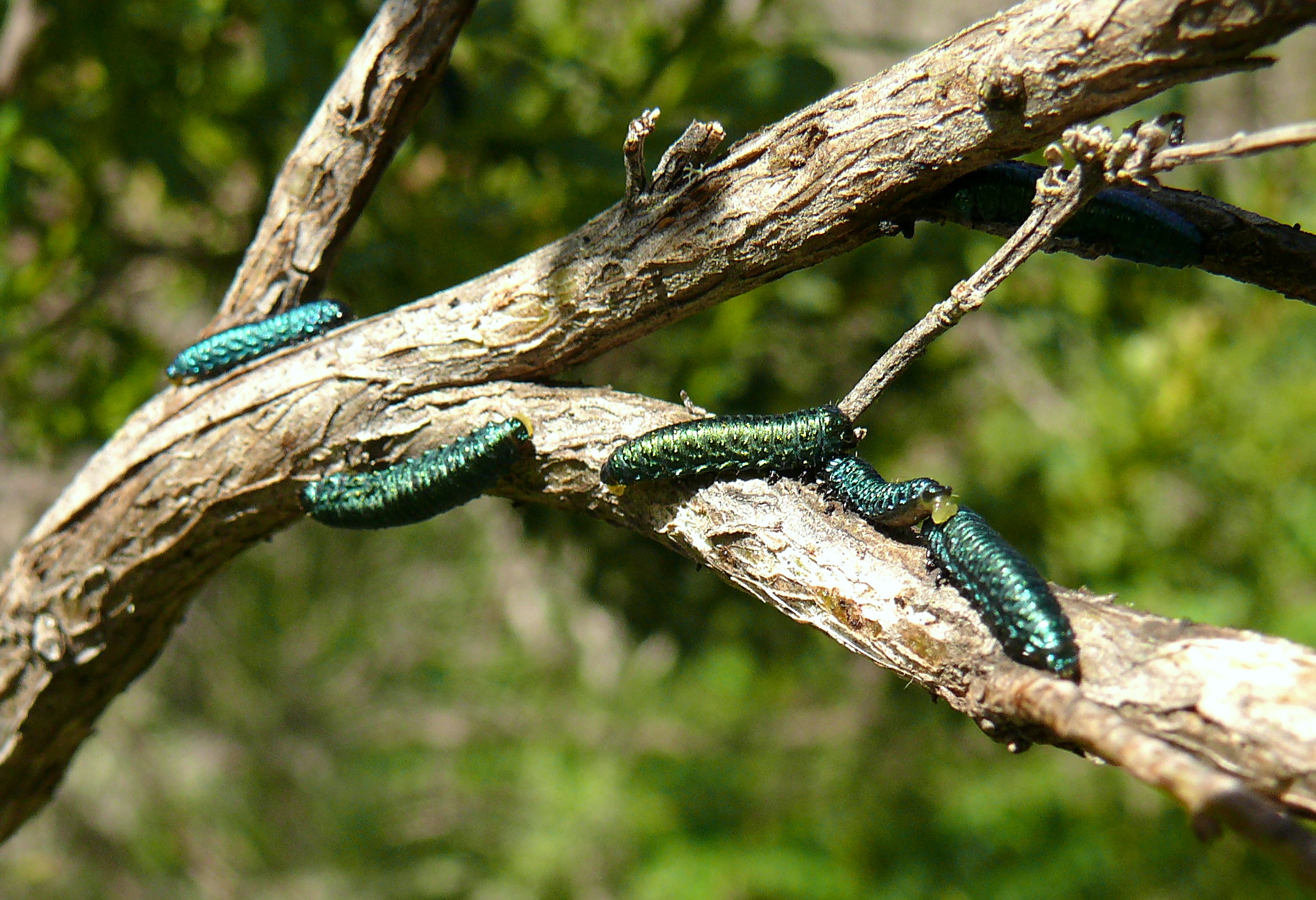
Coyote brush leaf beetle larvae

Coyote brush leaf beetles have one brood a season. They lay their eggs in soil, where they remain over summer and winter before hatching. Larvae feed voraciously on the coyote brush, then return to the soil to pupate for about two weeks. Larvae are generally active February to March, with adults active April to May.
