= Trirhabda attenuata =

Scientific classification
- Kingdom: Animalia
- Phylum: Arthropoda
- Clade: Pancrustacea
- Class: Insecta
- Order: Coleoptera
- Suborder: Polyphaga
- Infraorder: Cucujiformia
- Family: Chrysomelidae
- Genus: Trirhabda
- Species: T. attenuata

Binomial name
- Trirhabda attenuata (Say, 1824)

Species of beetle

Trirhabda attenuata is a species of skeletonizing leaf beetle in the family Chrysomelidae, found in North America.
