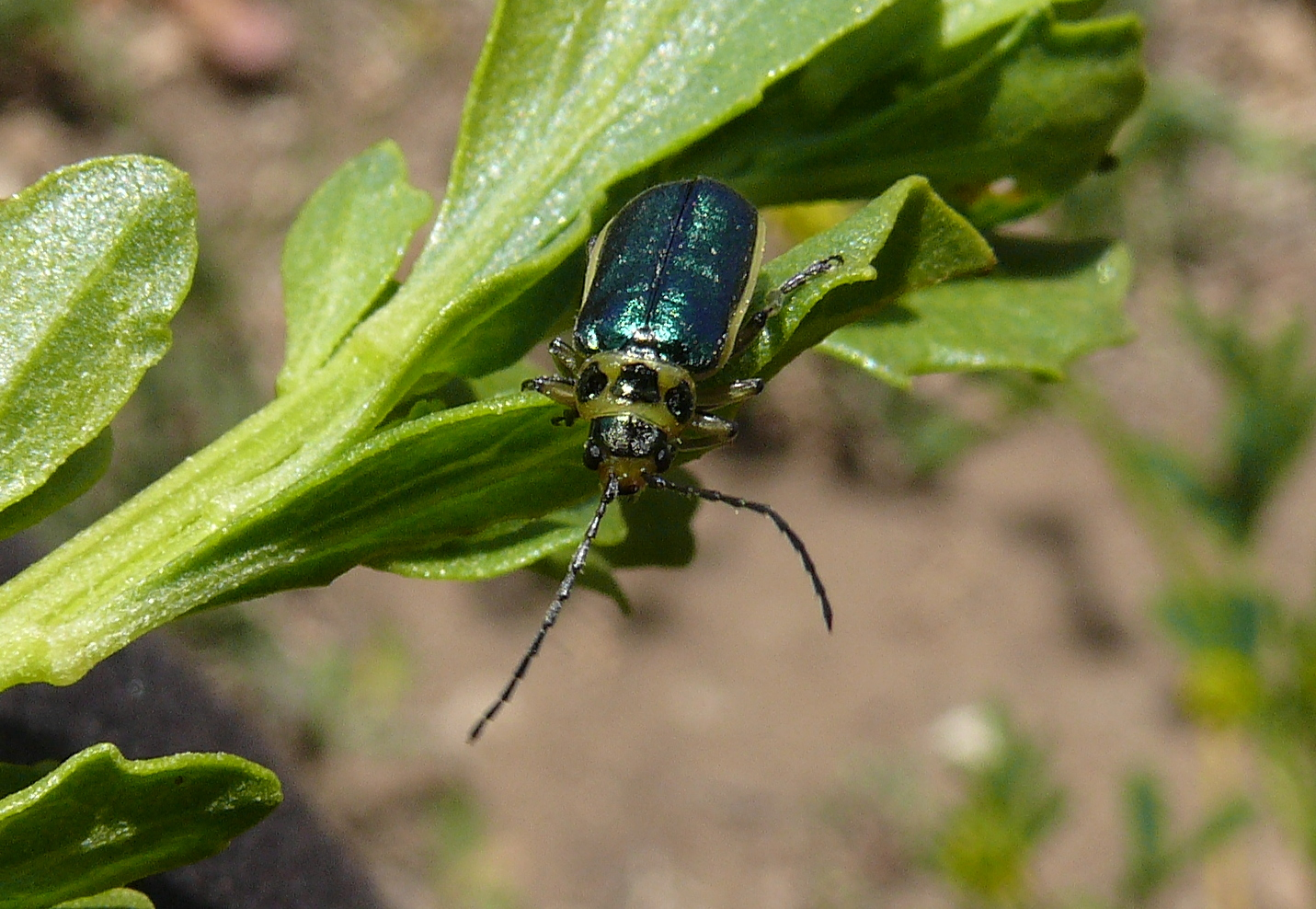
- Coyote bush beetle (Trirhabda luteocincta)

Scientific classification
- Kingdom: Animalia
- Phylum: Arthropoda
- Clade: Pancrustacea
- Class: Insecta
- Order: Coleoptera
- Suborder: Polyphaga
- Infraorder: Cucujiformia
- Family: Chrysomelidae
- Genus: Trirhabda
- Species: T. luteocincta

Binomial name
- Trirhabda luteocincta (J. L. LeConte, 1858)

= Trirhabda luteocincta =

Species of beetle

Trirhabda luteocincta is a species of skeletonizing leaf beetle in the family Chrysomelidae. It is found in North America.
