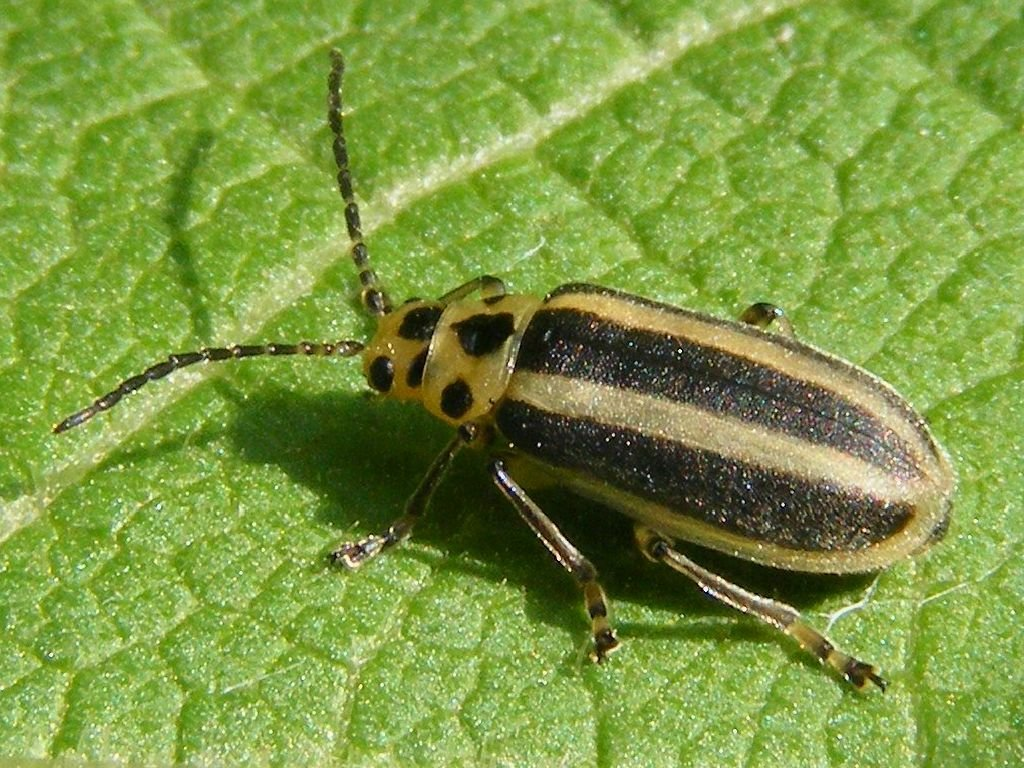

Scientific classification
- Kingdom: Animalia
- Phylum: Arthropoda
- Clade: Pancrustacea
- Class: Insecta
- Order: Coleoptera
- Suborder: Polyphaga
- Infraorder: Cucujiformia
- Family: Chrysomelidae
- Genus: Trirhabda
- Species: T. virgata

Binomial name
- Trirhabda virgata J. L. LeConte, 1865

= Trirhabda virgata =

Species of beetle

Trirhabda virgata is a species of leaf beetle in the family Chrysomelidae. It is found in North America.

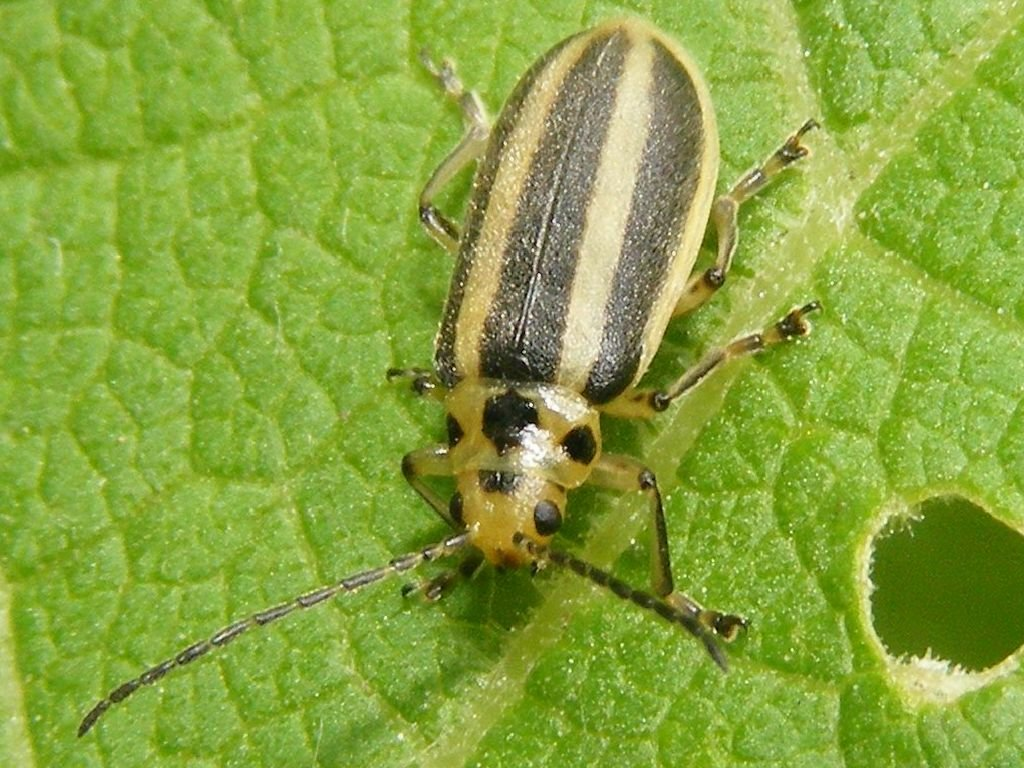

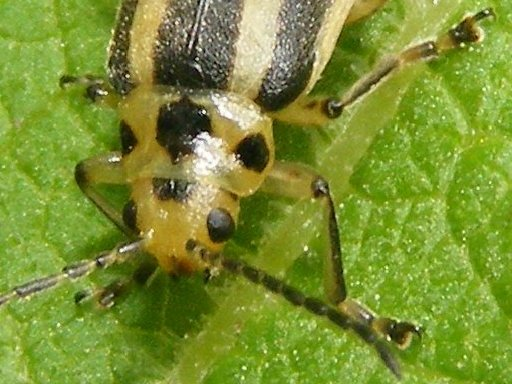
