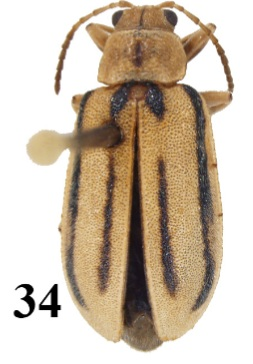

Scientific classification
- Kingdom: Animalia
- Phylum: Arthropoda
- Clade: Pancrustacea
- Class: Insecta
- Order: Coleoptera
- Suborder: Polyphaga
- Infraorder: Cucujiformia
- Family: Chrysomelidae
- Genus: Erynephala
- Species: E. maritima

Binomial name
- Erynephala maritima (J. L. LeConte, 1865)

Synonyms
- Galeruca maritima LeConte, 1865; Erynephala brighti Blake, 1970

= Erynephala maritima =

Species of beetle

Erynephala maritima is a species of skeletonizing leaf beetle from the family Chrysomelidae. It is found in the Caribbean Sea, Central America, and North America, where it has been recorded from Nova Scotia, Texas, Mexico and Jamaica.
