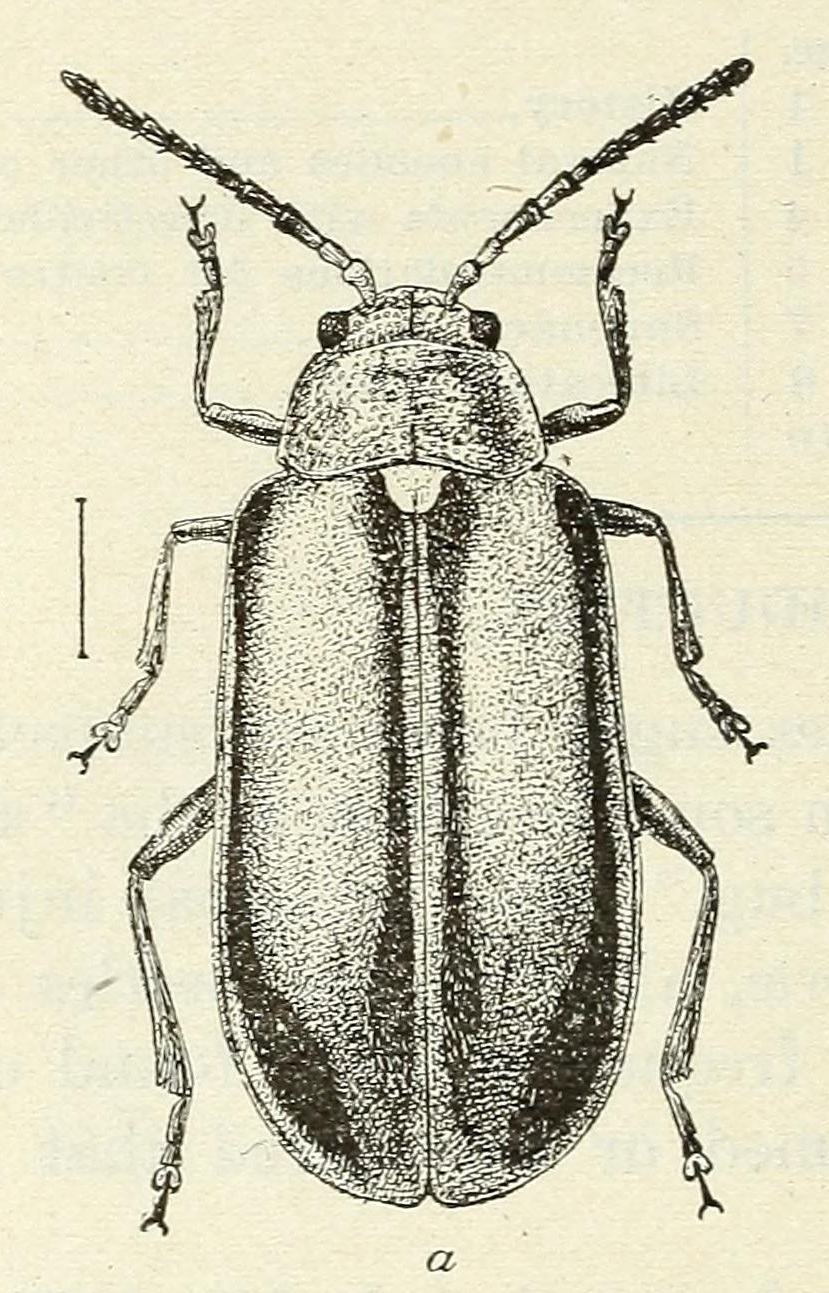
- Erynephala puncticollis

Scientific classification
- Kingdom: Animalia
- Phylum: Arthropoda
- Clade: Pancrustacea
- Class: Insecta
- Order: Coleoptera
- Suborder: Polyphaga
- Infraorder: Cucujiformia
- Family: Chrysomelidae
- Tribe: Galerucini
- Genus: Erynephala; Blake, 1936

Type species
- Galeruca maritima J. L. LeConte, 1865

Synonyms
- Sarigueia Bechyné, 1956

= Erynephala =

Genus of beetles

Erynephala is a genus of skeletonizing leaf beetles in the family Chrysomelidae. There are six described species in Erynephala. They are found in North America and the Neotropics.

== Species ==
These species belonging to genus Erynephala are:

- Erynephala glabra Blake, 1936
- Erynephala interrupta (Jacoby, 1904)
- Erynephala maritima (J. L. LeConte, 1865) (= E.brighti)
- Erynephala morosa (J. L. LeConte, 1857)
- Erynephala puncticollis (Say, 1824) (beet leaf beetle)
- Erynephala subvittata (De Mey, 1838)
- Erynephala texana (Schaeffer, 1932)
