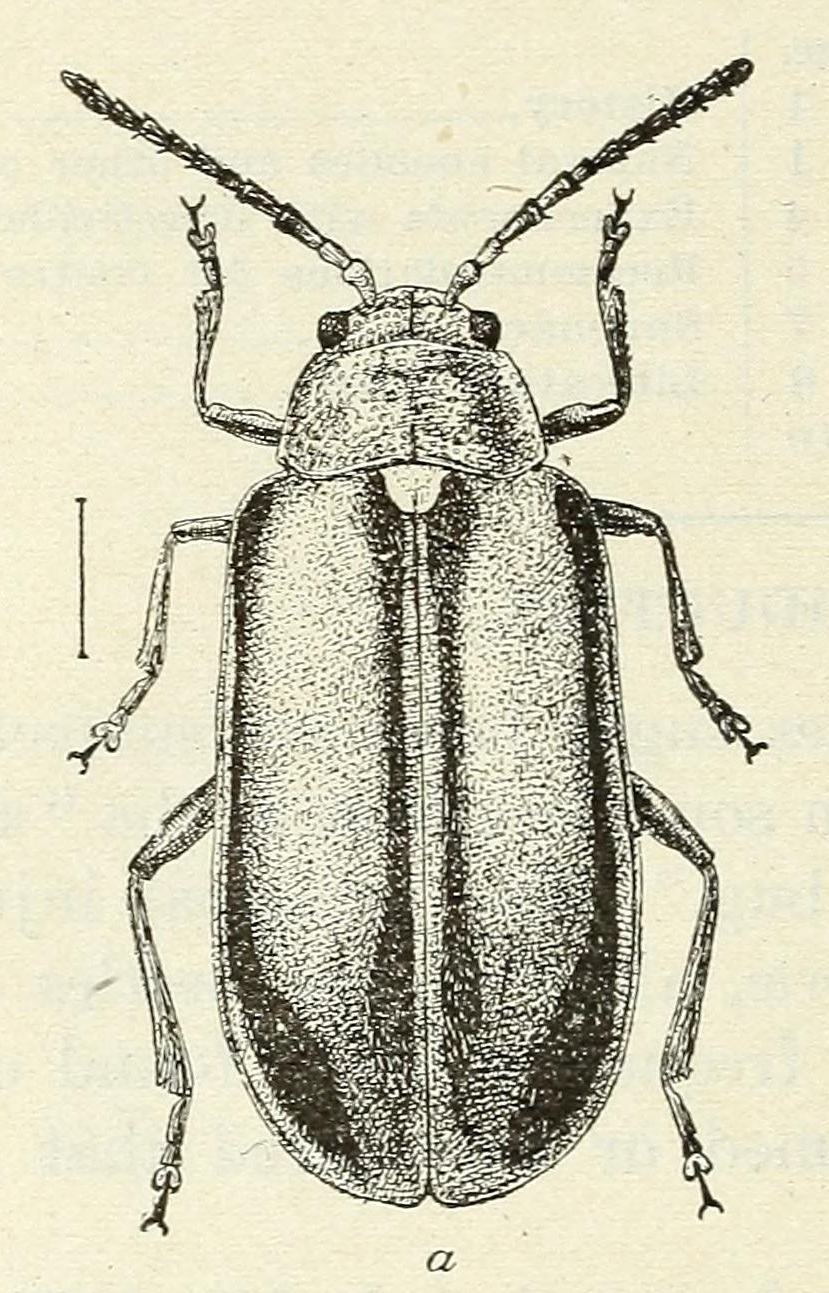

Scientific classification
- Kingdom: Animalia
- Phylum: Arthropoda
- Clade: Pancrustacea
- Class: Insecta
- Order: Coleoptera
- Suborder: Polyphaga
- Infraorder: Cucujiformia
- Family: Chrysomelidae
- Genus: Erynephala
- Species: E. puncticollis

Binomial name
- Erynephala puncticollis (Say, 1824)

= Erynephala puncticollis =

Species of beetle

Erynephala puncticollis, the beet leaf beetle, is a species of skeletonizing leaf beetle in the family Chrysomelidae. It is found in Central America and North America.
