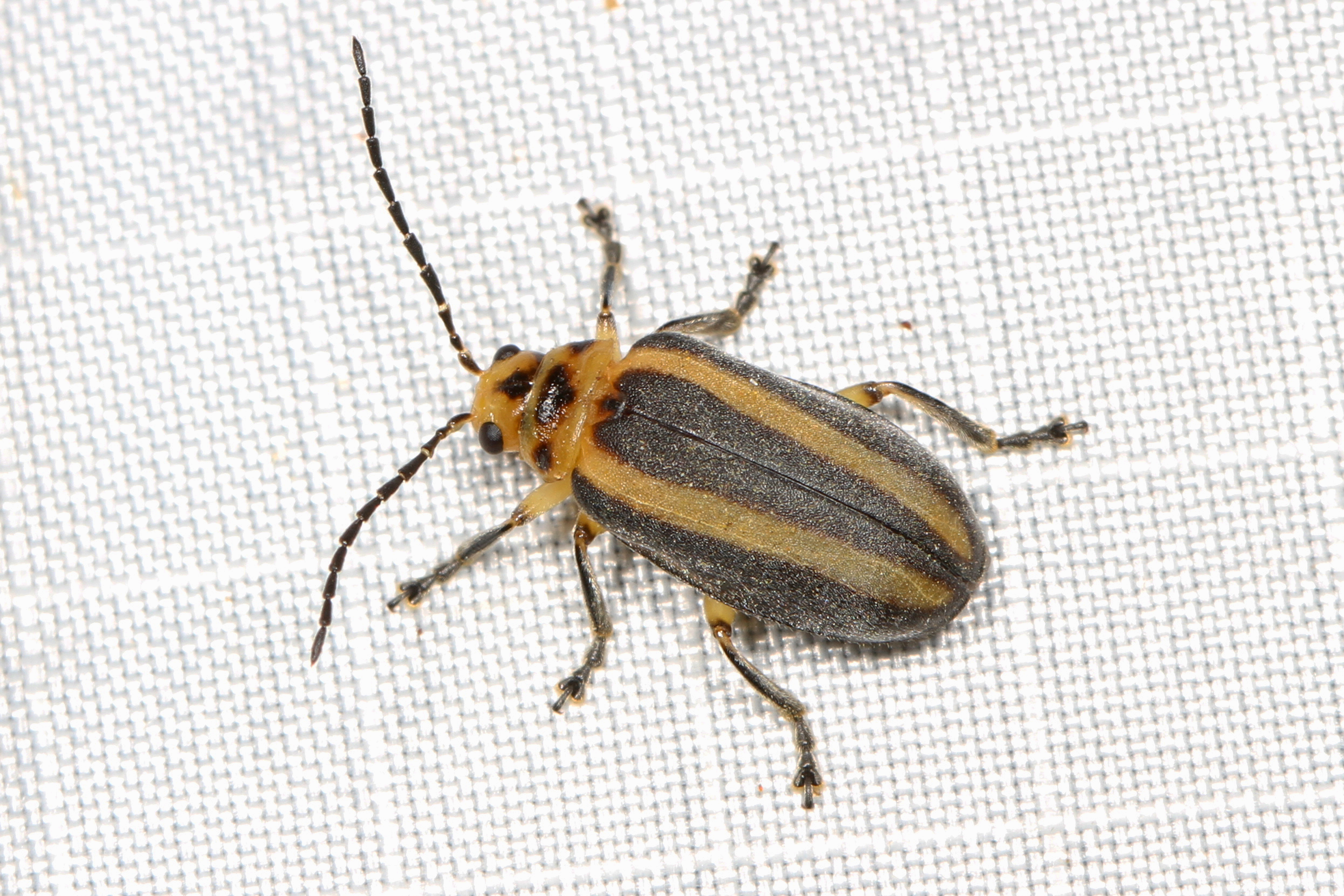
- Derospidea brevicollis

Scientific classification
- Kingdom: Animalia
- Phylum: Arthropoda
- Clade: Pancrustacea
- Class: Insecta
- Order: Coleoptera
- Suborder: Polyphaga
- Infraorder: Cucujiformia
- Family: Chrysomelidae
- Subfamily: Galerucinae
- Tribe: Galerucini
- Genus: Derospidea; Blake, 1931

Type species
- Trirhabda brevicollis J. L. LeConte, 1865

= Derospidea =

Genus of beetles

Derospidea is a genus of skeletonizing leaf beetles in the family Chrysomelidae. There are at least two described species in Derospidea. They are found in North America and Mexico.

== Species ==
These species belong to the genus Derospidea:

- Derospidea brevicollis (J. L. LeConte, 1865)
- Derospidea cyaneomaculata
- Derospidea ornata (Schaeffer, 1905)
