= Derospidea ornata =

Scientific classification
- Kingdom: Animalia
- Phylum: Arthropoda
- Clade: Pancrustacea
- Class: Insecta
- Order: Coleoptera
- Suborder: Polyphaga
- Infraorder: Cucujiformia
- Family: Chrysomelidae
- Genus: Derospidea
- Species: D. ornata

Binomial name
- Derospidea ornata (Schaeffer, 1905)

Species of beetle

Derospidea ornata is a species of skeletonizing leaf beetle in the family Chrysomelidae. It is found in Central America and North America.
