= Erynephala morosa =

Scientific classification
- Kingdom: Animalia
- Phylum: Arthropoda
- Clade: Pancrustacea
- Class: Insecta
- Order: Coleoptera
- Suborder: Polyphaga
- Infraorder: Cucujiformia
- Family: Chrysomelidae
- Genus: Erynephala
- Species: E. morosa

Binomial name
- Erynephala morosa (J. L. LeConte, 1857)

Species of beetle

Erynephala morosa is a species of skeletonizing leaf beetle in the family Chrysomelidae. It is found in North America.
