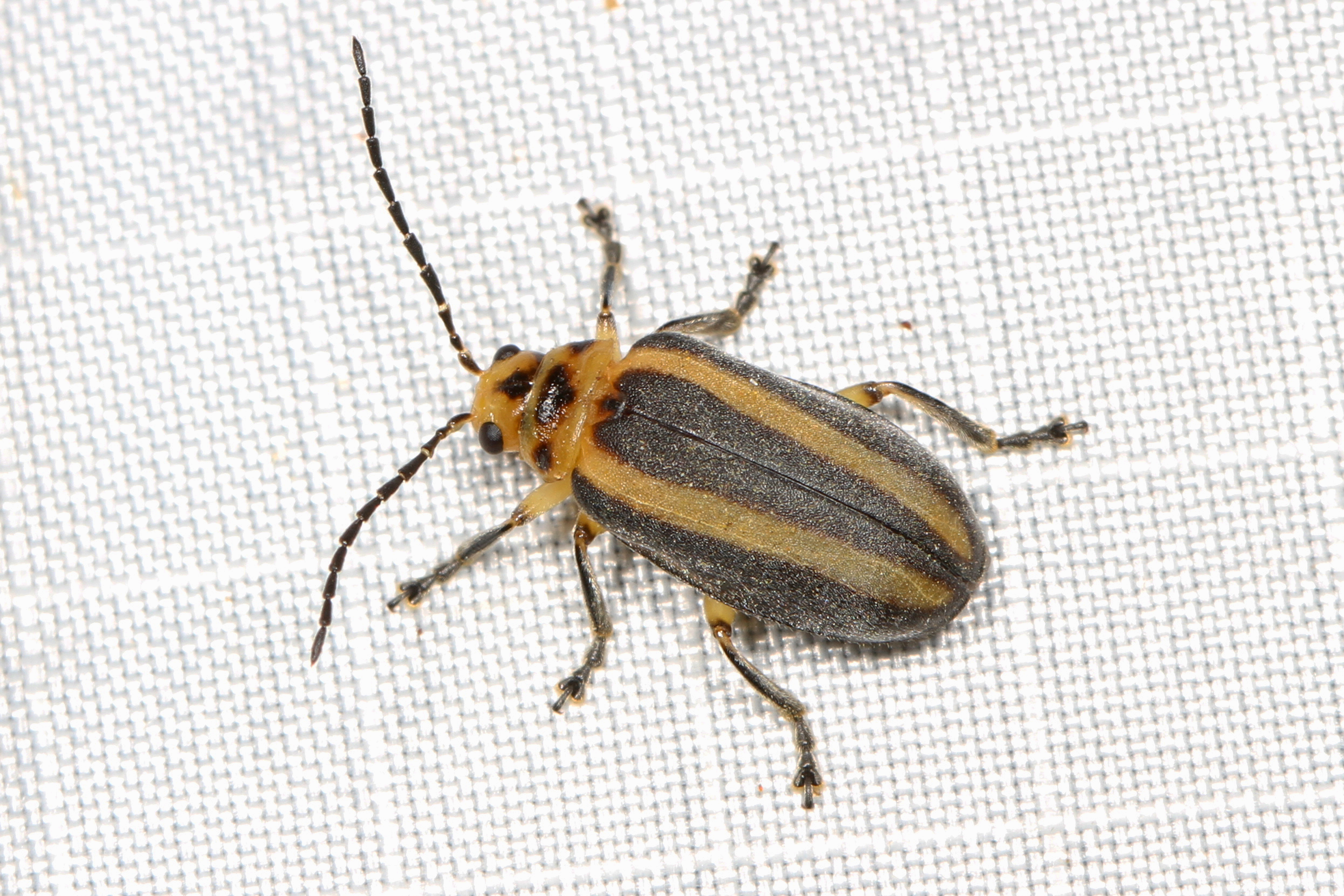

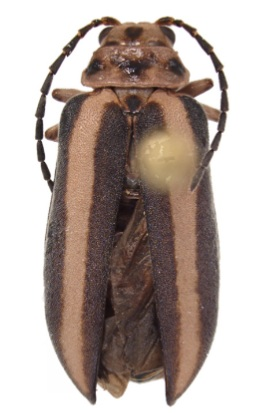

Scientific classification
- Kingdom: Animalia
- Phylum: Arthropoda
- Clade: Pancrustacea
- Class: Insecta
- Order: Coleoptera
- Suborder: Polyphaga
- Infraorder: Cucujiformia
- Family: Chrysomelidae
- Genus: Derospidea
- Species: D. brevicollis

Binomial name
- Derospidea brevicollis (J. L. LeConte, 1865)

Synonyms
- Trirhabda brevicollis J. L. LeConte, 1865

= Derospidea brevicollis =

Species of beetle

Derospidea brevicollis is a species of skeletonizing leaf beetle in the family Chrysomelidae.
