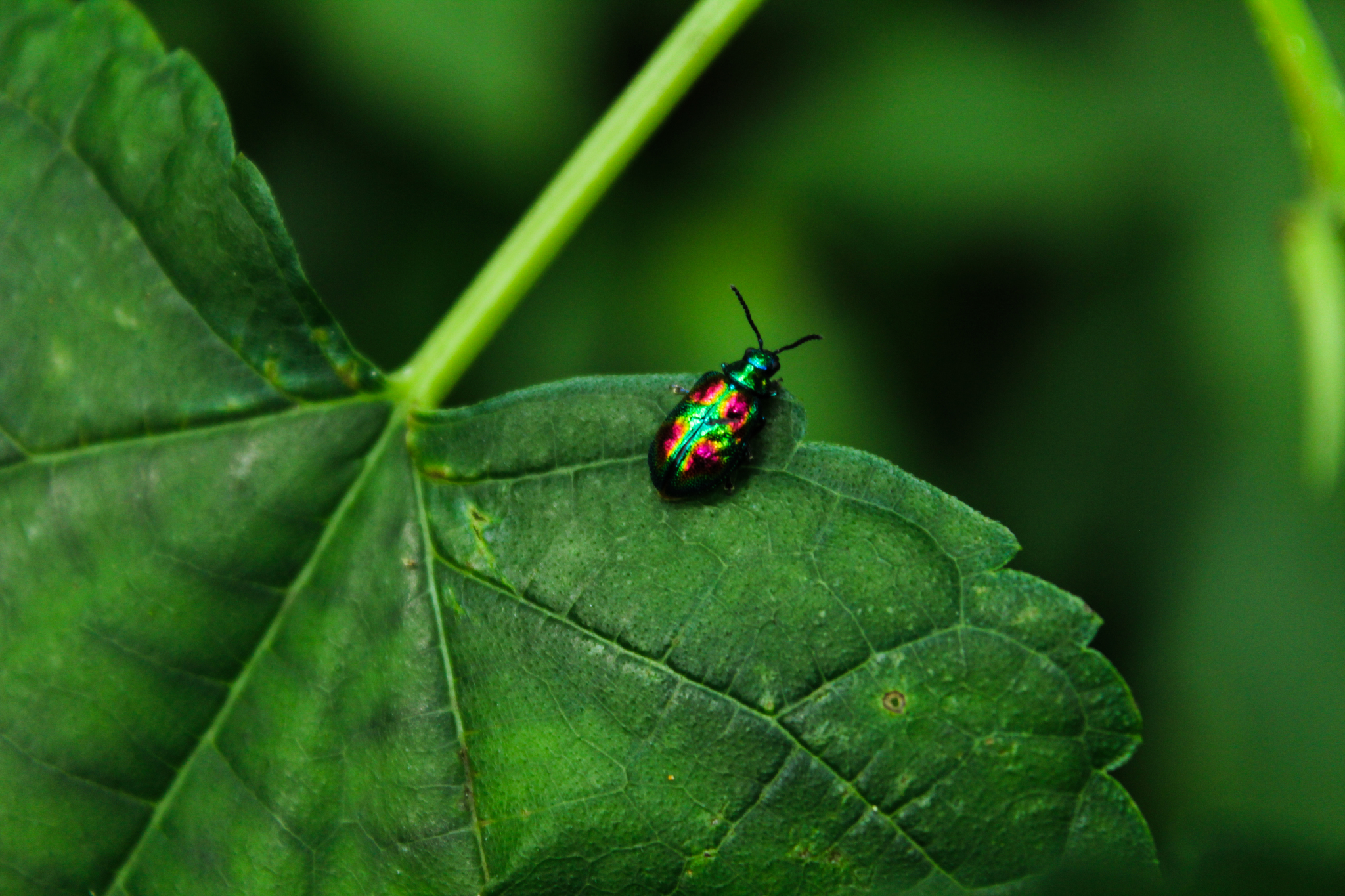
- Clitenella fulminans, Taiwan

Scientific classification
- Kingdom: Animalia
- Phylum: Arthropoda
- Clade: Pancrustacea
- Class: Insecta
- Order: Coleoptera
- Suborder: Polyphaga
- Infraorder: Cucujiformia
- Family: Chrysomelidae
- Subfamily: Galerucinae
- Tribe: Galerucini
- Genus: Clitenella
- Species: C. fulminans

Binomial name
- Clitenella fulminans (Faldermann, 1835)

= Clitenella fulminans =

Species of skeletonizing leaf beetle

Clitenella fulminans is a species of skeletonizing leaf beetle in the family Chrysomelidae. It is found in Taiwan and eastern Asia.
