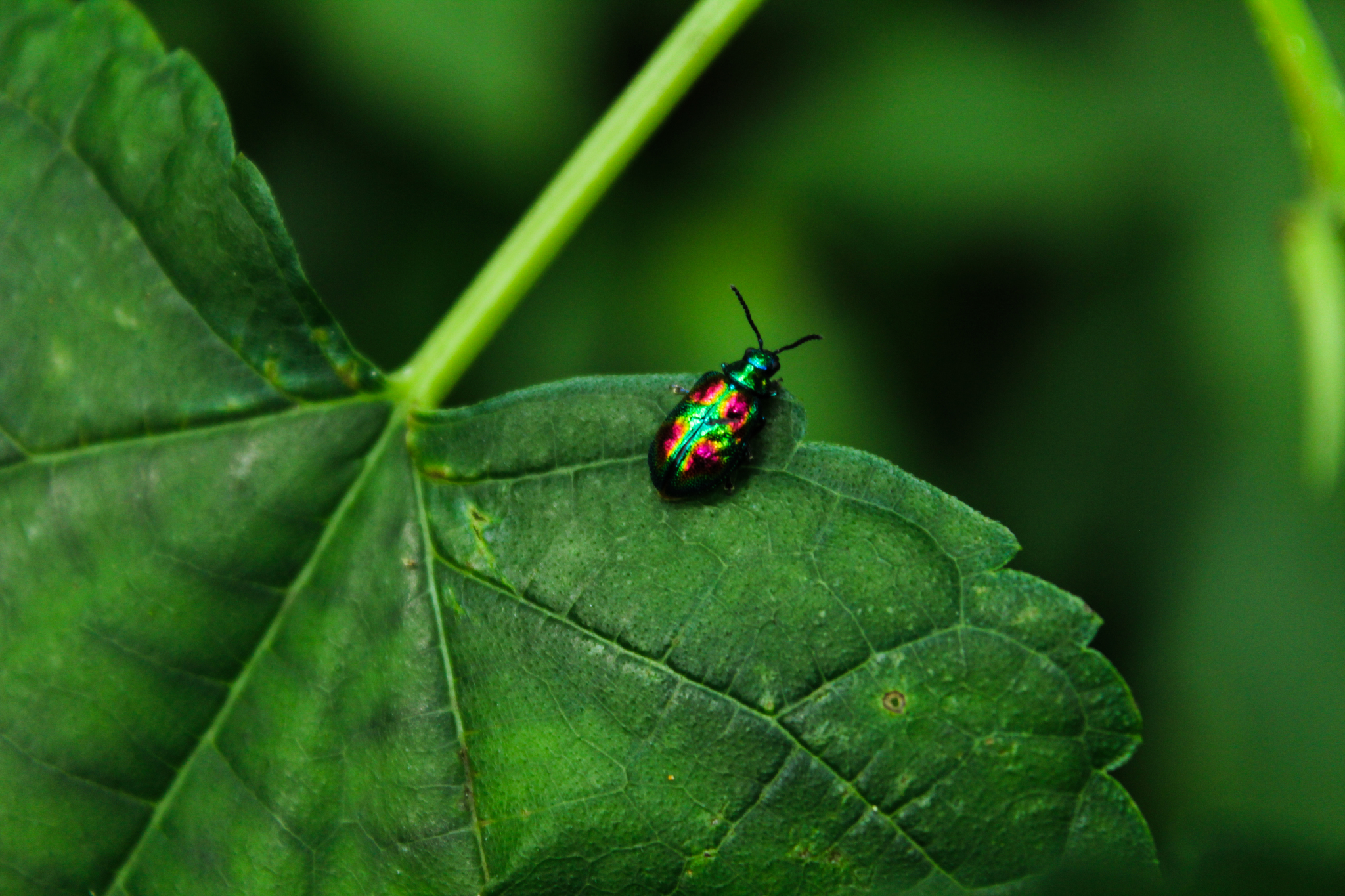
- Clitenella fulminans, Taiwan

Scientific classification
- Kingdom: Animalia
- Phylum: Arthropoda
- Clade: Pancrustacea
- Class: Insecta
- Order: Coleoptera
- Suborder: Polyphaga
- Infraorder: Cucujiformia
- Family: Chrysomelidae
- Subfamily: Galerucinae
- Tribe: Galerucini
- Genus: Clitenella; Laboissière, 1927

Synonyms
- Callopistria Chevrolat in Dejean, 1836

= Clitenella =

Genus of leaf beetles

Clitenella is a genus of skeletonizing leaf beetles in the family Chrysomelidae. There are five described species in Clitenella, found in Indomalaya and the Palearctic.

== Species ==
These five species belong to the genus Clitenella:

- Clitenella fulminans (Faldermann, 1835)
- Clitenella ignitincta (Fairmaire, 1878)
- Clitenella punctata Laboissiere, 1927 (synonym: Clitenella yunnana (Yang & Li, 1997))
- Clitenella purpureovittata (Chen, 1942)
- Clitenella unicolor Samoderzhenkov, 1988 (synonym: Clitenella sukarnoi Mohamedsaid, 2001)
