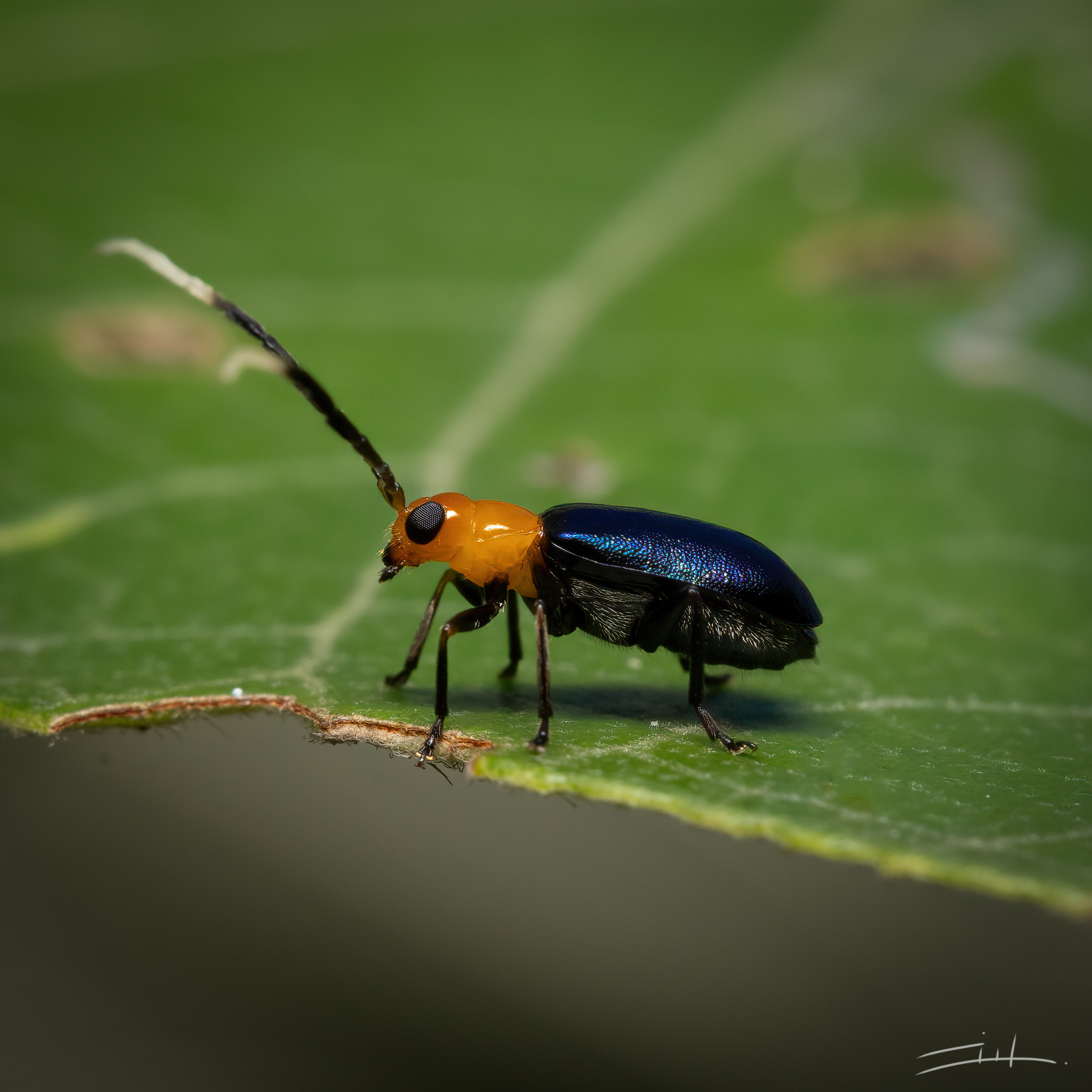
- Cornubrotica dilaticornis

Scientific classification
- Kingdom: Animalia
- Phylum: Arthropoda
- Clade: Pancrustacea
- Class: Insecta
- Order: Coleoptera
- Suborder: Polyphaga
- Infraorder: Cucujiformia
- Family: Chrysomelidae
- Tribe: Luperini
- Subtribe: Diabroticina
- Genus: Cornubrotica; Bechyné & Bechyné, 1969

= Cornubrotica =

Genus of leaf beetles

Cornubrotica is a genus of beetles belonging to the family Chrysomelidae.

== Species ==
- Cornubrotica dilaticornis (Baly, 1879)
- Cornubrotica iuba Moura, 2005
