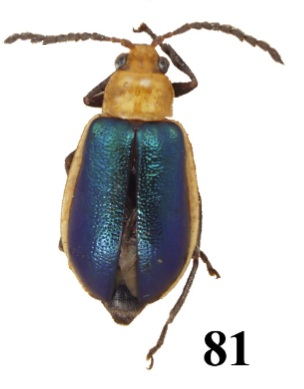

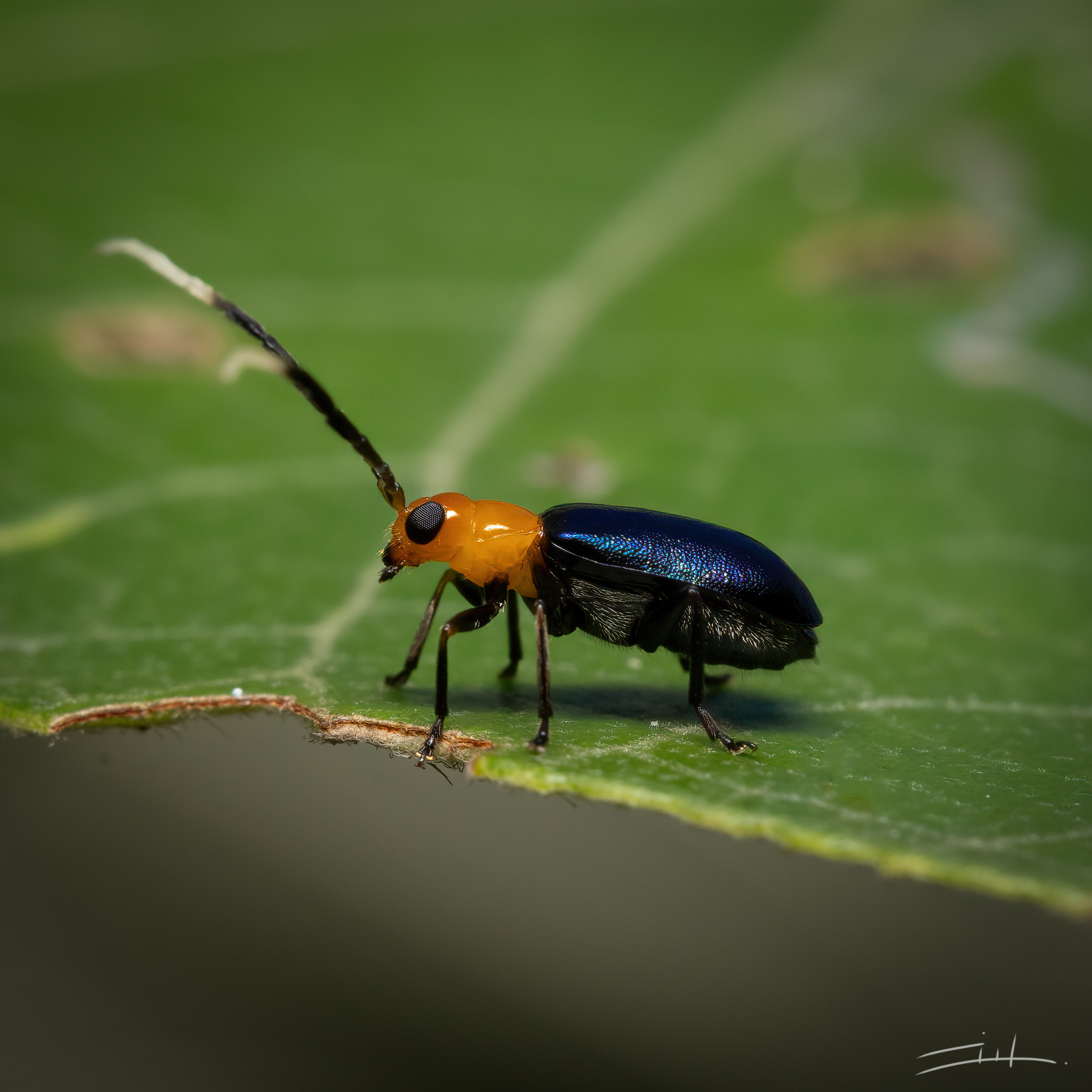

Scientific classification
- Kingdom: Animalia
- Phylum: Arthropoda
- Clade: Pancrustacea
- Class: Insecta
- Order: Coleoptera
- Suborder: Polyphaga
- Infraorder: Cucujiformia
- Family: Chrysomelidae
- Genus: Cornubrotica
- Species: C. dilaticornis

Binomial name
- Cornubrotica dilaticornis (Baly, 1879)

Synonyms
- Diabrotica dilaticornis Baly, 1879

= Cornubrotica dilaticornis =

Species of beetle

Cornubrotica dilaticornis is a species of beetle of the family Chrysomelidae. It is found in Ecuador.
