= Asbecesta verticalis =

Scientific classification
- Kingdom: Animalia
- Phylum: Arthropoda
- Clade: Pancrustacea
- Class: Insecta
- Order: Coleoptera
- Suborder: Polyphaga
- Infraorder: Cucujiformia
- Family: Chrysomelidae
- Subtribe: Aulacophorina
- Genus: Asbecesta
- Species: A. verticalis

Binomial name
- Asbecesta verticalis Laboissiere, 1937

Species of beetle

Asbecesta verticalis is a species of leaf beetle from the family Chrysomelidae. The species was first scientifically described in 1937 by Laboissiere. It is found in Africa, including Benin.
