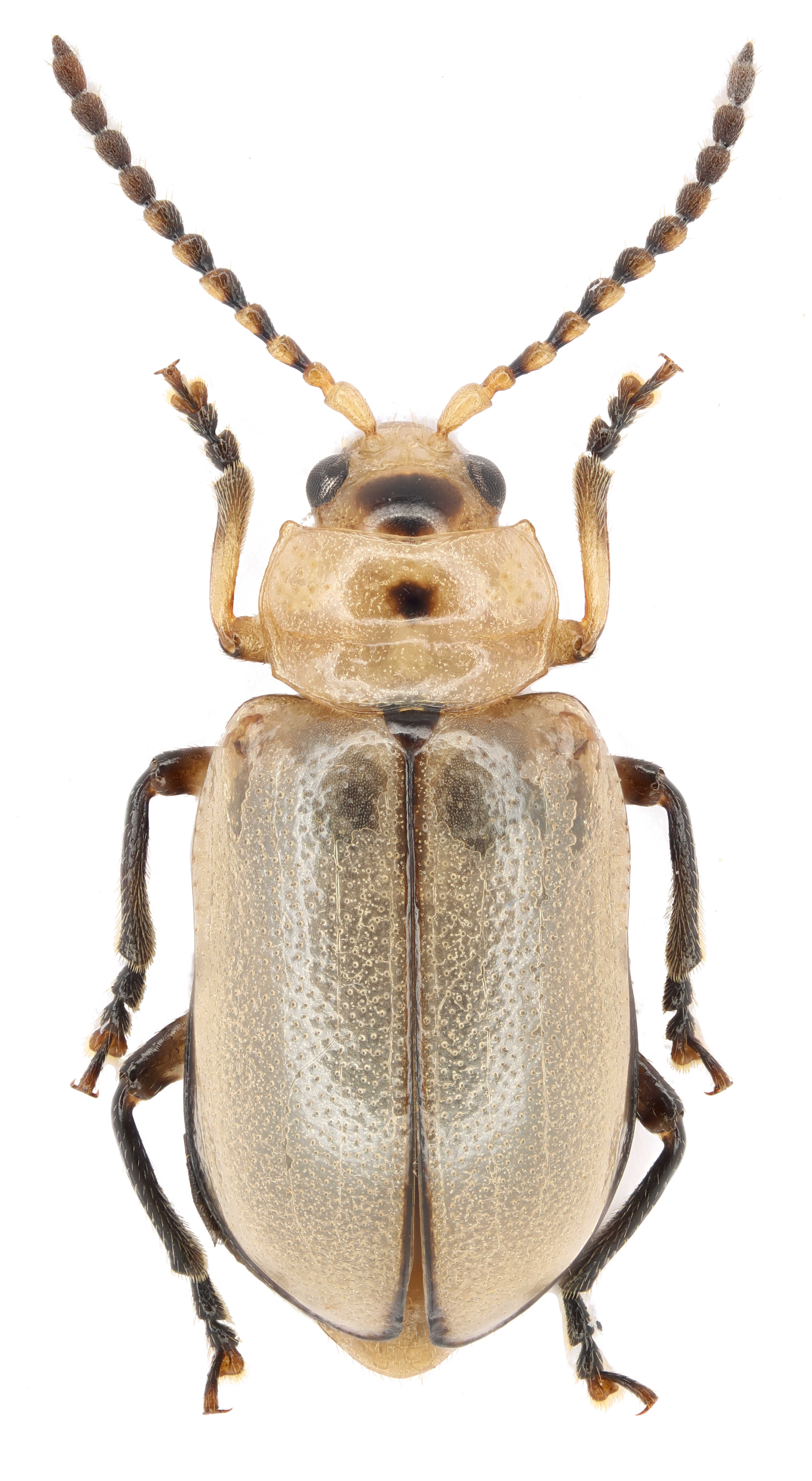
- Asbecesta cf. cincta Weise, 1904; Guinea

Scientific classification
- Kingdom: Animalia
- Phylum: Arthropoda
- Clade: Pancrustacea
- Class: Insecta
- Order: Coleoptera
- Suborder: Polyphaga
- Infraorder: Cucujiformia
- Family: Chrysomelidae
- Subfamily: Galerucinae
- Tribe: Luperini
- Subtribe: Aulacophorina
- Genus: Asbecesta; Harold, 1877

Species
- See text

= Asbecesta =

Genus of beetle

Asbecesta is a genus of leaf beetle from the family Chrysomelidae.

== Species ==
The following species are accepted within Asbecesta:

- Asbecesta abdominalis Jacoby, 1895
- Asbecesta beinearti Laboissière, 1938
- Asbecesta biplagiata Jacoby, 1895
- Asbecesta breviuscula Weise, 1904
- Asbecesta bryanti Wilcox, 1972
- Asbecesta capensis Allard, 1888
- Asbecesta carinata Laboissière, 1931
- Asbecesta commoda Weise, 1906
- Asbecesta congoensis Laboissière, 1929
- Asbecesta costalis Weise, 1912
- Asbecesta cyanipennis Harold, 1877
- Asbecesta dimidiaticornis Jacoby, 1903
- Asbecesta feai Laboissière, 1937
- Asbecesta festiva Laboissière, 1919
- Asbecesta fulvicornis Jacoby, 1895
- Asbecesta fulviventris Weise, 1895
- Asbecesta gyldenstolpei Weise, 1924
- Asbecesta hintzi Weise, 1901
- Asbecesta icterica Weise, 1902
- Asbecesta ituriensis Weise, 1924
- Asbecesta laeta Weise, 1905
- Asbecesta lesnei Laboissière, 1931
- Asbecesta marginata Jacoby, 1899
- Asbecesta monardi Laboissière, 1931
- Asbecesta nigripennis Weise, 1909
- Asbecesta nigripes Bryant, 1958
- Asbecesta ornata Jacoby, 1900
- Asbecesta ornaticollis Jacoby, 1900
- Asbecesta pectoralis Jacoby, 1895
- Asbecesta perplexa Allard, 1888
- Asbecesta pilifera Weise, 1909
- Asbecesta polita Jacoby, 1899
- Asbecesta punctata Laboissière, 1919
- Asbecesta punctipennis Bryant
- Asbecesta purpurea Laboissière, 1937
- Asbecesta purpureipennis Bryant, 1959
- Asbecesta quadripustulata Laboissière, 1940
- Asbecesta robusta Weise, 1912
- Asbecesta rugosa Jacoby, 1895
- Asbecesta ruwensorica Weise, 1912
- Asbecesta sobrina Weise, 1905
- Asbecesta terminalis Weise, 1901
- Asbecesta verticalis Laboissière, 1937
- Asbecesta vicina Weise, 1903
- Asbecesta wittei Laboissière, 1939
