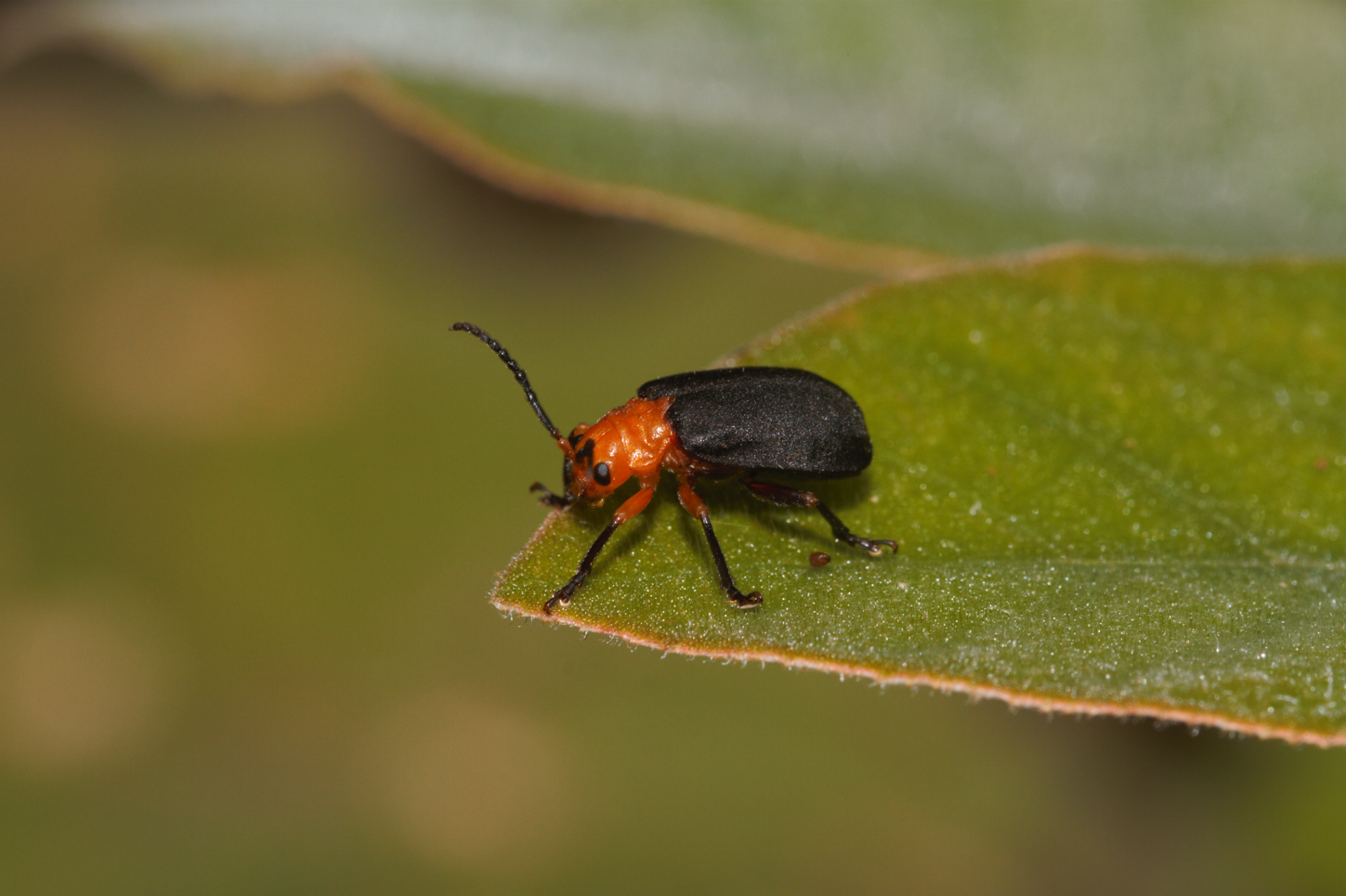
- Dircema ruficrus

Scientific classification
- Kingdom: Animalia
- Phylum: Arthropoda
- Clade: Pancrustacea
- Class: Insecta
- Order: Coleoptera
- Suborder: Polyphaga
- Infraorder: Cucujiformia
- Family: Chrysomelidae
- Subfamily: Galerucinae
- Tribe: Galerucini
- Genus: Dircema; Clark, 1865

= Dircema =

Genus of leaf beetles

Dircema is a genus of beetles belonging to the family Chrysomelidae.

== Species ==
- Dircema aegidia
- Dircema chanchamayense
- Dircema cinctipenne
- Dircema columbicum
- Dircema cyanipenne
- Dircema discedens
- Dircema discoidale
- Dircema divisum
- Dircema evidens
- Dircema femininum
- Dircema freyi
- Dircema jacobyi
- Dircema laetum
- Dircema laticolle
- Dircema marginatum
- Dircema modestum
- Dircema nigripenne (Fabricius, 1792)
- Dircema occipitale
- Dircema peruanum
- Dircema pulchrum
- Dircema ruficrus
- Dircema rufipenne
- Dircema sordidum
- Dircema weyrauchi
- Dircema zezia
