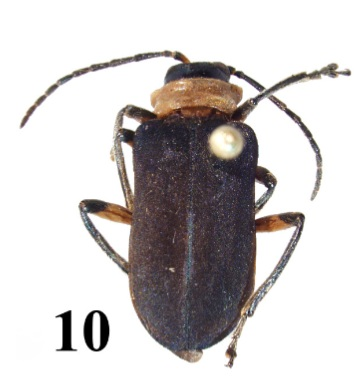

Scientific classification
- Kingdom: Animalia
- Phylum: Arthropoda
- Clade: Pancrustacea
- Class: Insecta
- Order: Coleoptera
- Suborder: Polyphaga
- Infraorder: Cucujiformia
- Family: Chrysomelidae
- Genus: Dircema
- Species: D. nigripenne

Binomial name
- Dircema nigripenne (Fabricius, 1792)

Synonyms
- Galleruca nigripennis Fabricius, 1792

= Dircema nigripenne =

Species of beetle

Dircema nigripenne is a species of beetle of the family Chrysomelidae. It is found in South America.
