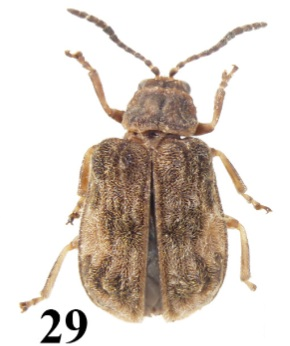

Scientific classification
- Kingdom: Animalia
- Phylum: Arthropoda
- Clade: Pancrustacea
- Class: Insecta
- Order: Coleoptera
- Suborder: Polyphaga
- Infraorder: Cucujiformia
- Family: Chrysomelidae
- Genus: Yingaresca
- Species: Y. difficilis

Binomial name
- Yingaresca difficilis (Bowditch, 1923)

Synonyms
- Galerucella difficilis Bowditch, 1923

= Yingaresca difficilis =

Species of beetle

Yingaresca difficilis is a species of beetle of the family Chrysomelidae. It is found in Brazil.
