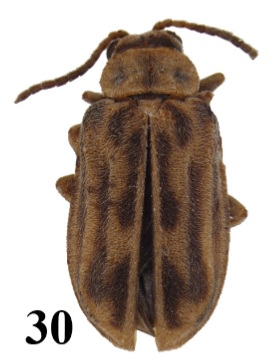

Scientific classification
- Kingdom: Animalia
- Phylum: Arthropoda
- Clade: Pancrustacea
- Class: Insecta
- Order: Coleoptera
- Suborder: Polyphaga
- Infraorder: Cucujiformia
- Family: Chrysomelidae
- Genus: Yingaresca
- Species: Y. fuscomaculata

Binomial name
- Yingaresca fuscomaculata (Jacoby, 1886)

Synonyms
- Galerucella fuscomaculata Jacoby, 1886

= Yingaresca fuscomaculata =

Species of beetle

Yingaresca fuscomaculata is a species of beetle of the family Chrysomelidae. It is found in Mexico, Guatemala, Honduras, El Salvador, Nicaragua and Panama.
