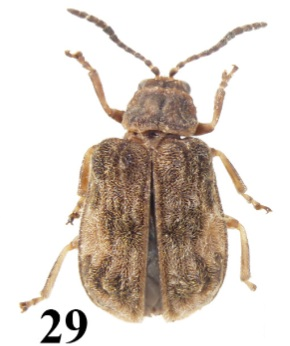
- Yingaresca

Scientific classification
- Kingdom: Animalia
- Phylum: Arthropoda
- Clade: Pancrustacea
- Class: Insecta
- Order: Coleoptera
- Suborder: Polyphaga
- Infraorder: Cucujiformia
- Family: Chrysomelidae
- Subfamily: Galerucinae
- Tribe: Galerucini
- Genus: Yingaresca; Bechyné, 1956

= Yingaresca =

Genus of leaf beetles

Yingaresca is a genus of beetles belonging to the family Chrysomelidae.

== Species ==
- Yingaresca absimilis (Weise, 1921)
- Yingaresca amabilis (Jacoby, 1892)
- Yingaresca amazonica (Weise, 1921)
- Yingaresca batesi (Bowditch, 1923)
- Yingaresca bohiensis (Bowditch, 1923)
- Yingaresca bowditchi (Blackwelder, 1923)
- Yingaresca brevicollis (Blake, 1934)
- Yingaresca brevivittata (Blake, 1968)
- Yingaresca chrysura (Blake, 1939)
- Yingaresca colasi Bechyne, 1956
- Yingaresca conifera Bechyne, 1956
- Yingaresca constanzae (Blake, 1939)
- Yingaresca cyclopea (Blake, 1934)
- Yingaresca devota (Erichson, 1847)
- Yingaresca difficilis (Bowditch, 1923)
- Yingaresca echinoderma Bechyne, 1956
- Yingaresca freyi (Bechyne, 1956)
- Yingaresca fulvonigra (Faimaire, 1884)
- Yingaresca fuscomaculata (Jacoby, 1886)
- Yingaresca terminalis (Jacoby, 1892)
- Yingaresca hexarhabdota (Blake, 1965)
- Yingaresca holosericea (Bowditch, 1923)
- Yingaresca inaequalis (Weise, 1924)
- Yingaresca jamaicensis (Blake, 1965)
- Yingaresca labida (Erichson, 1847)
- Yingaresca laticollis (Bechyne & Bechyne, 1962)
- Yingaresca maculipennis (Bowditch, 1923)
- Yingaresca maculipes (Blake, 1930)
- Yingaresca melanocephala (Blake, 1959)
- Yingaresca nerea Bechyne & Bechyne, 1962
- Yingaresca obsurofasciata (Jacoby, 1890)
- Yingaresca ornata (Jacoby, 1889)
- Yingaresca orthodera (Blake, 1934)
- Yingaresca oteroi (Blake, 1934)
- Yingaresca pauperata (Blake, 1934)
- Yingaresca pereirai (Bechyne, 1956)
- Yingaresca poeciloptera (Bechyne, 1956)
- Yingaresca scurrilis (Bechyne, 1956)
- Yingaresca spiloptera (Blake, 1959)
- Yingaresca terminalis (Jacoby, 1892)
- Yingaresca varicornis (Weise, 1885)
- Yingaresca venustula (Suffrian, 1867)
- Yingaresca volatilis (Bechyne & Bechyne, 1961)
- Yingaresca wolcotti (Bryant, 1924)
- Yingaresca zezia (Bechyne, 1956)
