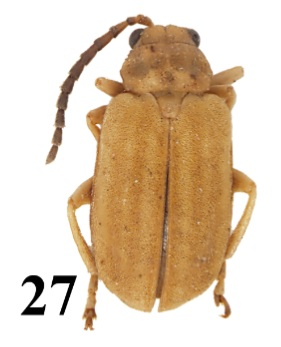
- Itaitubana alternata

Scientific classification
- Kingdom: Animalia
- Phylum: Arthropoda
- Clade: Pancrustacea
- Class: Insecta
- Order: Coleoptera
- Suborder: Polyphaga
- Infraorder: Cucujiformia
- Family: Chrysomelidae
- Subfamily: Galerucinae
- Tribe: Galerucini
- Genus: Itaitubana; Bechyné, 1963

= Itaitubana =

Genus of leaf beetles

Itaitubana is a genus of beetles belonging to the family Chrysomelidae.

== Species ==
- Itaitubana alternata (Jacoby, 1886)
- Itaitubana elegans (Bowditch, 1923)
- Itaitubana conjuncta (Bowditch, 1923)
- Itaitubana illigata (Erichson, 1847)
- Itaitubana lineatipennis (Jacoby, 1886)
- Itaitubana peruviana (Bowditch, 1923)
- Itaitubana spinipennis (Bowditch, 1923)
- Itaitubana vittata (Bowditch, 1923)
- Itaitubana univittata (Bowditch, 1923)
