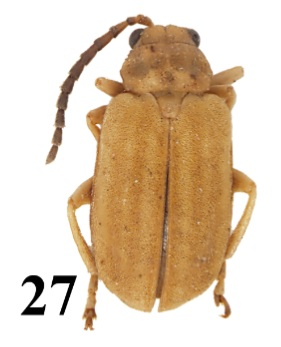

Scientific classification
- Kingdom: Animalia
- Phylum: Arthropoda
- Clade: Pancrustacea
- Class: Insecta
- Order: Coleoptera
- Suborder: Polyphaga
- Infraorder: Cucujiformia
- Family: Chrysomelidae
- Genus: Itaitubana
- Species: I. alternata

Binomial name
- Itaitubana alternata (Jacoby, 1886)

Synonyms
- Galerucella alternata Jacoby, 1886

= Itaitubana alternata =

Species of beetle

Itaitubana alternata is a species of beetle of the family Chrysomelidae. It is found in Mexico (Oaxaca), Guatemala, Nicaragua and Panama.
