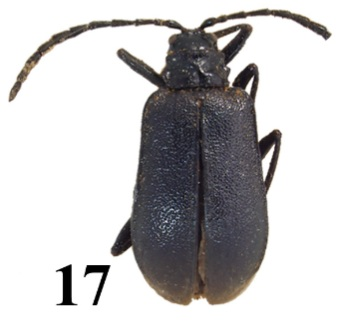

Scientific classification
- Kingdom: Animalia
- Phylum: Arthropoda
- Clade: Pancrustacea
- Class: Insecta
- Order: Coleoptera
- Suborder: Polyphaga
- Infraorder: Cucujiformia
- Family: Chrysomelidae
- Genus: Socorroita
- Species: S. elvira

Binomial name
- Socorroita elvira Bechyné, 1956

= Socorroita elvira =

Species of beetle

Socorroita elvira is a species of beetle in the family Chrysomelidae. It is found in Colombia.
