= Socorroita =

Scientific classification
- Kingdom: Animalia
- Phylum: Arthropoda
- Clade: Pancrustacea
- Class: Insecta
- Order: Coleoptera
- Suborder: Polyphaga
- Infraorder: Cucujiformia
- Family: Chrysomelidae
- Subfamily: Galerucinae
- Tribe: Galerucini
- Genus: Socorroita; Bechyné, 1956

Genus of leaf beetles

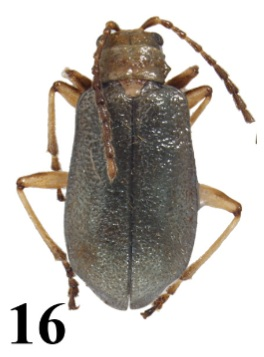
Socorroita carinipennis

Socorroita is a genus of beetles belonging to the family Chrysomelidae.

== Species ==
- Socorroita carinipennis (Bowditch, 1923)
- Socorroita elvira Bechyné, 1956
