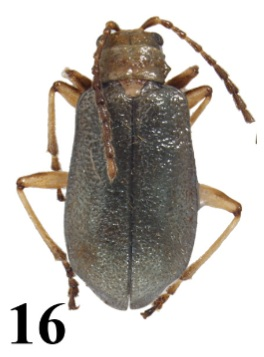

Scientific classification
- Kingdom: Animalia
- Phylum: Arthropoda
- Clade: Pancrustacea
- Class: Insecta
- Order: Coleoptera
- Suborder: Polyphaga
- Infraorder: Cucujiformia
- Family: Chrysomelidae
- Genus: Socorroita
- Species: S. carinipennis

Binomial name
- Socorroita carinipennis (Bowditch, 1923)

Synonyms
- Monocesta carinipennis Bowditch, 1923

= Socorroita carinipennis =

Species of beetle

Socorroita carinipennis is a species of beetle in the family Chrysomelidae. It is found in Colombia.
