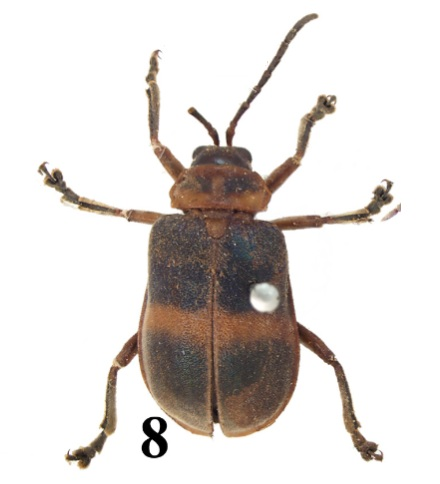
- Chorina cincta

Scientific classification
- Kingdom: Animalia
- Phylum: Arthropoda
- Clade: Pancrustacea
- Class: Insecta
- Order: Coleoptera
- Suborder: Polyphaga
- Infraorder: Cucujiformia
- Family: Chrysomelidae
- Subfamily: Galerucinae
- Tribe: Galerucini
- Genus: Chorina; Baly, 1866

= Chorina =

Genus of leaf beetles

Chorina is a genus of beetles belonging to the family Chrysomelidae. This genus includes three described species, all of which occur in Brazil.

== Species ==
- Chorina cincta (Clark, 1865)
- Chorina fasciata Weise, 1921
- Chorina obliquenotata (Clark, 1865)
