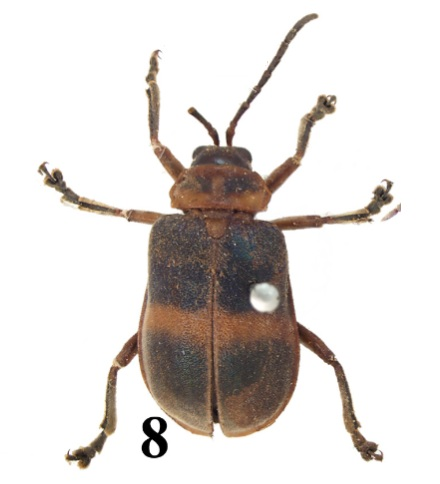

Scientific classification
- Kingdom: Animalia
- Phylum: Arthropoda
- Clade: Pancrustacea
- Class: Insecta
- Order: Coleoptera
- Suborder: Polyphaga
- Infraorder: Cucujiformia
- Family: Chrysomelidae
- Genus: Chorina
- Species: C. cincta

Binomial name
- Chorina cincta (Clark, 1865)

Synonyms
- Monocesta cincta Clark, 1865

= Chorina cincta =

Species of beetle

Chorina cincta is a species of beetle of the family Chrysomelidae. It is found in Brazil.
