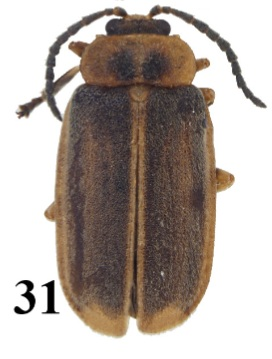
- Metrogaleruca

Scientific classification
- Kingdom: Animalia
- Phylum: Arthropoda
- Clade: Pancrustacea
- Class: Insecta
- Order: Coleoptera
- Suborder: Polyphaga
- Infraorder: Cucujiformia
- Family: Chrysomelidae
- Subfamily: Galerucinae
- Tribe: Galerucini
- Genus: Metrogaleruca; Bechyné & Springlová de Bechyné, 1969

= Metrogaleruca =

Genus of leaf beetles

Metrogaleruca is a genus of beetles belonging to the family Chrysomelidae.

== Species ==
- Metrogaleruca antonia (Bechyne & Bechyne, 1965)
- Metrogaleruca lateralis (Jacoby, 1887)
- Metrogaleruca longula (Bechyne, 1954)
- Metrogaleruca obscura (Degeer, 1775)
- Metrogaleruca plaumanni (Bechyne, 1954)
