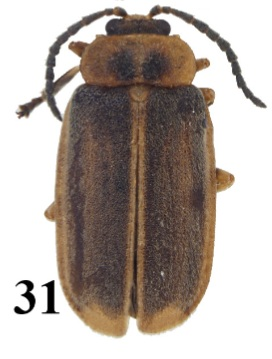

Scientific classification
- Kingdom: Animalia
- Phylum: Arthropoda
- Clade: Pancrustacea
- Class: Insecta
- Order: Coleoptera
- Suborder: Polyphaga
- Infraorder: Cucujiformia
- Family: Chrysomelidae
- Genus: Metrogaleruca
- Species: M. obscura

Binomial name
- Metrogaleruca obscura (Degeer, 1775)

Synonyms
- Chrysomela fuliginosa; Chrysomela obscura; Gaerucella obscura De Geer, 1775; Galeruca livida Olivier, 1791; Galerucella fuliginosa Gmelin, 1790; Schematiza cordiae Barber, 1947; Schematiza livida

= Metrogaleruca obscura =

Species of beetle

Metrogaleruca obscura is a species of beetle of the family Chrysomelidae. It is found in Guadeloupe, Trinidad, Venezuela, Suriname, French Guiana, Brazil, Bolivia, Paraguay and Argentina.
