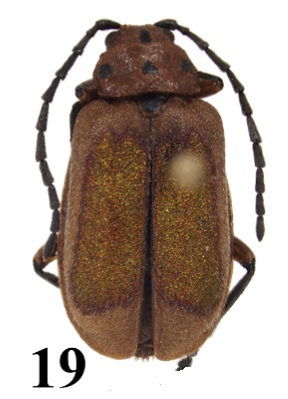
- Nestinus bimaculatus

Scientific classification
- Kingdom: Animalia
- Phylum: Arthropoda
- Clade: Pancrustacea
- Class: Insecta
- Order: Coleoptera
- Suborder: Polyphaga
- Infraorder: Cucujiformia
- Family: Chrysomelidae
- Subfamily: Galerucinae
- Tribe: Galerucini
- Genus: Nestinus; Clark, 1865

Synonyms
- Monotia Jacoby, 1880

= Nestinus =

Genus of leaf beetles

Nestinus is a genus of beetles belonging to the family Chrysomelidae.

== Species ==
- Nestinus auriquadrum
- Nestinus bimaculatus
- Nestinus flavomarginatus
- Nestinus incertus
- Nestinus longicornis
- Nestinus modesta
- Nestinus regalis
- Nestinus viridis
