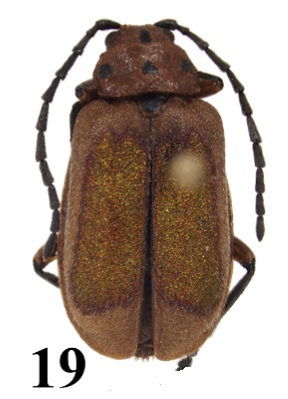

Scientific classification
- Kingdom: Animalia
- Phylum: Arthropoda
- Clade: Pancrustacea
- Class: Insecta
- Order: Coleoptera
- Suborder: Polyphaga
- Infraorder: Cucujiformia
- Family: Chrysomelidae
- Genus: Nestinus
- Species: N. bimaculatus

Binomial name
- Nestinus bimaculatus Clark, 1865

= Nestinus bimaculatus =

Species of beetle

Nestinus bimaculatus is a species of beetle of the family Chrysomelidae. It is found in Guatemala.
