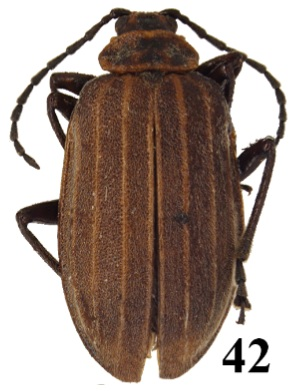

Scientific classification
- Kingdom: Animalia
- Phylum: Arthropoda
- Clade: Pancrustacea
- Class: Insecta
- Order: Coleoptera
- Suborder: Polyphaga
- Infraorder: Cucujiformia
- Family: Chrysomelidae
- Genus: Iucetima
- Species: I. minor

Binomial name
- Iucetima minor (Bechyné, 1954)

Synonyms
- Neolochmaea quadrilineata minor Bechyné, 1954

= Iucetima minor =

Species of beetle

Iucetima minor is a species of beetle of the family Chrysomelidae. It is found in Brazil, Paraguay and Argentina.
