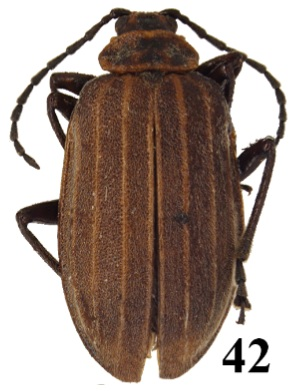
- Iucetima

Scientific classification
- Kingdom: Animalia
- Phylum: Arthropoda
- Clade: Pancrustacea
- Class: Insecta
- Order: Coleoptera
- Suborder: Polyphaga
- Infraorder: Cucujiformia
- Family: Chrysomelidae
- Subfamily: Galerucinae
- Tribe: Galerucini
- Genus: Iucetima; Moura, 1998

= Iucetima =

Genus of leaf beetles

Iucetima is a genus of beetles belonging to the family Chrysomelidae found in Brazil, Paraguay, and Argentina.

== Species ==
- Iucetima acrocostata (Bechyné & Bechyné, 1969)
- Iucetima costifera (Bechyné & Bechyné, 1969)
- Iucetima minor (Bechyné, 1954)
