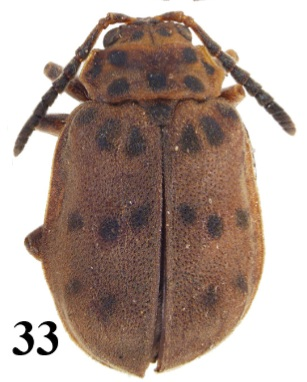

Scientific classification
- Kingdom: Animalia
- Phylum: Arthropoda
- Clade: Pancrustacea
- Class: Insecta
- Order: Coleoptera
- Suborder: Polyphaga
- Infraorder: Cucujiformia
- Family: Chrysomelidae
- Genus: Platynocera
- Species: P. murina

Binomial name
- Platynocera murina Blanchard, 1846

= Platynocera murina =

Species of beetle

Platynocera murina is a species of beetle of the family Chrysomelidae. It is found in Bolivia, and Paraguay.
