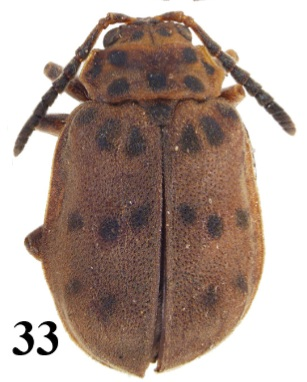
- Platynocera

Scientific classification
- Kingdom: Animalia
- Phylum: Arthropoda
- Clade: Pancrustacea
- Class: Insecta
- Order: Coleoptera
- Suborder: Polyphaga
- Infraorder: Cucujiformia
- Family: Chrysomelidae
- Subfamily: Galerucinae
- Tribe: Galerucini
- Genus: Platynocera; Blanchard, 1846

Synonyms
- Corynocesta Bechyné, 1956

= Platynocera =

Genus of leaf beetles

Platynocera is a genus of beetles belonging to the family Chrysomelidae.

== Species ==
- Platynocera anicohi (Bechyne & Bechyne, 1961)
- Platynocera glabra (Blake, 1936)
- Platynocera murina (Blanchard, 1846)
- Platynocera peruviana (Bechyne, 1956)
