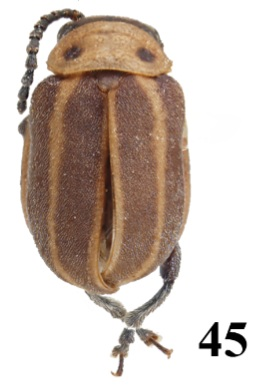
- Gonaives

Scientific classification
- Kingdom: Animalia
- Phylum: Arthropoda
- Clade: Pancrustacea
- Class: Insecta
- Order: Coleoptera
- Suborder: Polyphaga
- Infraorder: Cucujiformia
- Family: Chrysomelidae
- Subfamily: Galerucinae
- Tribe: Galerucini
- Genus: Gonaives; Clark, 1987

= Gonaives (beetle) =

Genus of leaf beetles

Gonaives is a genus of beetles belonging to the family Chrysomelidae.

== Species ==
- Gonaives buenae Clark, 1987
