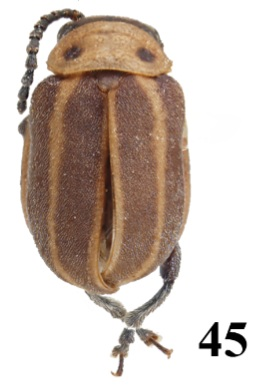

Scientific classification
- Kingdom: Animalia
- Phylum: Arthropoda
- Clade: Pancrustacea
- Class: Insecta
- Order: Coleoptera
- Suborder: Polyphaga
- Infraorder: Cucujiformia
- Family: Chrysomelidae
- Genus: Gonaives
- Species: G. buenae

Binomial name
- Gonaives buenae Clark, 1987

= Gonaives buenae =

Species of beetle

Gonaives buenae is a species of beetle of the family Chrysomelidae. It is found on Haiti.

== Description ==
Adults reach a length of about 3.9–5.1 mm. The pronotum is testaceous with two dark spots and the elytron is dark brown with a pale stripe and margin.

== Etymology ==
The species is named in honour of Mrs. Buena Valentine who together with her husband, Dr. Barry Valentine, collected the type series of this species.
