= Parabrotica =

Scientific classification
- Kingdom: Animalia
- Phylum: Arthropoda
- Clade: Pancrustacea
- Class: Insecta
- Order: Coleoptera
- Suborder: Polyphaga
- Infraorder: Cucujiformia
- Family: Chrysomelidae
- Tribe: Luperini
- Subtribe: Diabroticina
- Genus: Parabrotica; Bechyné & Bechyné, 1961

Synonyms
- Neotrichota Blake, 1966

Genus of leaf beetles

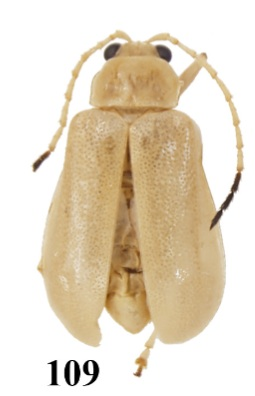
Parabrotica subtilis, 2022

Parabrotica is a genus of beetles belonging to the family Chrysomelidae.

== Species ==
- Parabrotica decolor Bechyne & Bechyne, 1961
- Parabrotica litura (Weise, 1921)
- Parabrotica subtilis (Weise, 1921)
