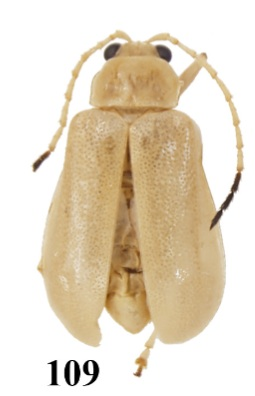

Scientific classification
- Kingdom: Animalia
- Phylum: Arthropoda
- Clade: Pancrustacea
- Class: Insecta
- Order: Coleoptera
- Suborder: Polyphaga
- Infraorder: Cucujiformia
- Family: Chrysomelidae
- Genus: Parabrotica
- Species: P. subtilis

Binomial name
- Parabrotica subtilis (Weise, 1921)

= Parabrotica subtilis =

Species of beetle

Parabrotica subtilis is a species of beetle of the family Chrysomelidae. It is found in the Neotropical ecozone.
