= Syphaxia =

Scientific classification
- Kingdom: Animalia
- Phylum: Arthropoda
- Clade: Pancrustacea
- Class: Insecta
- Order: Coleoptera
- Suborder: Polyphaga
- Infraorder: Cucujiformia
- Family: Chrysomelidae
- Subfamily: Galerucinae
- Tribe: Galerucini
- Genus: Syphaxia; Baly, 1866

Genus of leaf beetles

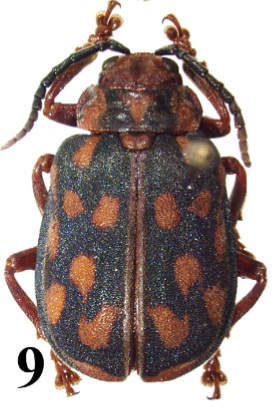

Syphaxia is a genus of beetles belonging to the family Chrysomelidae.

== Species ==
- Syphaxia maculata Jacoby, 1899
- Syphaxia spectanda (Clark, 1865)
