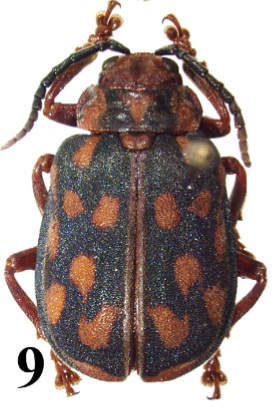

Scientific classification
- Kingdom: Animalia
- Phylum: Arthropoda
- Clade: Pancrustacea
- Class: Insecta
- Order: Coleoptera
- Suborder: Polyphaga
- Infraorder: Cucujiformia
- Family: Chrysomelidae
- Genus: Syphaxia
- Species: S. maculata

Binomial name
- Syphaxia maculata Jacoby, 1899

= Syphaxia maculata =

Species of beetle

Syphaxia maculata is a species of beetle of the family Chrysomelidae. It is found in Peru.

== Description ==
Adults reach a length of about 13 mm. Adults have black antennae and have two black spots on the thorax. The elytron is greenish with eight fulvous spots.
