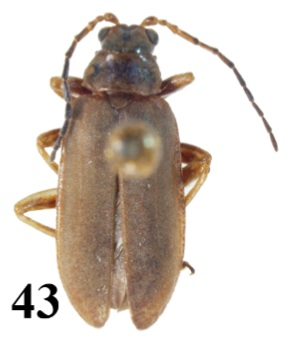
- Chlorolochmaea

Scientific classification
- Kingdom: Animalia
- Phylum: Arthropoda
- Clade: Pancrustacea
- Class: Insecta
- Order: Coleoptera
- Suborder: Polyphaga
- Infraorder: Cucujiformia
- Family: Chrysomelidae
- Subfamily: Galerucinae
- Tribe: Galerucini
- Genus: Chlorolochmaea; Bechyné & Springlová de Bechyné 1969

= Chlorolochmaea =

Genus of leaf beetles

Chlorolochmaea is a genus of beetles belonging to the family Chrysomelidae.

== Species ==
- Chlorolochmaea parallela (Bowditch, 1923)
