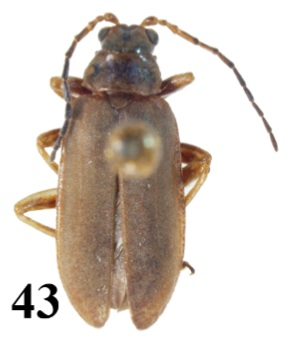

Scientific classification
- Kingdom: Animalia
- Phylum: Arthropoda
- Clade: Pancrustacea
- Class: Insecta
- Order: Coleoptera
- Suborder: Polyphaga
- Infraorder: Cucujiformia
- Family: Chrysomelidae
- Genus: Chlorolochmaea
- Species: C. parallela

Binomial name
- Chlorolochmaea parallela (Bowditch, 1923)

Synonyms
- Monocesta parallela Bowditch, 1923

= Chlorolochmaea parallela =

Species of beetle

Chlorolochmaea parallela is a species of beetle of the family Chrysomelidae. It is found in Brazil and Argentina.
