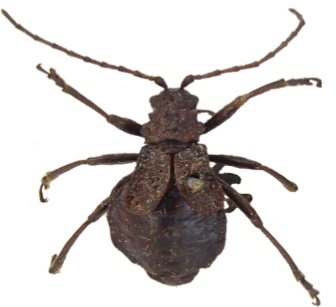

Scientific classification
- Kingdom: Animalia
- Phylum: Arthropoda
- Clade: Pancrustacea
- Class: Insecta
- Order: Coleoptera
- Suborder: Polyphaga
- Infraorder: Cucujiformia
- Family: Chrysomelidae
- Genus: Metalepta
- Species: M. degandii

Binomial name
- Metalepta degandii Baly, 1961

= Metalepta degandii =

Species of beetle

Metalepta degandii is a species of beetle of the family Chrysomelidae. It is found in Peru.

== Description ==
Adults reach a length of about 11.5 mm. The head, pronotum and elytron are rufous brown.
