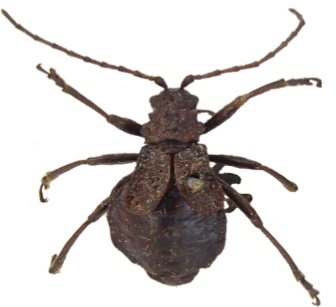
- Metalepta

Scientific classification
- Kingdom: Animalia
- Phylum: Arthropoda
- Clade: Pancrustacea
- Class: Insecta
- Order: Coleoptera
- Suborder: Polyphaga
- Infraorder: Cucujiformia
- Family: Chrysomelidae
- Subfamily: Galerucinae
- Tribe: Galerucini
- Genus: Metalepta; Baly, 1861

= Metalepta =

Genus of leaf beetles

Metalepta is a genus of beetles belonging to the family Chrysomelidae.

== Species ==
- Metalepta degandii
- Metalepta lojaensis
- Metalepta patricia
- Metalepta perezi
- Metalepta rubra
- Metalepta tuberculata Baly, 1861
