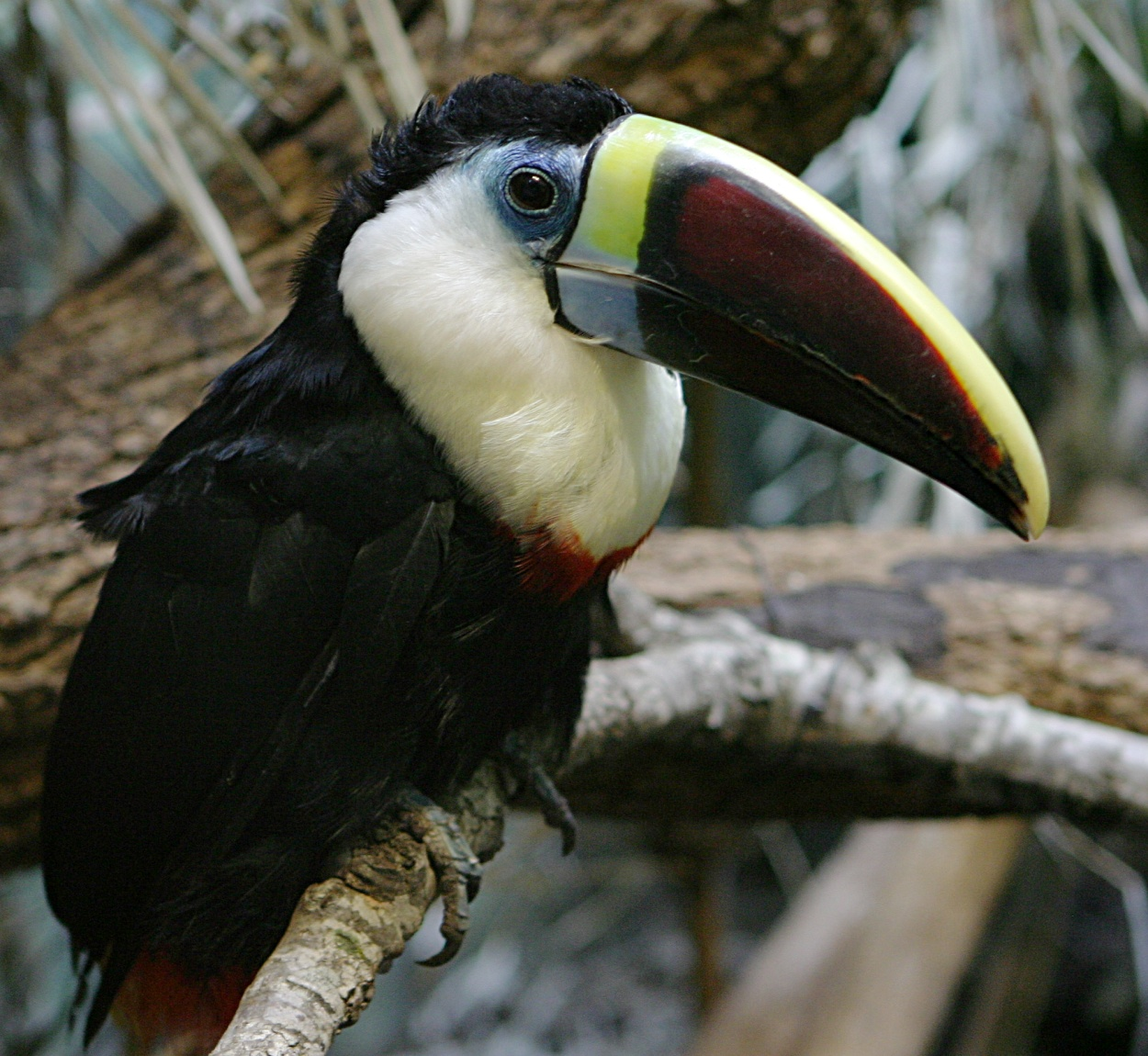
- Ramphastos t. tucanus at Tropical Birdland, Leicestershire

Conservation status
- Least Concern (IUCN 3.1) species assessment

- Least Concern (IUCN 3.1) subspecies R. t. cuvieri assessment

Scientific classification
- Kingdom: Animalia
- Phylum: Chordata
- Class: Aves
- Order: Piciformes
- Family: Ramphastidae
- Genus: Ramphastos
- Species: R. tucanus

Binomial name
- Ramphastos tucanus Linnaeus, 1758

Subspecies
- See text

= White-throated toucan =

Species of bird

A recording at an aviary

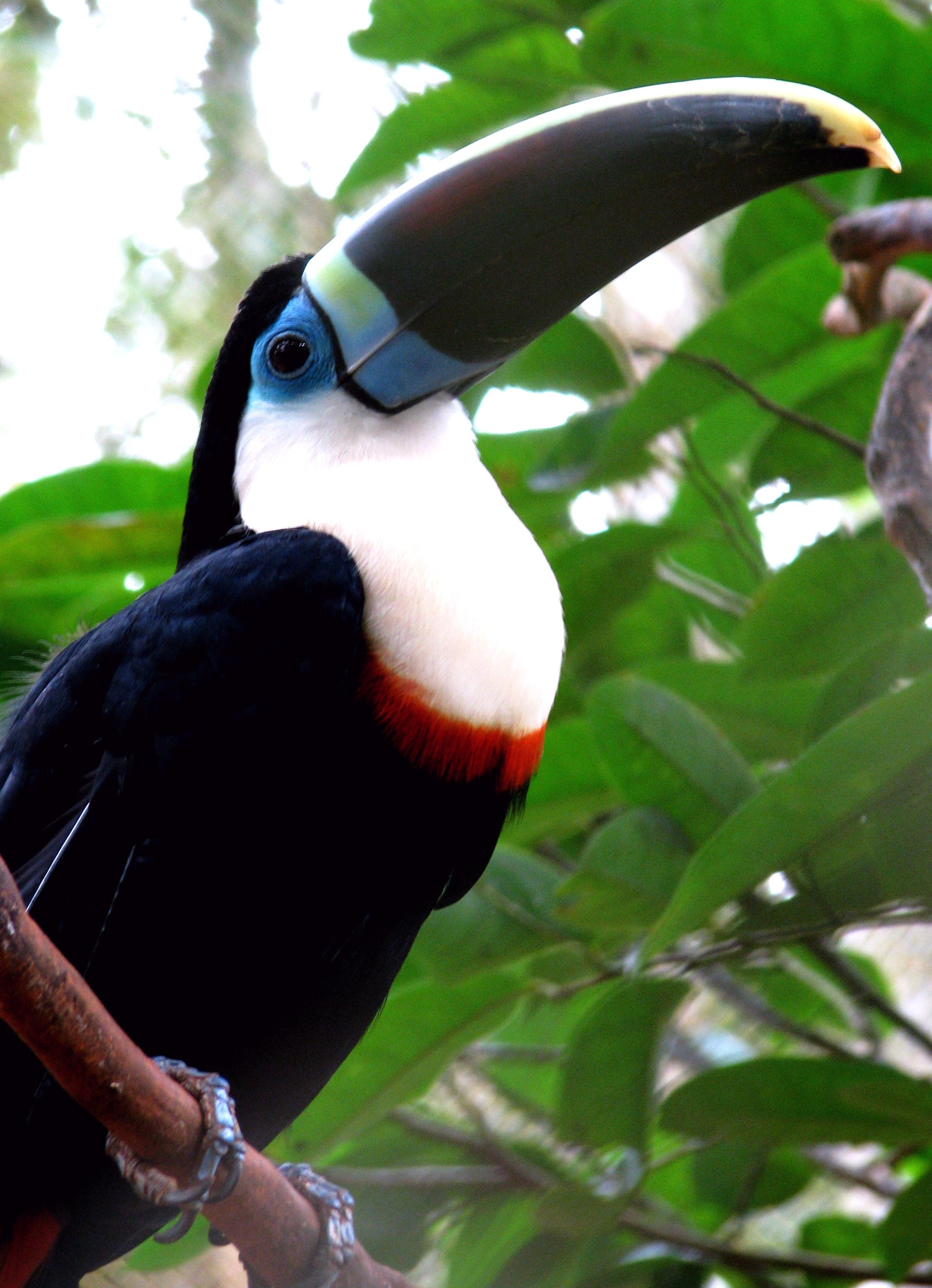
At first this may resemble a Cuvier's toucan, R. t. cuvieri, but a closer look reveals a brownish patch on the upper part of the mandible, identifying it as a tucanus-cuvieri intergrade.

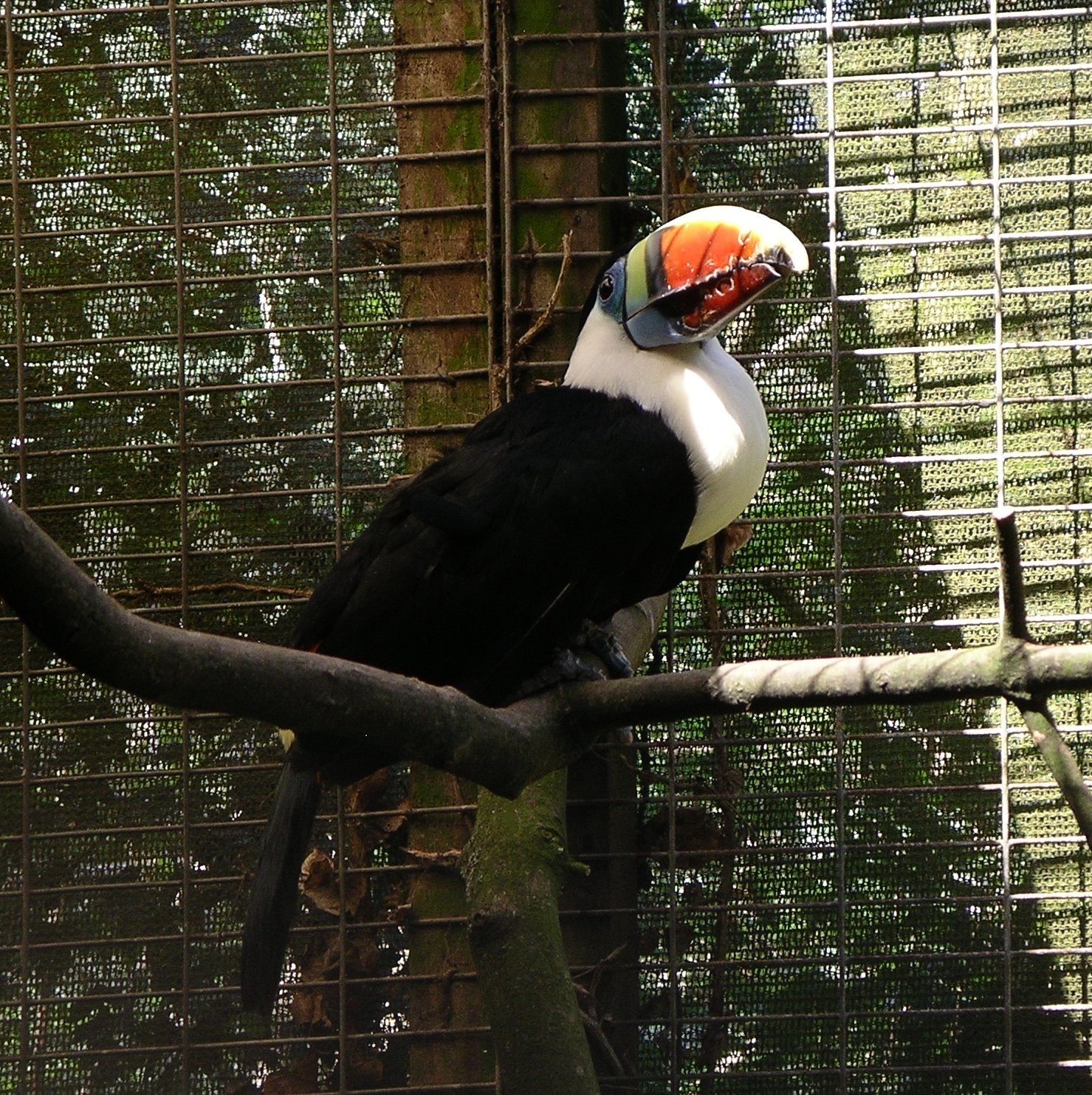
Ramphastos t. tucanus

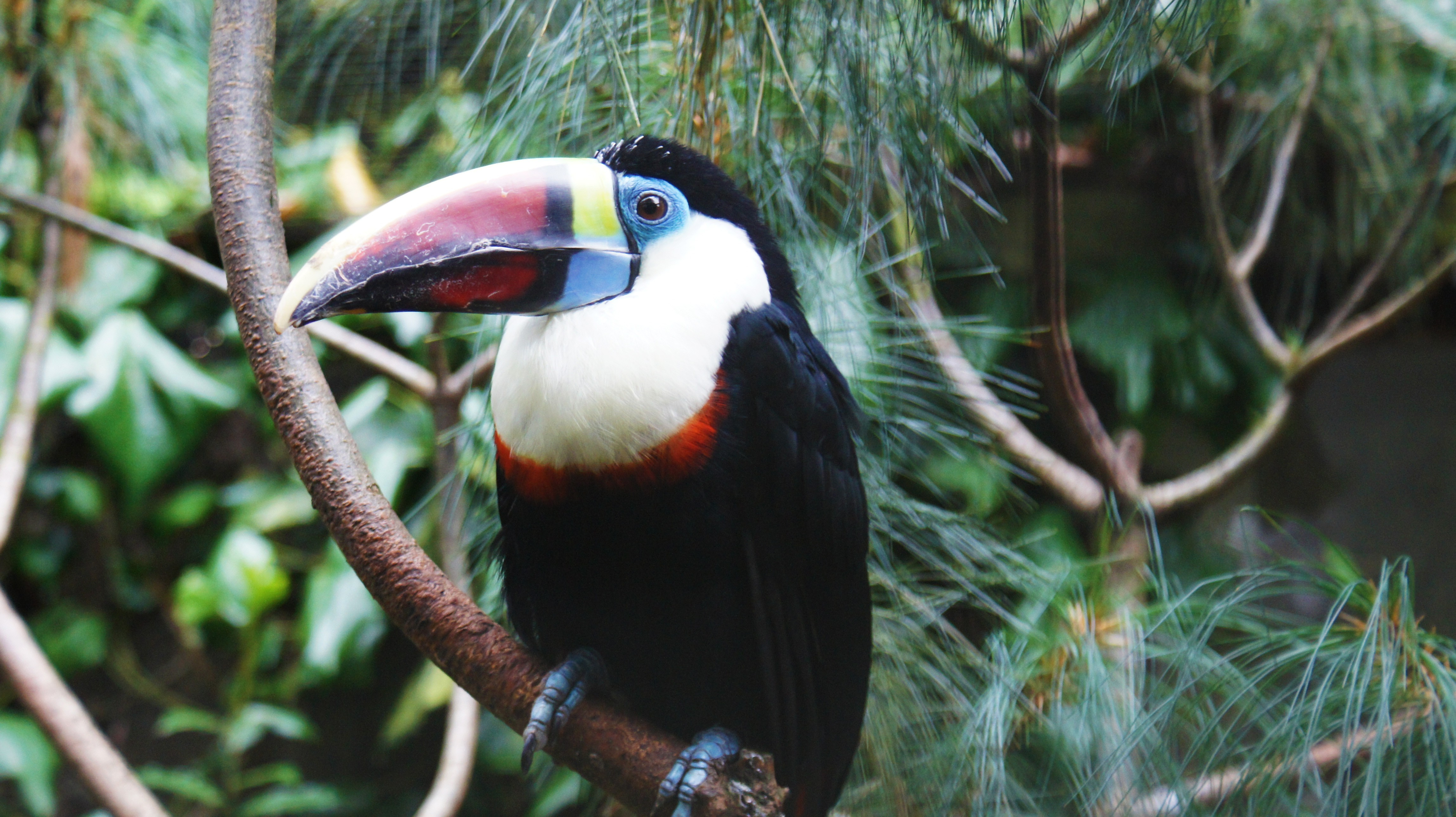
In captivity

The white-throated toucan (Ramphastos tucanus) is a bird in the family Ramphastidae found in South America throughout the Amazon Basin including the adjacent Tocantins and Araguaia River drainage. It prefers tropical humid forest, but also occurs in woodland and locally in riverine forest within cerrado.

== Taxonomy ==
The white-throated toucan was formally described by the Swedish naturalist Carl Linnaeus in 1758 in the tenth edition of his Systema Naturae. He placed it with the other toucans in the genus Ramphastos and coined the binomial name Ramphastos tucanus. Linnaeus specified the "habitat" as South America. The type locality was restricted to Suriname by the American ornithologists Ludlow Griscom and James Greenway in 1937. The genus name is from Ancient Greek ῥαμφηστης/rhamphēstēs meaning "snouted" (from ῥαμφη/rhampē meaning "bill"). The specific epithet tucanus is from the Guarani language and may mean "bonenose".

=== Subspecies ===
Three subspecies are recognized by the International Ornithological Committee (IOC), the South American Classification Committee of the American Ornithological Society, and the Clements taxonomy:

Image	Subspecies	Distribution
	"Red-billed toucan" (R. t. tucanus) Linnaeus, 1758	south-eastern Venezuela, the Guianas and northern Brazil
	"Cuvier's toucan" (R. t. cuvieri) Wagler, 1827 – originally described as a separate species	Upper Amazonia from western Venezuela to northern Bolivia
	"Inca toucan" (R. t. inca) Gould, 1846 – originally described as a separate species	Northern and central Bolivia

BirdLife International's Handbook of the Birds of the World (HBW) treats the red-billed toucan as a species R. tucanus and the other two taxa as subspecies of "Cuvier's toucan" R. cuvieri. All three taxa were formerly considered to be three separate species. The red-billed toucan and Cuvier's toucan, which differ principally in the bill colour, interbreed freely wherever they meet and therefore now merit only subspecies status. Some authorities consider the Inca toucan to represent a stable hybrid population between the other two subspecies and do not recognize it as a separate subspecies, but actually the two red(dish)-billed taxa are separated by the black-billed R.t.cuvieri, while Inca toucans only occur in the Andes foothill valleys at the extreme southwest of the range, where founder effects can easily result in fixation of otherwise rare alleles.

A 2023 phylogenetic analysis sampling two each of the Red-billed and Cuvier's toucans found them to form a tight-knit group with incomplete lineage sorting, indicating a fairly new and ongoing radiation with recent gene flow between the subspecies, in line with the wide zone of intergrading phenotypes across Amazonia. No Inca toucans were sampled; this taxon is little-studied in general. The white-throated toucans are closest to the yellow-throated toucan (R.ambiguus); together they form a fairly ancient lineage of the typical toucans, which probably expanded northwestwards out of southern Amazonia and into Central America. They are distinguished from most of their relatives by generally dark bills with a yellow keel and tip. Such a pattern is otherwise only found in the Choco toucan (R.brevis) and the channel-billed toucan (R.vitellinus), which strongly resemble white- and yellow-throated toucans in overall coloration, but are distinctly smaller than these, give croaking instead of yelping calls, and probably belong to the more advanced radiation of the genus.

== Description ==
Like other toucans, the white-throated red billed toucan is brightly marked and has a huge maroon bill. It has a total length of 50–61 cm (19.5–24 in). Body weight is somewhat variable, ranging in adult birds from 425 to 830 g (0.937 to 1.830 lb). The male averages slightly larger, at a mass of 642 g (1.415 lb), while the female averages 580 g (1.28 lb). However, the subspecies R. t. cuvieri is larger, with males averaging 702 g (1.548 lb) and females averaging 687 g (1.515 lb). Among standard measurements, the wing chord is 20.4 to 26.5 cm (8.0 to 10.4 in), the bill is 12.2 to 22 cm (4.8 to 8.7 in), the tail is 13.3 to 16.8 cm (5.2 to 6.6 in), and the tarsus is 4.5 to 5.6 cm (1.8 to 2.2 in). The only species of toucan that surpasses the white-throated in size is the toco toucan, however the R. t. cuvieri subspecies of white-throated red billed toucan appears to perhaps be even heavier than the Toco species.

It has black plumage with a white throat and breast bordered below with a narrow red line. The rump is bright yellow and the crissum (the area around the cloaca) is red. The bare skin around the eye is blue. The bill has a yellow tip, upper ridge and base of the upper mandible, and the base of the lower mandible is blue. The rest of the bill is mainly black in R. t. cuvieri and mainly reddish-brown in R. t. tucanus, with intergrades showing a mixed coloration. Males are larger and longer-billed than females, but otherwise the sexes are alike.

Juveniles are noticeably shorter-billed, more sooty-black, and have duller plumage.

The white-throated red billed toucan of the race cuvieri is virtually identical to the related channel-billed toucan of the race culminatus, but the latter is smaller and has a proportionally shorter bill with a more strongly keeled culmen. The call is often the best distinction between the species. White-throated red billed toucan has a yelping eeoo, hue hue, it has one of the loudest calling among the rest of the toucan whereas channel-billed has a croaking song.

== Behaviour ==
Small flocks or more commonly pairs of birds move through the forest with a heavy, rather weak, undulating flight, rarely flying more than 100 m (330 ft) at a time. This species is primarily an arboreal fruit-eater, but will also take insects, lizards, eggs, and small birds.

== Breeding ==
The 2–6 white eggs are laid in an unlined cavity high in a decayed section of a living tree, or in an old woodpecker nest in a dead tree.

Both sexes incubate the eggs for at 11–14 days, and the toucan chicks remain in the nest after hatching. They are blind and naked at birth, with short bills, and have specialised pads on their heels to protect them from the rough floor of the nest. They are fed by both parents, and fledge after about 6 weeks. The parents continue feeding the juveniles for several weeks after they have left the nest.

== Aviculture ==
White-throated toucans (specifically the red billed subspecies) are sometimes kept as pets. However, like the chestnut-mandibled toucan they are considered to be noisy, when compared to other frequently kept toucans such as the keel-billed toucan and toco toucan. It is illegal to take toucans or any other protected wild bird species from their natural habitat.

== Status ==
The IUCN follows HBW taxonomy, and so has assessed the "red-billed" and "Cuvier's" toucans separately. The "red-billed" was for a time treated as Vulnerable, but since 2021 has been treated as being of Least Concern. However, "The primary threat to this species is accelerating deforestation in the Amazon basin" and "is also suffering from hunting pressure and from trapping for the pet trade". In contrast, "Cuvier's" has always been assessed as being of Least Concern, and no immediate threats have been identified.

The white-throated toucan is listed in CITES Appendix II.

== Bibliography ==
- Bibliography of online, ornithological articles which explore the natural history of the Red-billed toucan, Ramphastos tucanus tucanus and Cuvier's toucan, Ramphastos tucanus cuvieri.
- John Gould and Henry Constantine Richter, A Monography of the Ramphastidae, or Family of Toucans, London 1854
- ** newly edited with 51 coloured prints and a preface by Jonathan Elphick: Taschen, Köln, Germany 2011 ISBN 978-3-8365-0524-6
