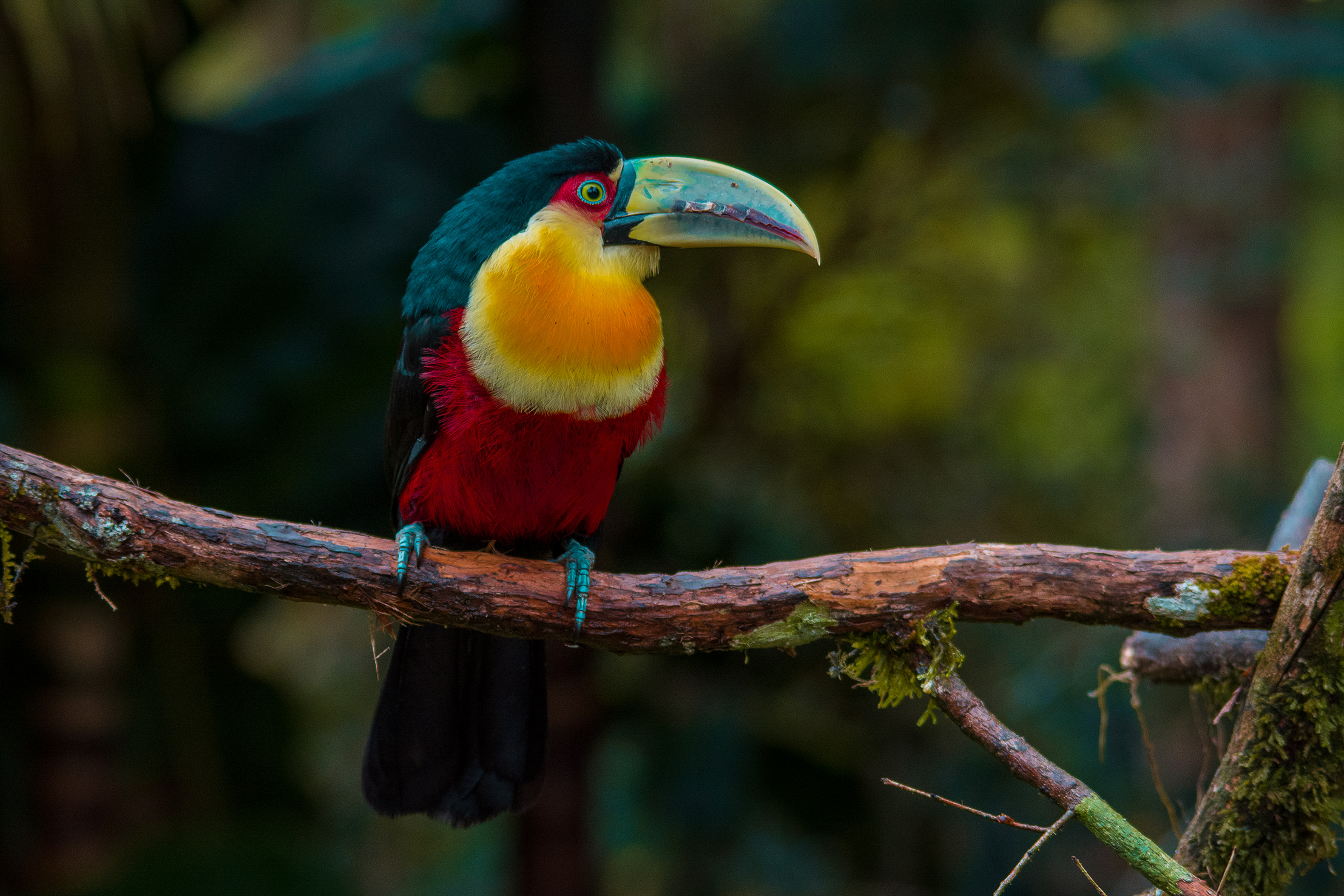
- In Parque das Aves, Brazil

Conservation status
- Least Concern (IUCN 3.1)

Scientific classification
- Kingdom: Animalia
- Phylum: Chordata
- Class: Aves
- Order: Piciformes
- Family: Ramphastidae
- Genus: Ramphastos
- Species: R. dicolorus

Binomial name
- Ramphastos dicolorus Linnaeus, 1766

Synonyms
- Rhamphastos dicolorus

= Red-breasted toucan =

Species of bird

The red-breasted toucan or green-billed toucan (Ramphastos dicolorus) is a bird in the family Ramphastidae, the toucans, toucanets, and aracaris. It is found in Argentina, Brazil and Paraguay.

== Taxonomy and systematics ==
The red-breasted toucan is sister to the channel-billed toucan (R. vitellinus) and Choco toucan (R. brevis). It is monotypic.

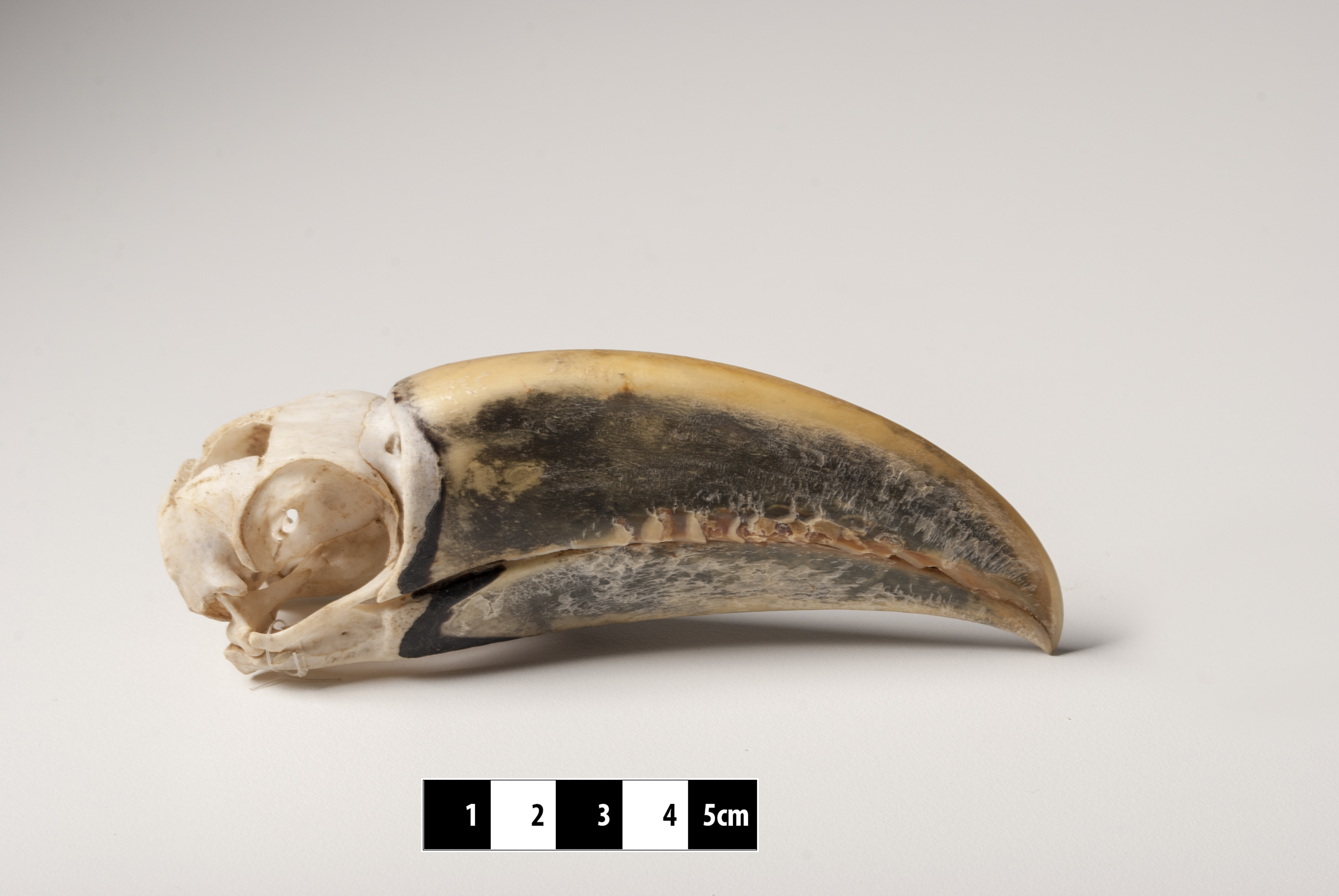
Skull of a red-breasted toucan

== Description ==
The red-breasted toucan is 42 to 48 cm (17 to 19 in) long and weighs 265 to 400 g (9.3 to 14 oz); it is the smallest member of genus Ramphastos. The sexes are alike though the female's bill is shorter than the male's. Their bill is mostly green to green-yellow, with a vertical black line at its base, red and ivory tomial "teeth", and some green striations on the maxilla. Their crown, nape, upperparts, and tail are black but for red uppertail coverts. Their face is yellow with bare red, blue, and yellow-green skin around the eye. Their throat and breast are yellow with a red area within the lower breast. Their belly and undertail coverts are red and their flanks black.

== Distribution and habitat ==
The red-breasted toucan is found from Tocantins, Minas Gerais, and Espírito Santo in south-central, east-central, and southeastern Brazil south through eastern Paraguay, Bolivia and into northern Argentina's Formosa, Chaco, Corrientes, and Misiones provinces. It primarily inhabits subtropical and tropical, sub-montane and montane forest, but also scrublands, savanna with trees, and plantations. In elevation it mostly ranges between 100 and 1,500 m (300 and 4,900 ft); it occurs as high as 2,070 m (6,800 ft) but only rarely.

== Behavior ==
=== Movement ===
In the southern part of its range the red-breasted toucan moves to lower elevations in the austral winter. After breeding some move from natural forest into plantations.

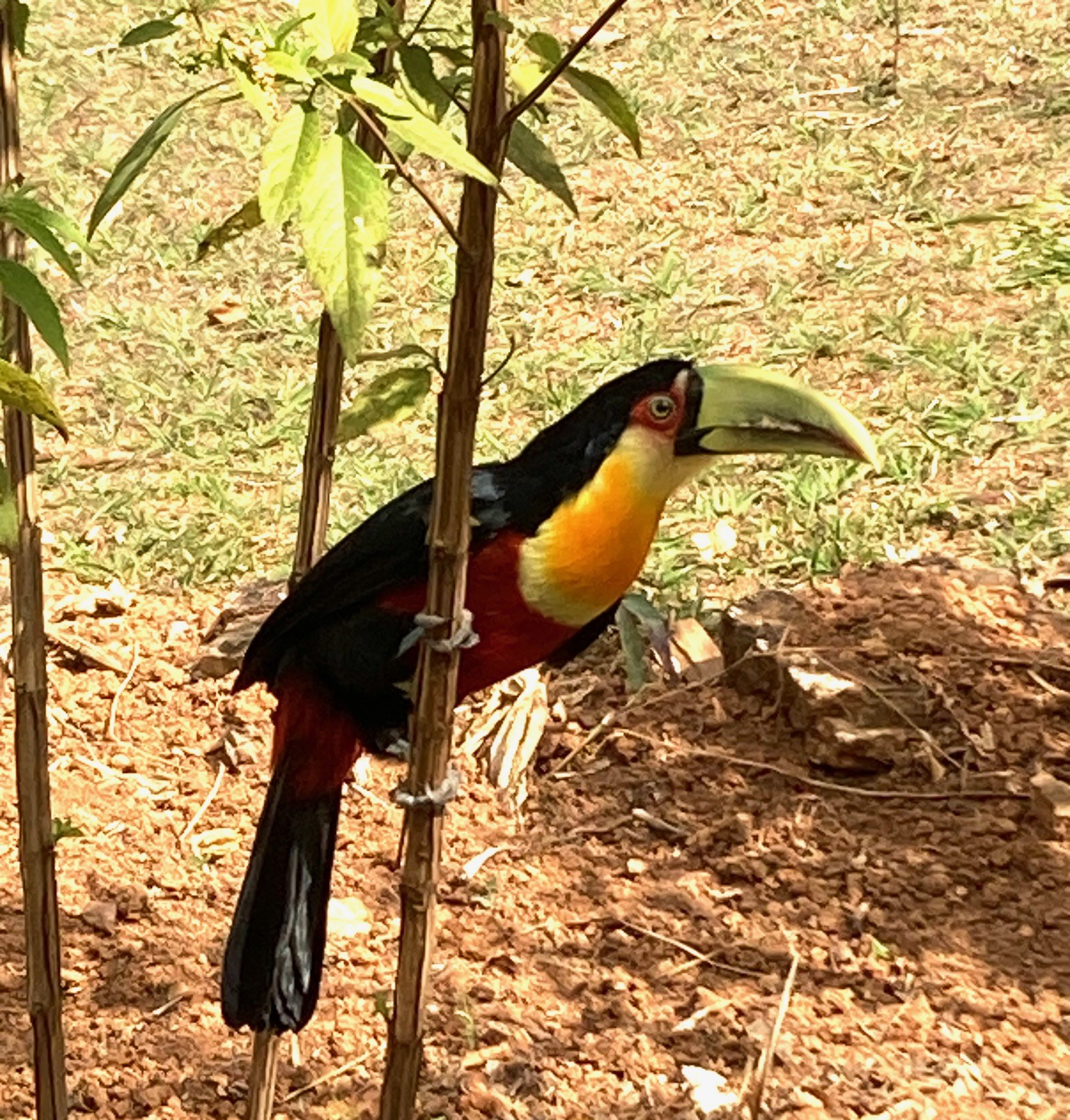

=== Feeding ===
The red-breasted toucan feeds mostly on fruits, of both native and introduced plants as well as green coffee beans and fruit in orchards. To a lesser extent it also feeds on insects and small birds. It usually forages in pairs and small groups but 20 or more may gather at times. It usually forages in the forest canopy but will pick up fallen fruit from the ground.

=== Breeding ===
The red-breasted toucan breeds between October and February in the southern part of its range and from January to June in the north. Pairs are territorial. Males allopreen and courtship-feed females. The species nests in cavities in both living and dead trees, either those made by natural decay or excavated by woodpeckers, and will enlarge both the entrance hole and the cavity if needed. Typically the bottom of the cavity has a layer of ejested seeds. The few nests studied have ranged from 0.7 to 6.0 m (2 to 20 ft) above the ground. The clutch size is two to four eggs. Both adults incubate the eggs and both provision nestlings. The incubation period is about 16 to 19 days and fledging occurs 40 to 50 days after hatch.

=== Vocal and non-vocal sounds ===
The red-breasted toucan is one of the "croaker" group of toucans. Its song is a "loud, raucous 'WRèh' or 'niuh'." Other vocalizations are a "long series of noisy honking 'grrekk' notes" and "low 'ek', 'zneep', [and] growl-like begging". It also claps its bill and rattles its tongue in the bill.

== Status ==
The IUCN originally assessed the red-breasted toucan as Near Threatened but since 2004 has rated it as being of Least Concern. It has a very large range, but its population size is not known and is believed to be decreasing. No immediate threats have been identified. It is thought to be "reasonably common in general." It occurs in several protected areas but outside them is sometimes hunted or persecuted for taking orchard fruit.
