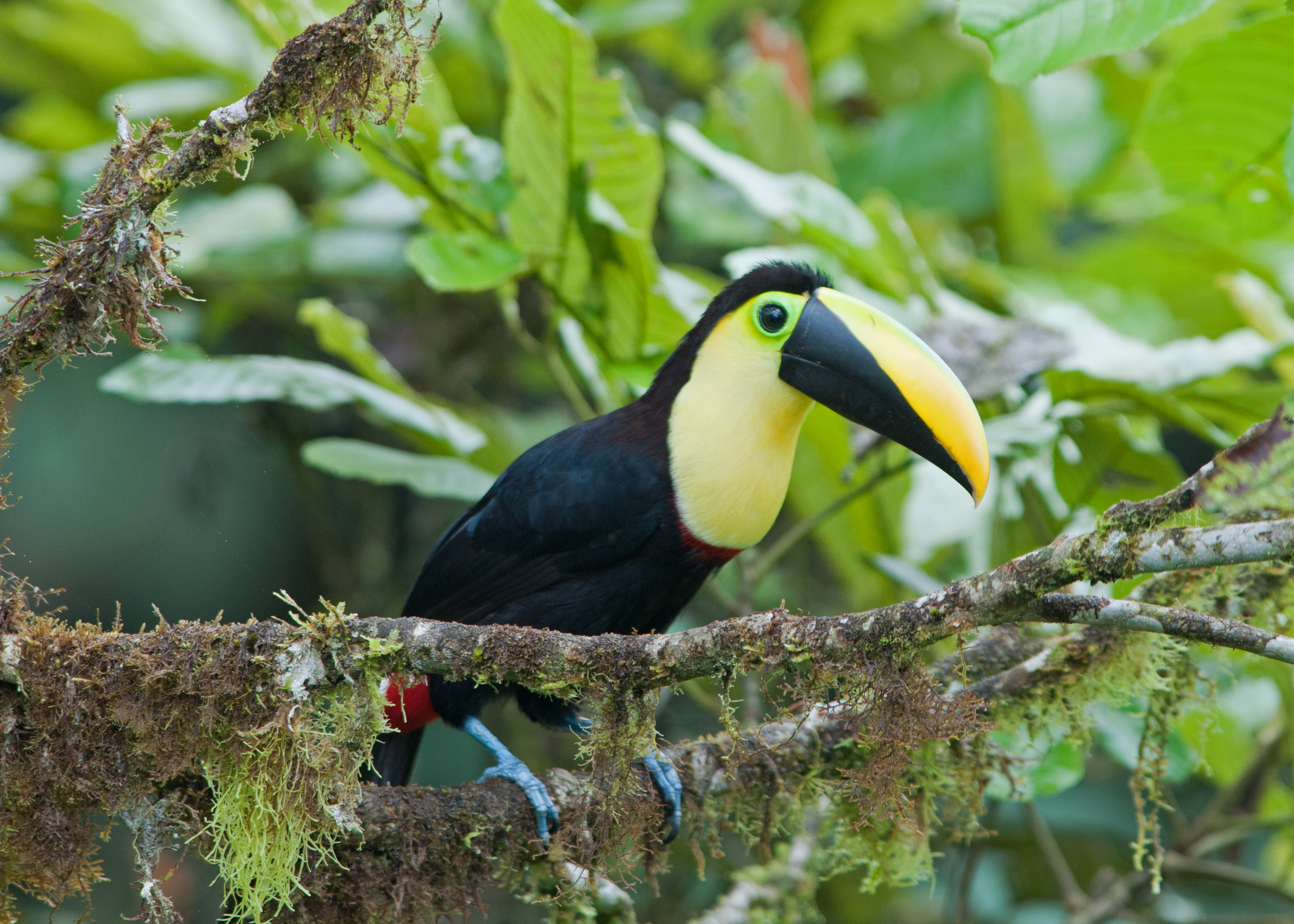
- Choco toucan

Scientific classification
- Kingdom: Animalia
- Phylum: Chordata
- Class: Aves
- Order: Piciformes
- Family: Ramphastidae
- Genus: Ramphastos; Linnaeus, 1758

Type species
- Ramphastos tucanus Linnaeus, 1758

Species
- See text.

Synonyms
- Rhamphastos

= Ramphastos =

Genus of birds

The Ramphastos genus, also known as true toucans, is a genus of brightly colored, tropical birds that are found throughout Central and South America from Southern Mexico to the southern cone of the South American continent. Toucans are typically characterized by their large, colorful bills, which are used for a variety of functions such as thermoregulation, feeding, and social signaling.

== Taxonomy ==
The genus Ramphastos was introduced in 1758 by the Swedish naturalist Carl Linnaeus in the tenth edition of his Systema Naturae. The name is from Ancient Greek ῥαμφηστης/rhamphēstēs meaning "snouted" (from ῥαμφη/rhampē meaning "bill"). The type species was later designated by Nicholas Aylward Vigors as the white-throated toucan (Ramphastos tucanus).

The phylogenetic tree below shows the relationships among the Ramphastidae, according to a 2023 study by Emily Ostrow and collaborators. (Note: Selenidera appears twice because the relationship between this genus and Andigena differs between analyses of ultraconserved elements (UCEs) and mitochondrial DNA sequence data. UCE analysis shows Selenidera spectabilis as sister to the rest of Selenidera and Andigena, while mitochondrial analysis indicates S. spectabilis and S. piperivora as sister to Andigena, with this clade as sister to the rest of Selenidera.)

- Ramphastidae
  - - Pteroglossus
    - - Aulacorhynchus
      - - - Selenidera
          - Andigena
        - Selenidera
  - Ramphastos

The phylogenetic relationships among toucans have been the subject of ongoing debate and research; in the past, the eight toucan species were classified into different subfamilies based on their bill size and shape. However, recent molecular studies have suggested that toucans are more closely related to aracaris and toucanets than previously thought. Several species have also been removed from the Ramphastos genus: Green aracari, Ivory-billed aracari, Black-necked aracari, Collared aracari, Saffron toucanet.

One such study published in the journal Molecular Phylogenetics and Evolution in 2015, used molecular data to investigate the phylogenetic relationships among toucans. The researchers sequenced several nuclear and mitochondrial genes from 40 toucan species, representing all recognized subgenera within the genus Ramphastos. The study found that toucans could be divided into six distinct clades, each with different bill morphologies and geographic distributions. The study also suggested that the toucan genus had diversified during the Pliocene epoch, around 5 million years ago, with the rapid diversification of several lineages during the Pleistocene epoch, around 1 million years ago.

The Ramphastos genus is divided into two groups which differ in the shape of their bills and their vocalization patterns. These two groups are known colloquially as the “croakers'' and the “yelpers”. The “croakers'' contain the following: R. brevis, R. dicolorus, R. sulfuratus, R. toco, and R. vitellinus. The “yelper” group contains: R. ambiguous and R. tucanus. Of these, R. brevis and R. dicolorus are polytypic.

=== History ===
The evolutionary history of toucans can be traced back to the Eocene period, around 50 million years ago, the first toucan-like bird, may have appeared in Europe. The modern toucan species, however, originated in South America during the Miocene period, around 23 million years ago.

=== Transposable Elements ===
Transposable elements are a major source of genetic diversity and can contribute to the evolution of new genes and regulatory elements. Transposable elements have been found in the genomes of all organisms studied so far, including the Ramphastos genus.

One study published in the journal Genome Biology in 2018, used a combination of genomic and phylogenetic analyses to investigate the role of transposable elements in the evolution of toucans. The researchers sequenced the genome of the green-billed toucan (Ramphastos dicolorus) and compared it to the genomes of other bird species. They found that transposable elements were abundant in the toucan genome, making up approximately 19% of the genome.

The researchers also identified several families of transposable elements that were specific to toucans, indicating that these elements had played a role in the evolution of the toucan genome. In particular, the researchers identified a family of elements called CR1, which had undergone a burst of activity in the toucan genome. This burst of activity was associated with the expansion and diversification of several gene families that are involved in sensory perception and immune response.

The study also found that transposable elements had contributed to the evolution of the toucan bill, which is one of the most distinctive features of toucans. The researchers identified several genes involved in the development of the bill that had been influenced by these elements. In particular, they found that they had inserted into regulatory regions of the genes, altering their expression patterns and contributing to the development of the large and colorful bill.

=== Species ===
The genus contains seven species:

| Image | Common name | Scientific name | Distribution |
|---|---|---|---|
| | Toco toucan | Ramphastos toco | |
| | Yellow-throated toucan | Ramphastos ambiguus | |
| | White-throated toucan | Ramphastos tucanus | |
| | Keel-billed toucan | Ramphastos sulfuratus | |
| | Choco toucan | Ramphastos brevis | |
| | Channel-billed toucan | Ramphastos vitellinus | - |
| | Red-breasted toucan | Ramphastos dicolorus | |

=== Former species ===
Some authorities, either presently or formerly, recognize additional species or subspecies as species belonging to the genus Ramphastos including:

- Green aracari (as Ramphastos viridis)
- Ivory-billed aracari (as Ramphastos azara)
- Black-necked aracari (as Ramphastos aracari )
- Black-necked aracari (atricollis) (as Ramphastos atricollis)
- Collared aracari (as Ramphastos torquatus)
- Saffron toucanet (as Ramphastos bailloni)
- Citron-throated toucan is now treated as subspecies of the channel-billed toucan (Ramphastos vitellinus citreolaemus)

== Description ==
This genus comprises the largest toucans, ranging from 42 to 61 centimetres (17 to 24 in) in length. All have black wings, tails and thighs, but the colour of the remaining plumage depends on the exact species involved.

=== Diversity of bills ===
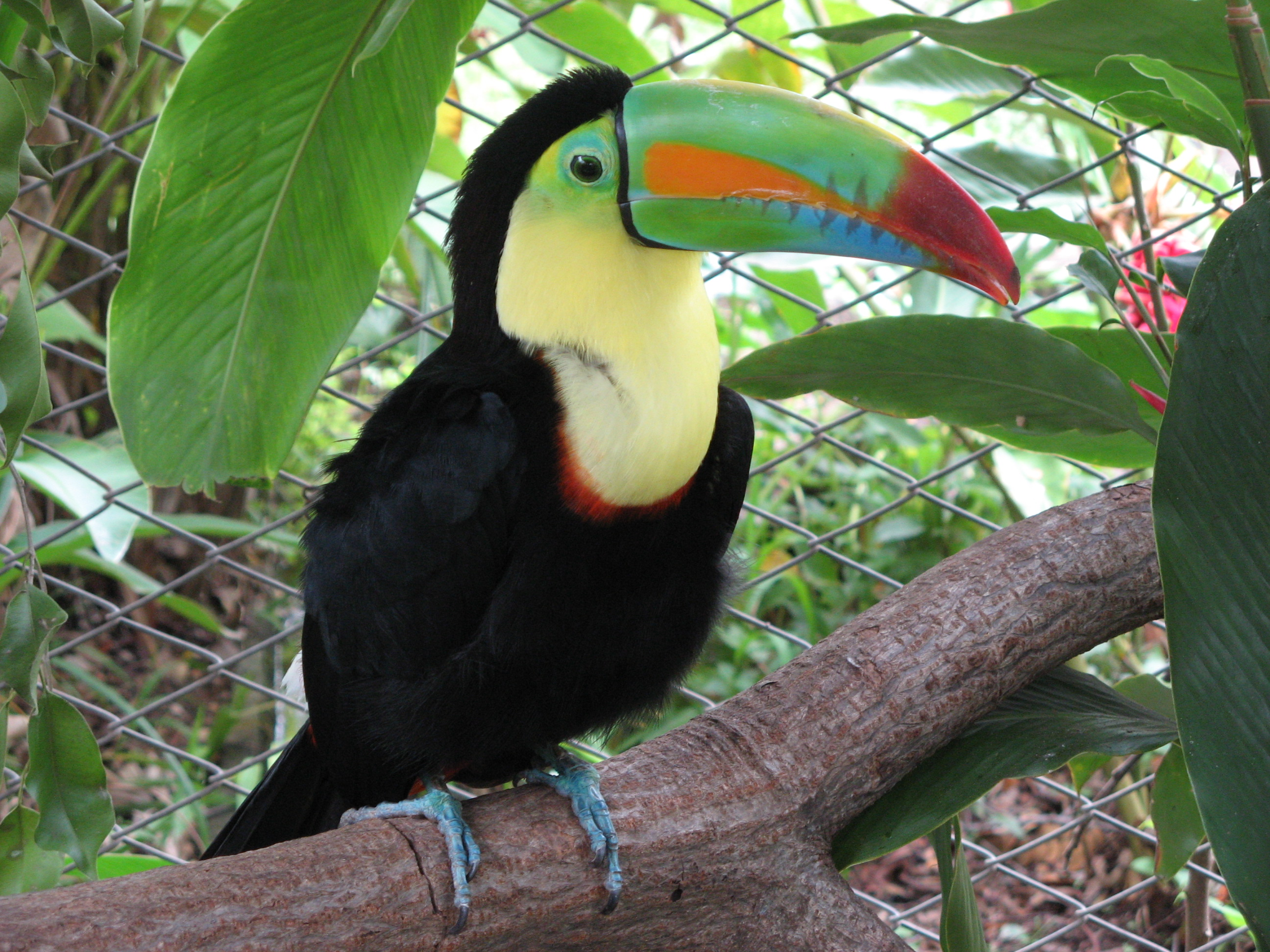
Keel-billed toucan
(Ramphastos sulfuratus)

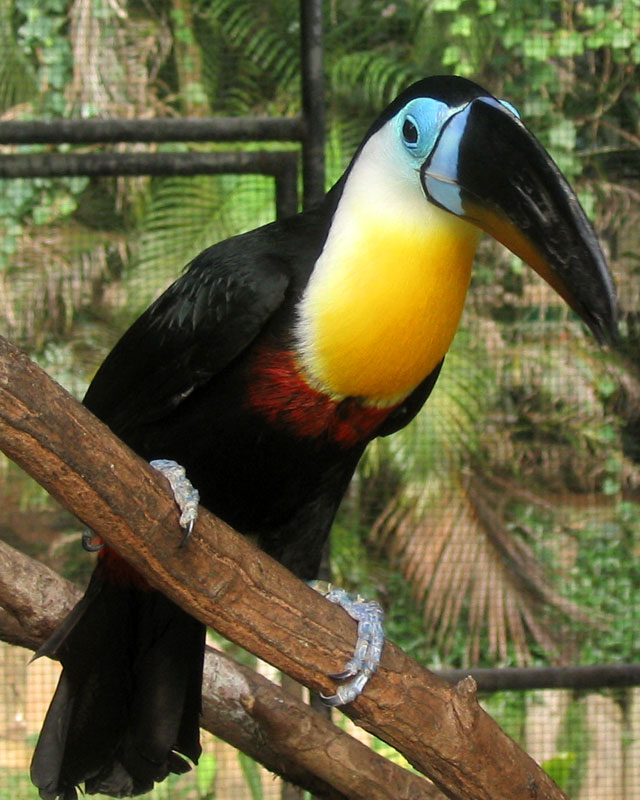
Channel-billed toucan
(Ramphastos vitellinus vitellinus)

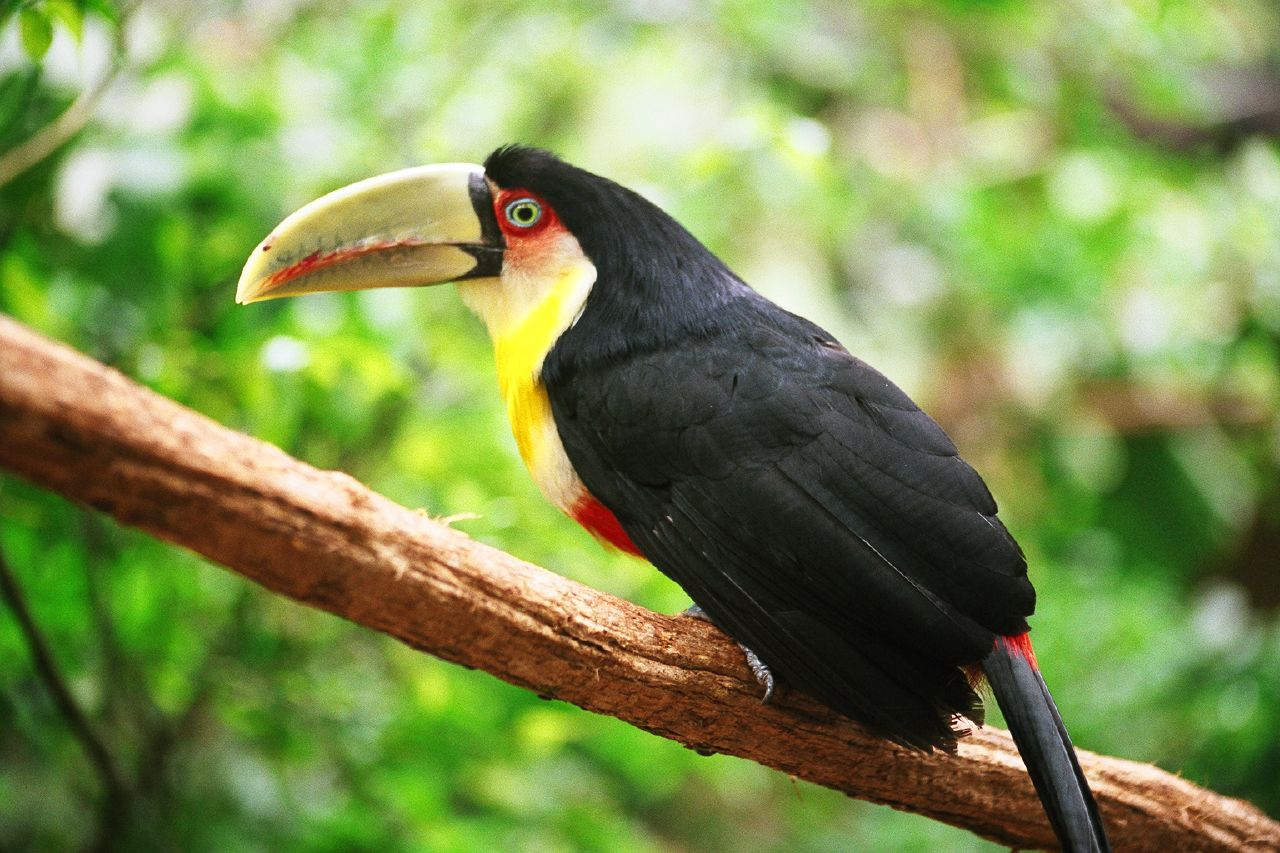
Green-billed toucan (Ramphastos dicolorus)

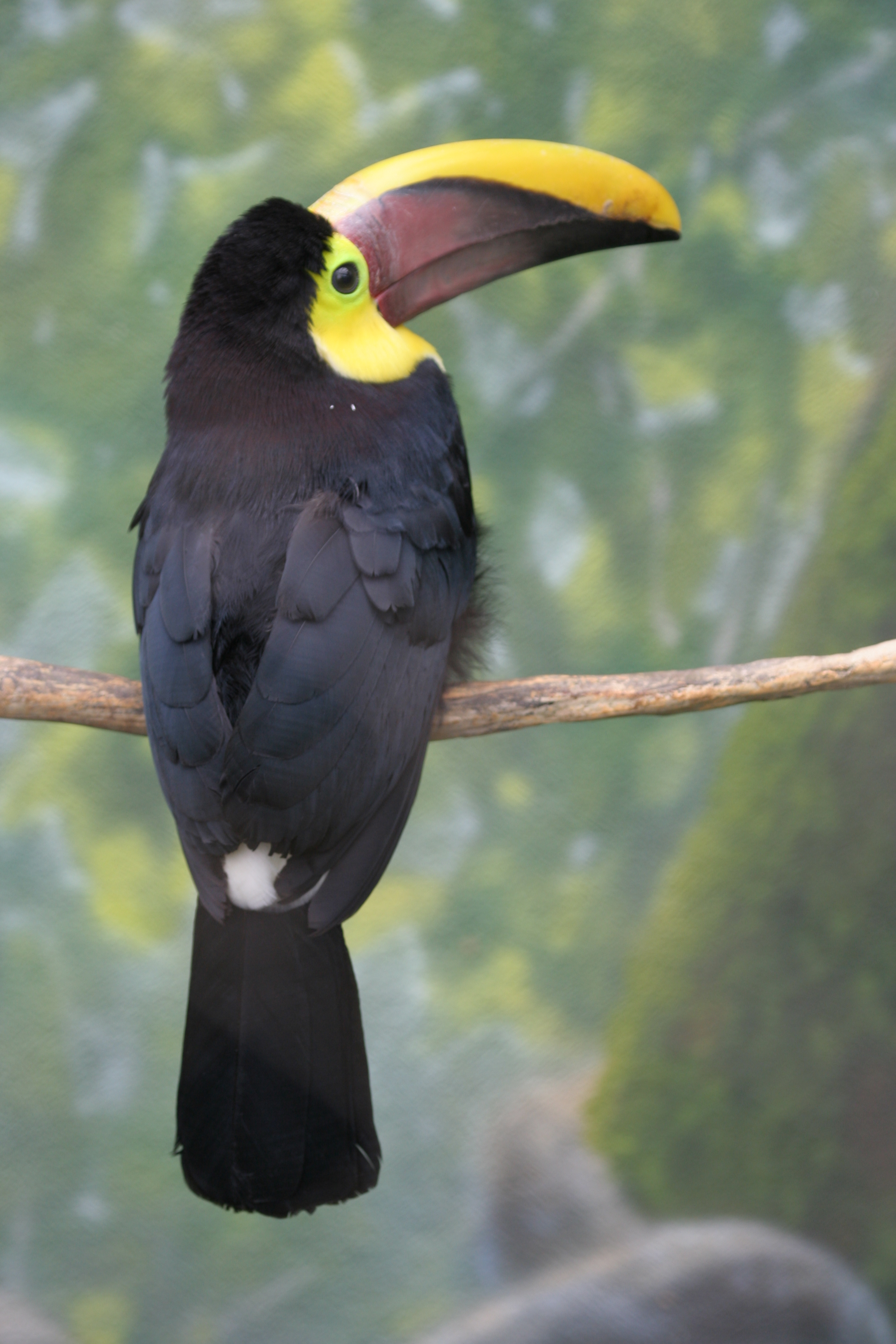
Chestnut-mandibled toucan
(Ramphastos ambiguus swainsonii)

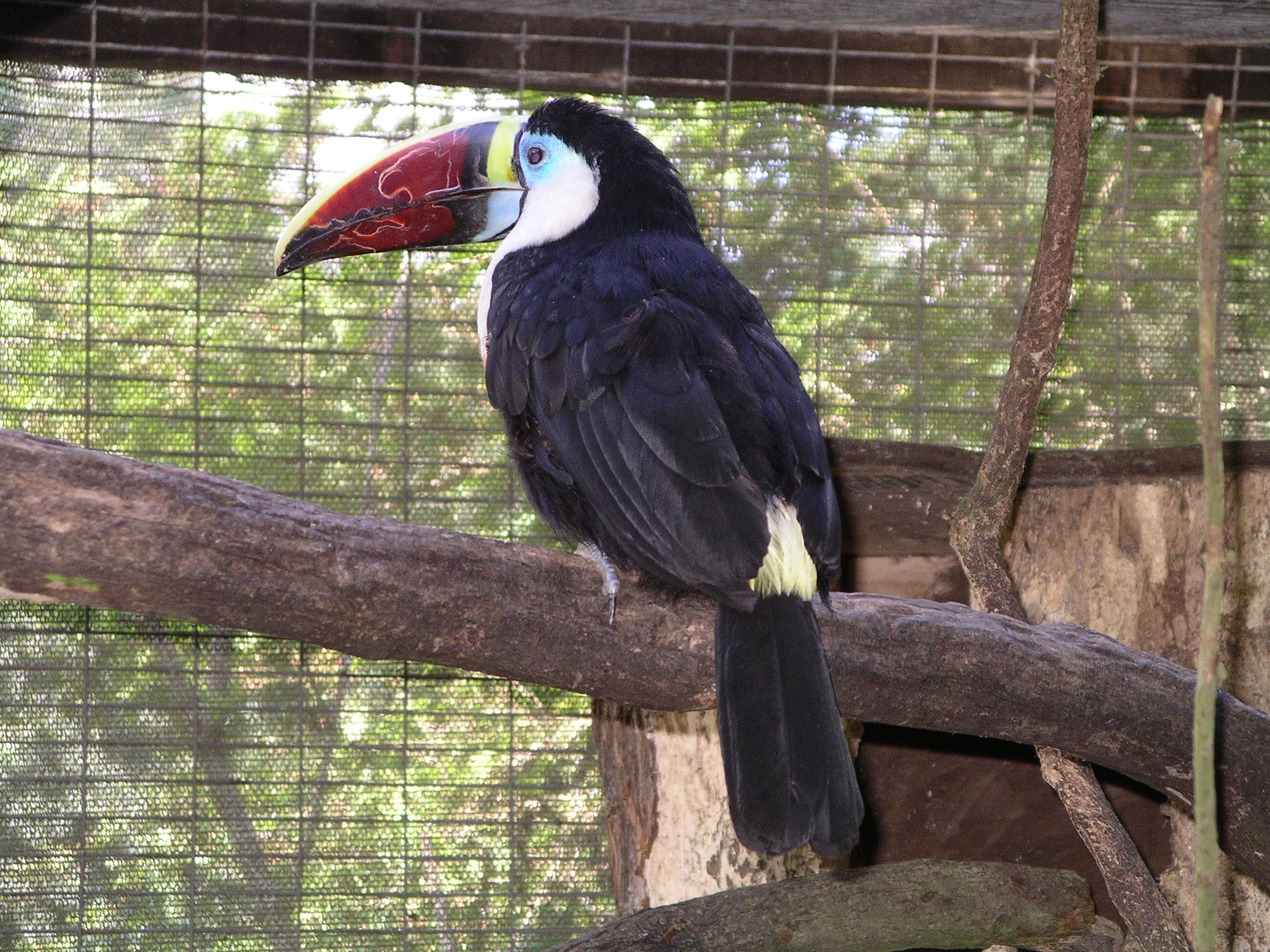
White-throated toucan, (Ramphastos tucanus)

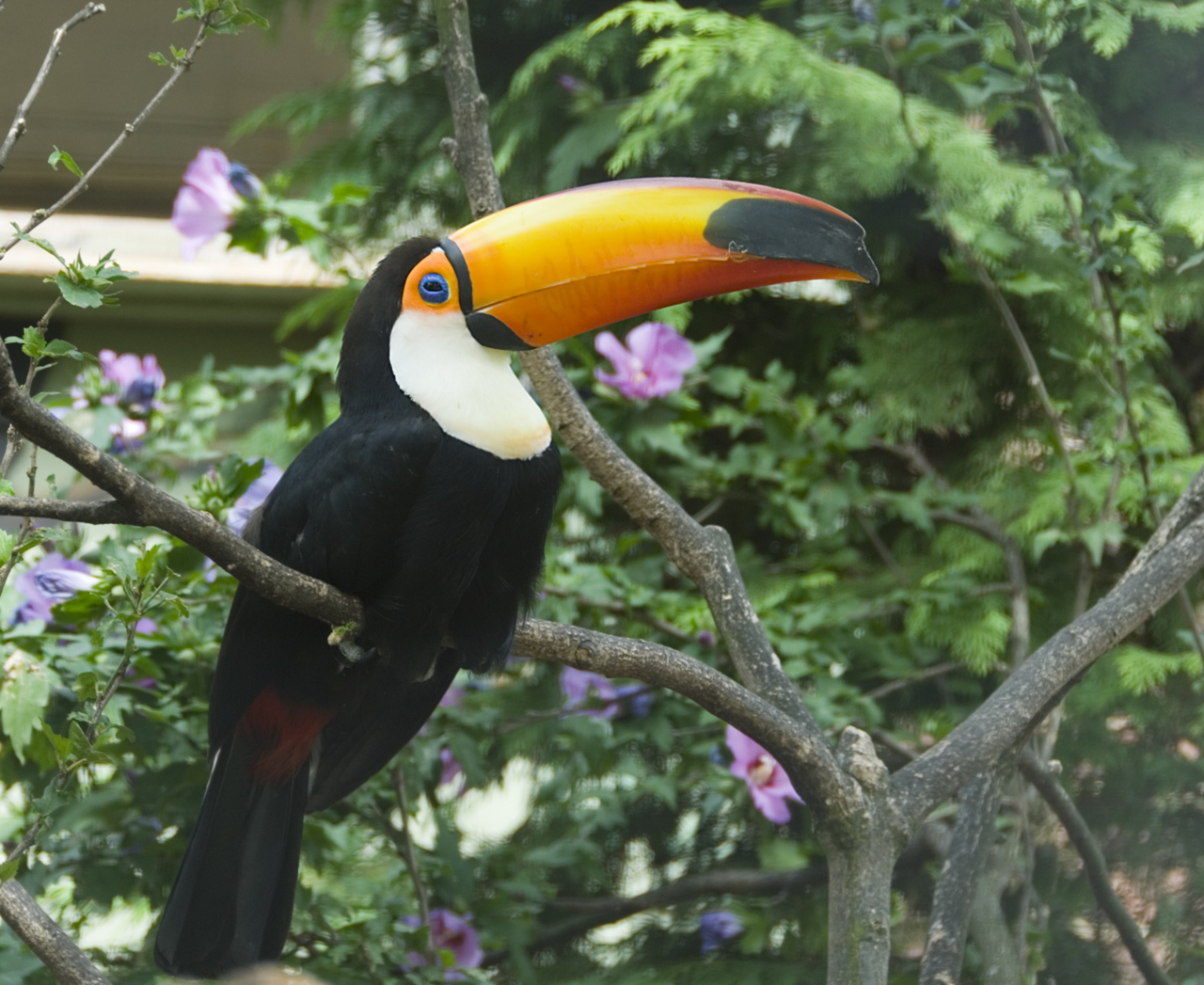
Toco toucan
(Ramphastos toco)

== Distribution and habitat ==
Toucans are found throughout Central and South America, from southern Mexico to northern Argentina. They inhabit a variety of ecosystems, including tropical rainforests, cloud forests, and savannas. Toucans are particularly abundant in the Amazon basin, where they play an important ecological role as seed dispersers and predators.

== Behavior and ecology ==
=== Breeding ===
They are arboreal and nest in tree holes laying 2–4 white eggs.

=== Food and feeding ===
All the species are basically fruit-eating, but will take insects and other small prey.

=== Threats ===
The ischnoceran louse Austrophilopterus cancellosus is suspected to parasitize all species of Ramphastos toucans. Its presence has been confirmed on all species except the citron-throated toucan.
