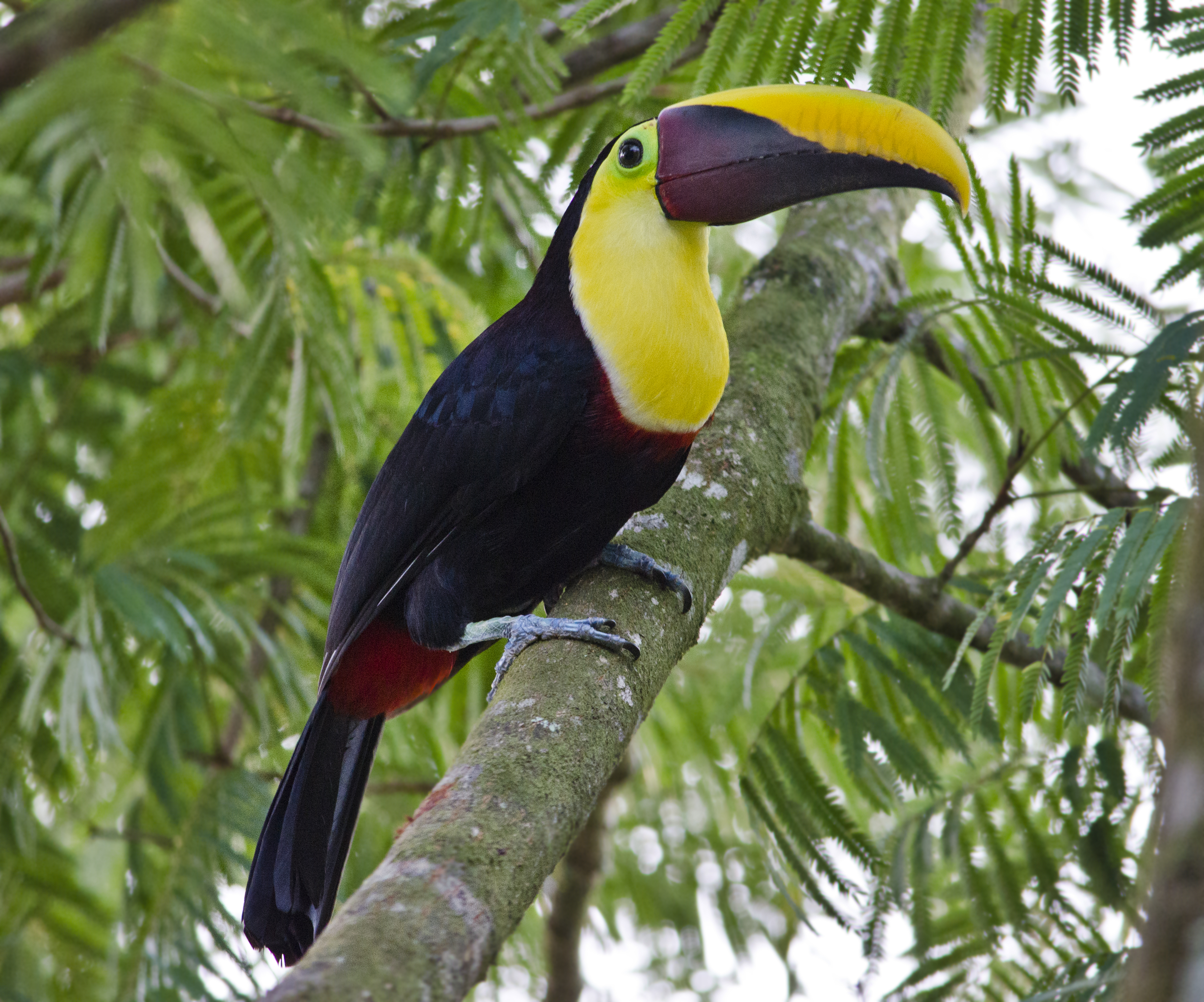
- In Costa Rica.

Scientific classification
- Kingdom: Animalia
- Phylum: Chordata
- Class: Aves
- Order: Piciformes
- Family: Ramphastidae
- Genus: Ramphastos
- Species: R. ambiguus
- Subspecies: R. a. swainsonii

Trinomial name
- Ramphastos ambiguus swainsonii Gould, 1833

Synonyms
- Ramphastos swainsonii

= Chestnut-mandibled toucan =

Subspecies of bird

Subspeciesbox

The chestnut-mandibled toucan or Swainson's toucan (Ramphastos ambiguus swainsonii) is a subspecies of the yellow-throated toucan which breeds from eastern Honduras to northern Colombia to western Ecuador.

== Taxonomy and systematics ==
The scientific and alternative English names commemorate the English ornithologist and artist William Swainson. Since 2009, the chestnut-mandibled toucan has been considered a subspecies of the yellow-throated toucan.

== Description ==
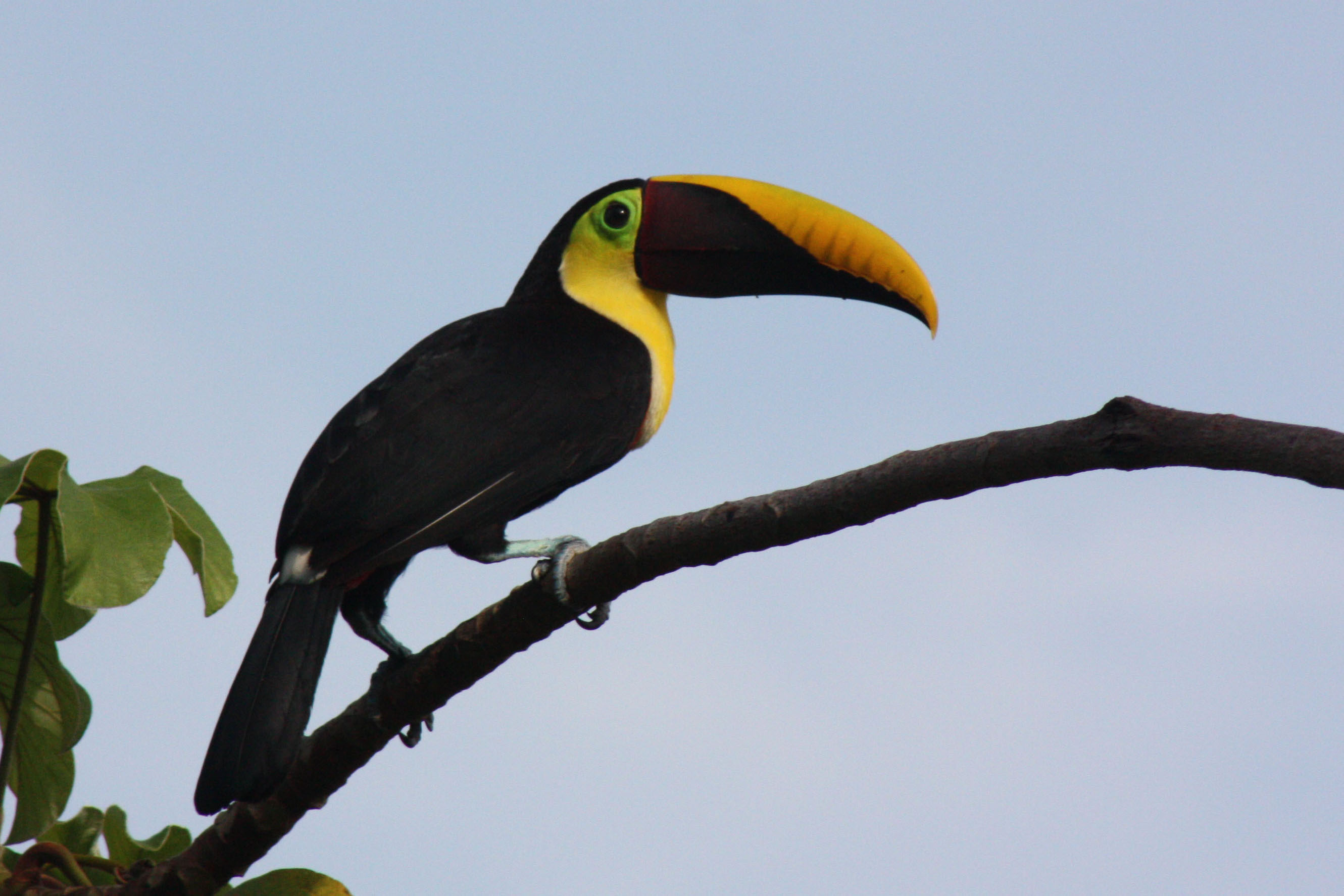
On the Osa Peninsula, Costa Rica

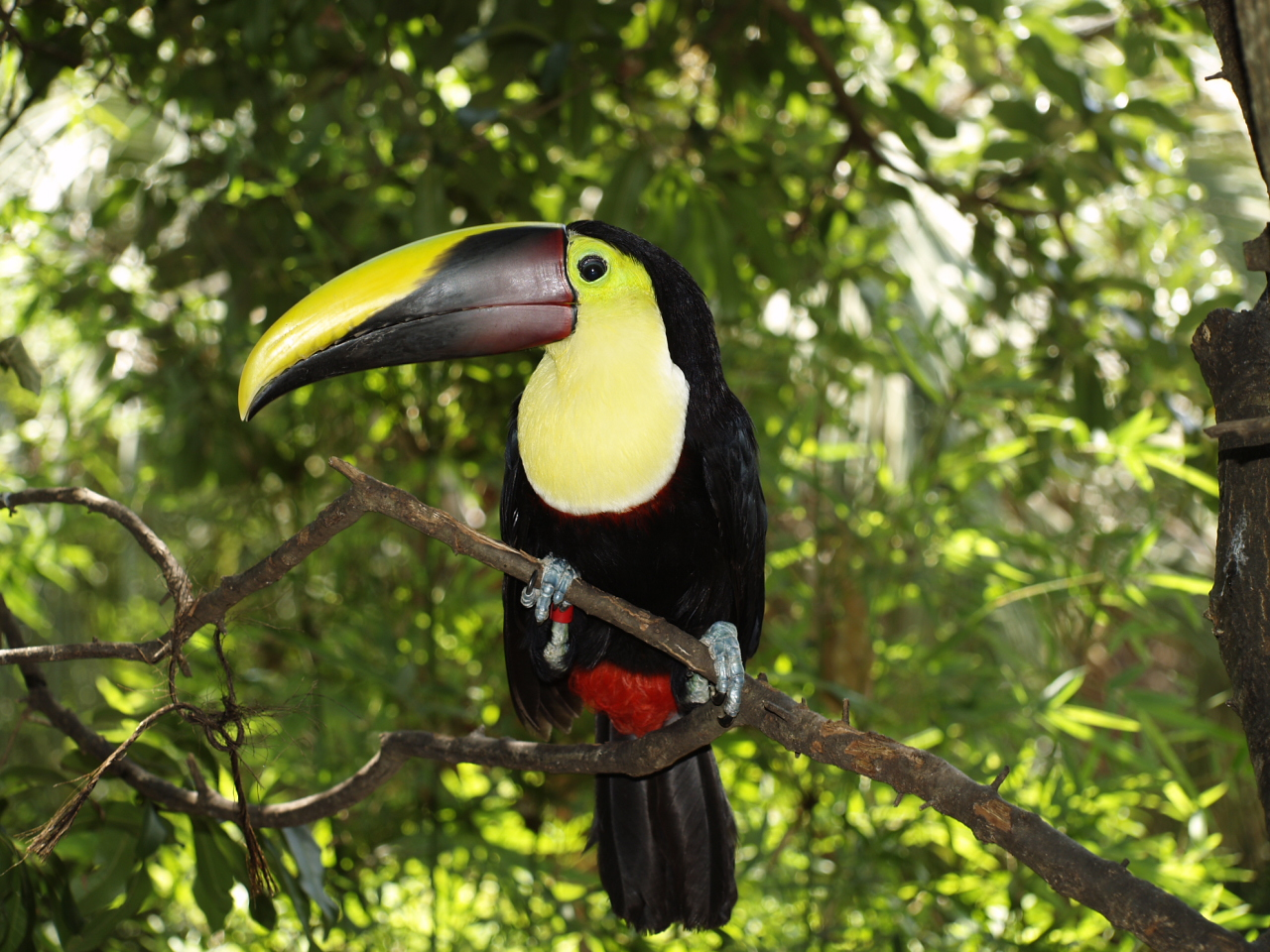
At Jacksonville Zoo

Like other toucans, the chestnut-mandibled is brightly marked and has a large bill. The male is 56 cm long, while the smaller female is typically 52 cm long. Weight ranges from 599 to 746 grams (1.3–1.6 lbs).

The sexes are alike in appearance, mainly black with maroon hints to the head, upper back and lower breast. The face and upper breast are bright yellow, with narrow white and broader red lines forming a lower border. The upper tail is white and the lower abdomen is red. The legs are blue. The body plumage is similar to that of the smaller keel-billed toucan, but the bill pattern is quite different. The chestnut-mandibled toucan's bill is diagonally divided into bright yellow on top and maroon on bottom.

Juvenile birds are sooty-black, and have duller plumage, particularly with respect to the bib, red border, and lower mandible. They are fed by the parents for several weeks after leaving the nest.

The call of the chestnut-mandibled toucan is a yelping yo-YIP, a-yip, a-yip, or a Dios te dé, Dios te dé (Spanish for "God give you..."). It is given to maintain contact as the flock travels in "follow-my-leader" style through the trees, but also in chorus at the evening roosts.

== Behavior ==
Small flocks, usually consisting of 3–12 birds, move through the forest with an undulating flight, rarely travelling more than 100m at a time. This species is primarily an arboreal fruit-eater, but will also take insects, lizards, eggs, and frogs. Flocks will follow keel-billed toucans to exploit their sources of food.

=== Reproduction ===
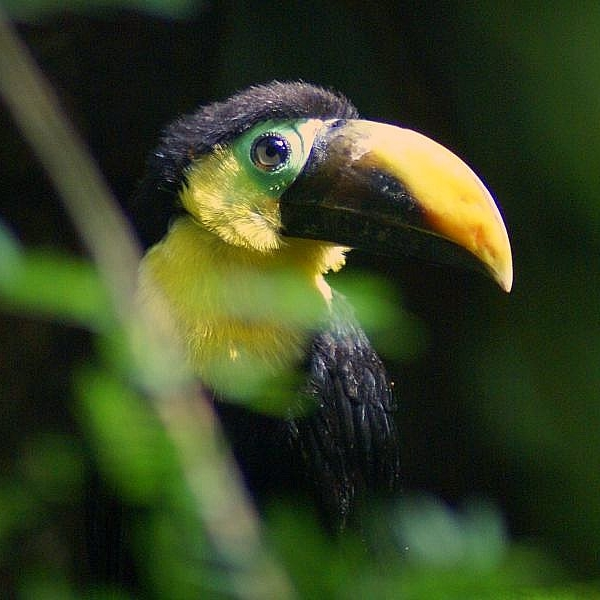
Juvenile in Panama

The chestnut-mandibled toucan is a resident breeder in moist lowland forest. The 2–4 white eggs are laid in an unlined cavity high in a decayed section of a living tree, or occasionally in an old woodpecker nest in a dead tree.

Both sexes incubate the eggs for at 14–15 days, and the toucan chicks remain in the nest after hatching. They are blind and naked at birth, and have short bills and specialised pads on their heels to protect them from the rough floor of the nest. They are fed by both parents, and fledge after about 6 weeks.

== Aviculture ==
Chestnut-mandibled toucans are sometimes kept as pets. They are the most readily available 'large toucan' species available in aviculture in the USA; but are considered noisy when compared to other species of toucans. It is illegal to take toucans or any other protected wild bird species from their nests.
