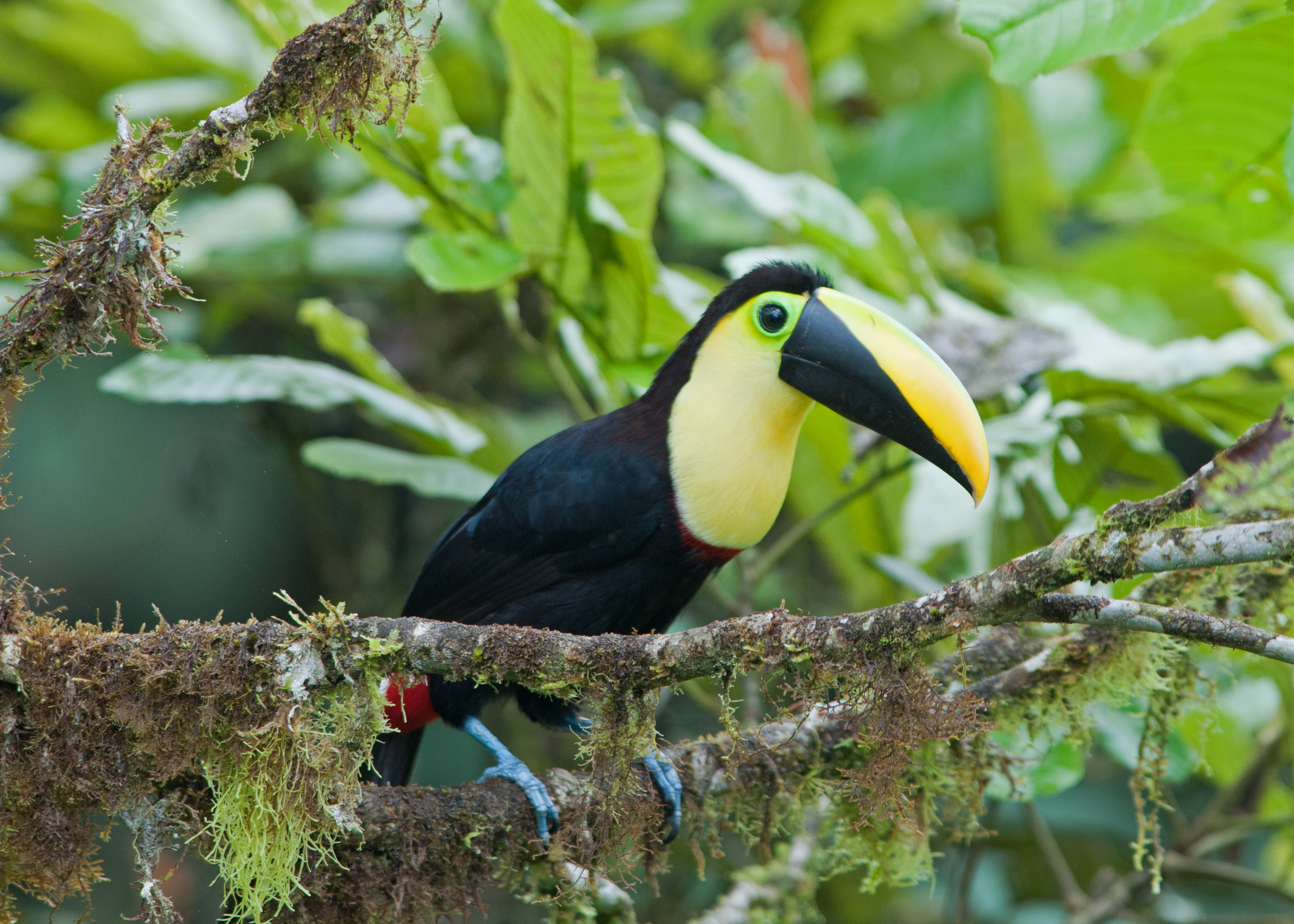

Conservation status
- Least Concern (IUCN 3.1)

Scientific classification
- Kingdom: Animalia
- Phylum: Chordata
- Class: Aves
- Order: Piciformes
- Family: Ramphastidae
- Genus: Ramphastos
- Species: R. brevis

Binomial name
- Ramphastos brevis Meyer de Schauensee, 1945
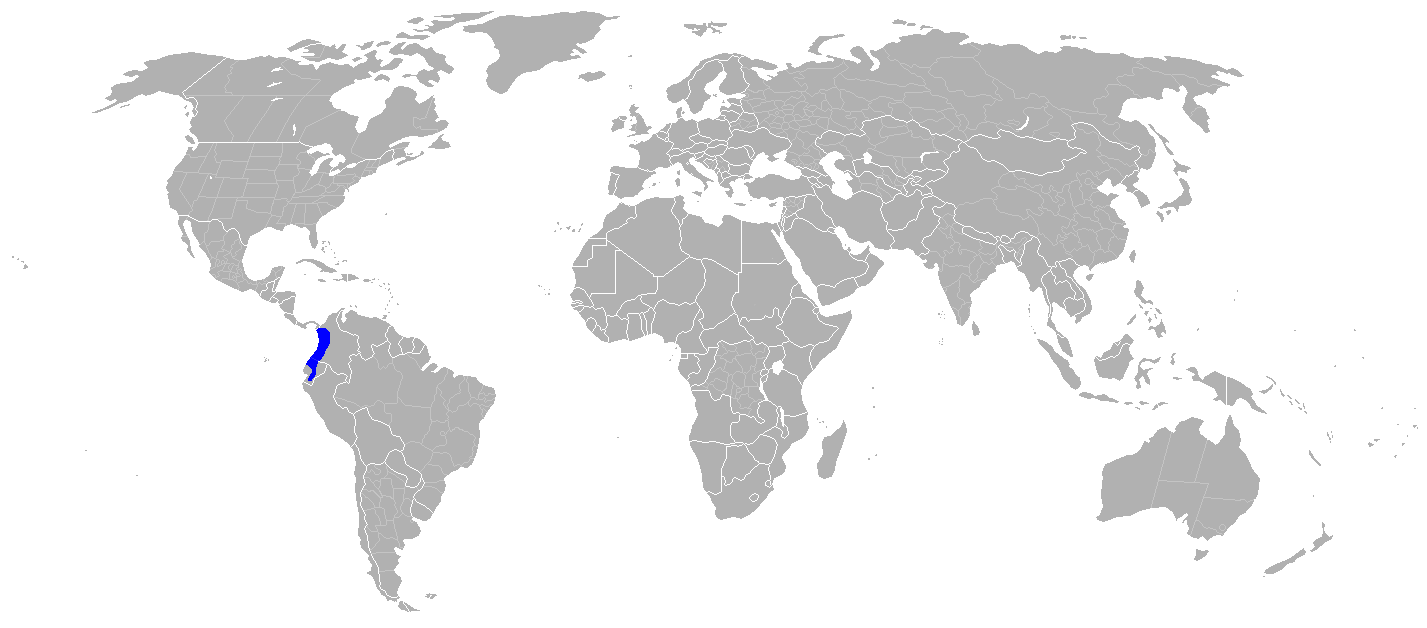
- Estimated Choco toucan range in blue

Synonyms
- Ramphastos ambiguus brevis

= Choco toucan =

Species of bird

The Choco toucan (Ramphastos brevis) is a bird in the family Ramphastidae, the toucans, toucanets, and aracaris. It is found in Colombia and Ecuador.

== Taxonomy and systematics ==
The Choco toucan was long treated as a subspecies of the yellow-throated toucan (R. ambiguus) but vocal differences and other characteristics led to their being split. It and the channel-billed toucan (R. vitellinus) are sister species. The Choco toucan is monotypic.

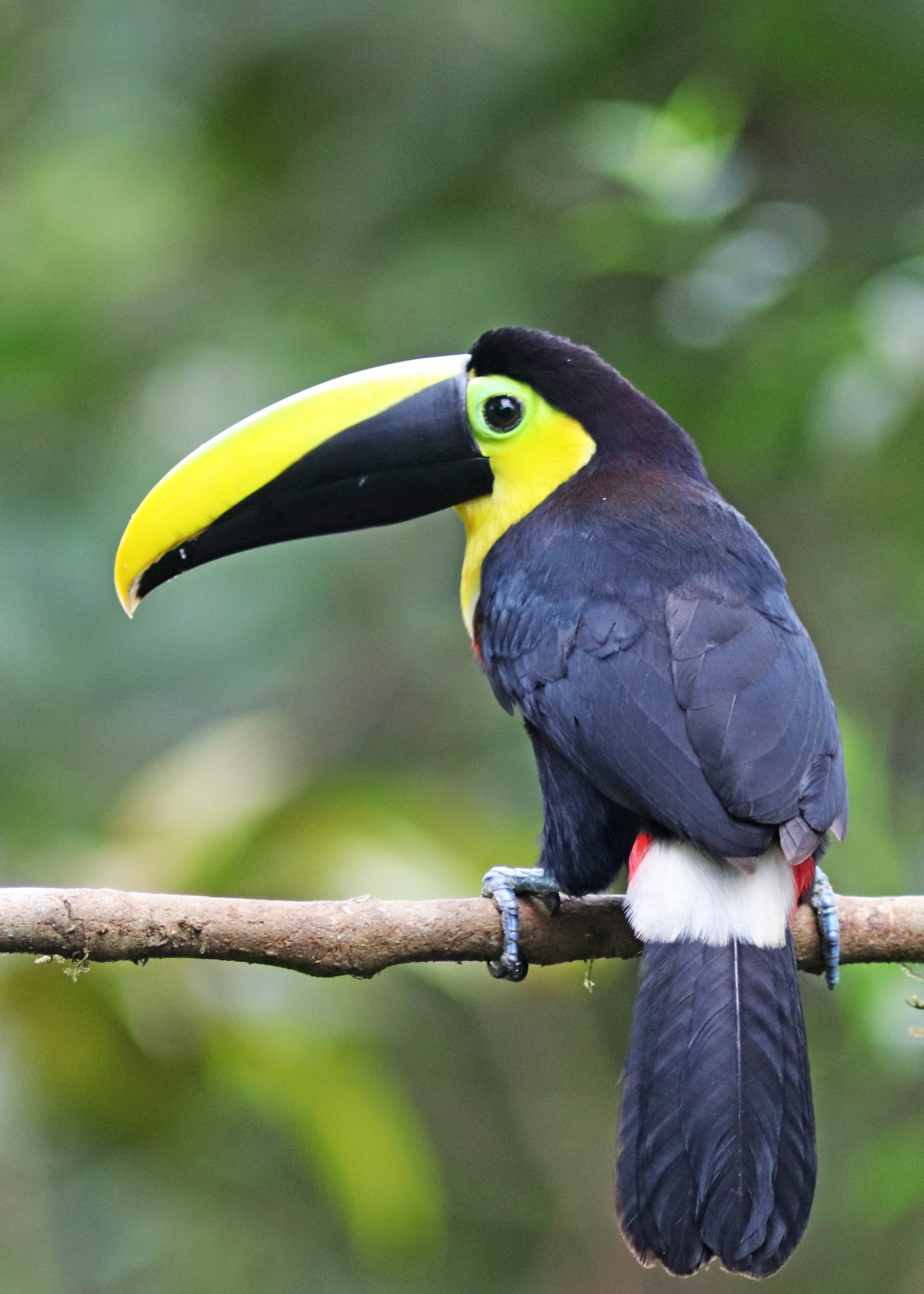
In northwestern Ecuador showing white uppertail coverts and edges of red undertail coverts

== Description ==
The Choco toucan is 46 to 48.5 cm (18 to 19 in) long and weighs 365 to 482 g (13 to 17 oz). The sexes are alike though the female's bill is shorter than the male's. Their bill's maxilla is mostly yellow with some green on the culmen and a black triangle at its base. Their mandible is black, sometimes with a yellow tip. Their crown and nape are black with a maroon tinge; their upperparts and tail are black except for white uppertail coverts. Bare yellow-green to olive green skin surrounds their eye. Their throat and breast are yellow with a narrow red band below the breast. Their belly is black and their undertail coverts red. The plumage is almost identical to that of the "chestnut-mandibled" subspecies of yellow-throated toucan (R. a. swainsonii), with which there is a range overlap, but their voices separate them.

== Distribution and habitat ==
As suggested by its common name, the Choco toucan is restricted to the humid Chocó region from northwestern Colombia to southwestern Ecuador. It mostly inhabits lowland and foothill forest but also occurs in pastures and plantations with fruiting trees that adjoin forest. In elevation it is found up to about 1,550 m (5,100 ft).

== Behavior ==
=== Movement ===
The Choco toucan does not have a migratory pattern, but pairs and groups move up- and downslope while foraging.

=== Feeding ===
The Choco toucan forages mostly in the forest canopy. Its diet is not known in detail but is mainly fruits and probably includes insects and small vertebrates. It has been noted following army ant swarms, probably to feed on prey disturbed by them.

== Breeding ==
The Choco toucan's breeding season appears to be mostly between June and August though it might begin much earlier in Colombia. Pairs display to each other by swinging their heads back and forth while vocalizing. Nothing else is known about their breeding biology.

=== Vocal and non-vocal sounds ===
The Choco toucan is one of the "croaker" group of toucans. Its call is "a steadily repeated series of croaking 'kreeork' notes, sometimes speeded up into a 'kriik'." It also clacks its bill and makes grating sounds with a closed bill.

== Status ==
The IUCN has assessed the Choco toucan as being of Least Concern. It has a large range, but its population size is not known and is believed to be decreasing. No immediate threats have been identified. It is considered uncommon to locally common in Ecuador, and occurs in at least one protected area in each of that country and Colombia. It is hunted for food and traditional medicine practices. It "[r]equires study in order to determine its requirements, and to ascertain whether its present conservation status needs to be reassessed."
