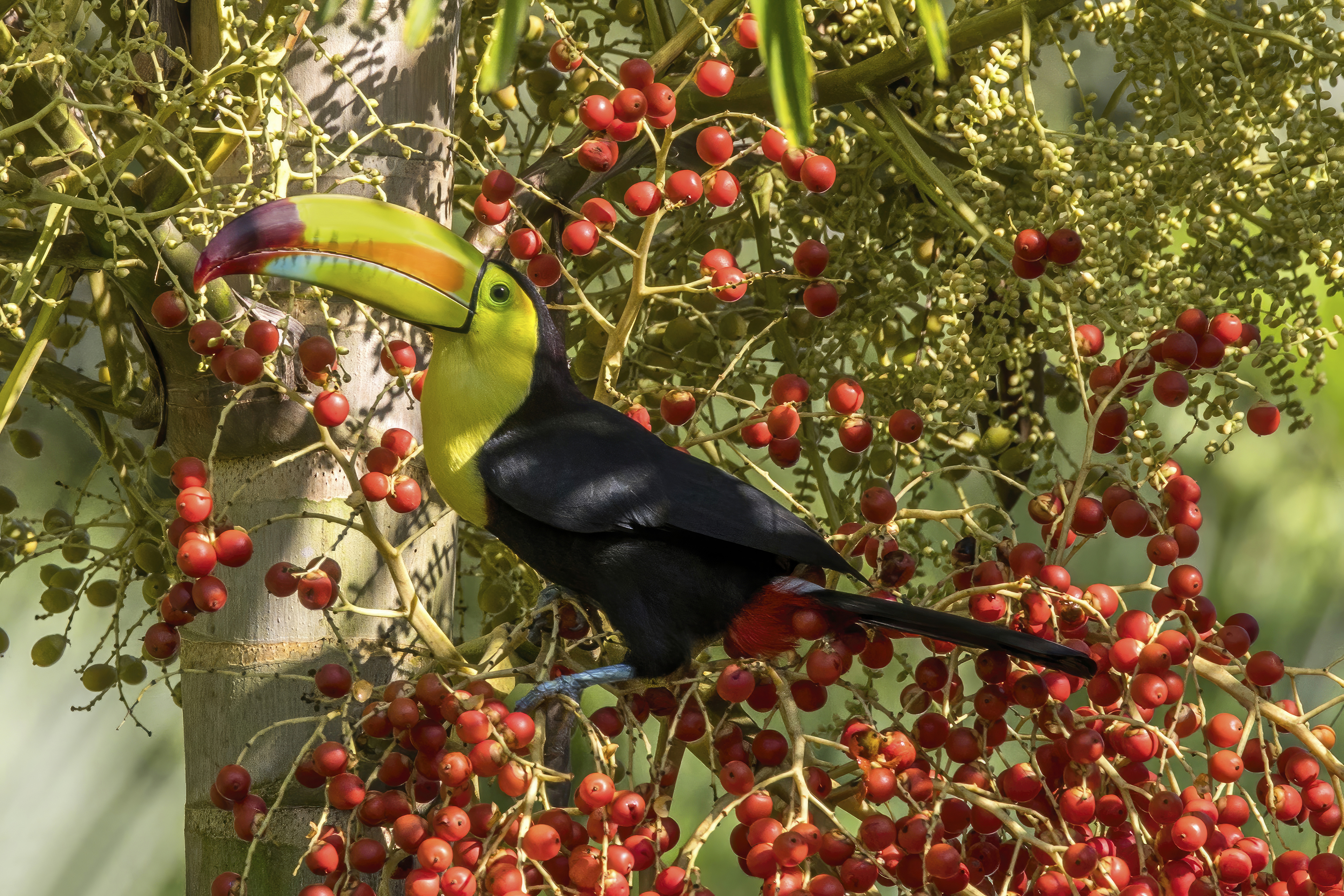
- R. s. sulfuratus eating Wodyetia bifurcata palm fruit, Cayo, Belize

Conservation status
- Near Threatened (IUCN 3.1)
- CITES Appendix II

Scientific classification
- Kingdom: Animalia
- Phylum: Chordata
- Class: Aves
- Order: Piciformes
- Family: Ramphastidae
- Genus: Ramphastos
- Species: R. sulfuratus

Binomial name
- Ramphastos sulfuratus Lesson, 1830

Subspecies
- R. s. sulfuratus Lesson, 1830; R. s. brevicarinatus Gould, 1854
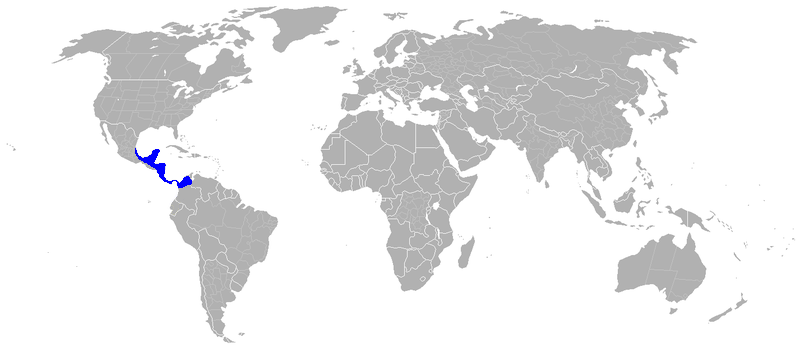

= Keel-billed toucan =

Species of bird

The keel-billed toucan (Ramphastos sulfuratus), also known as rainbow-billed toucan or sulphur-breasted toucan, is a species of toucan native to southern Mexico, Central America and the far northwest of South America, and is found in tropical forests. It is the national bird of Belize. It is an omnivorous forest bird that feeds on fruits, seeds, insects, invertebrates, lizards, snakes, and small birds and their eggs.

== Description ==
Including its bill, the length of the keel-billed toucan ranges from around 42 to 55 cm (17 to 22 in), while its wing length typically ranges from 189.4 to 208.4 mm (7.46 to 8.20 in). The bird typically weighs about 380–500 g (13–18 oz).

The large and brightly coloured bill averages around 12–15 cm (4.7–5.9 in), about one third of the bird's total length. The bill is mainly green with a red tip and orange sides. While the bill seems large and cumbersome, it is in fact a spongy, hollow bone covered in keratin, a very light and hard protein. It has been suggested that the bill colour may also help regulate body temperature, using the many blood vessels running through it.

The plumage of the keel-billed toucan is mainly black, with a yellow neck and chest, red under-tail coverts, and a narrow red band at the base of the yellow on the chest. Moulting occurs once per year. It has blue feet and red feathers at the tip of its tail.

As with almost all birds in the order Piciformes, keel-billed toucans have zygodactyl feet, with toes 2 and 3 facing forwards, and toes 1 and 4 facing backwards, so two toes face forward and two face back. Because toucans spend a large portion of time in the trees, this may help the birds to stay on the branches of the trees and jump from one branch to another.

Other than size, males and females of the species look similar.

== Taxonomy and systematics ==
=== Subspecies ===
Two subspecies are accepted, which intergrade where their ranges meet:

| Image | Subspecies | Distribution |
|---|---|---|
| | Ramphastos sulfuratus sulfuratus Lesson, 1830 | Found in southeastern Mexico, Belize and northern Guatemala. Red chest band below the yellow breast very narrow, often not visible. |
| | Ramphastos sulfuratus brevicarinatus Gould, 1854 | Originally described as a separate species. Found in southeastern Guatemala to northern Colombia and just into the far northwest of Venezuela. Slightly smaller than R. s. sulfuratus, and with a somewhat broader red band on the chest. |

== Distribution and habitat ==
The keel-billed toucan can be found from Southern Mexico to Venezuela and Colombia. This includes Belize, where it is the national bird. It roosts in the canopies of tropical, subtropical, and lowland rainforests, up to altitudes of 1,900 m (6,200 ft). It roosts in holes in trees, often with several other toucans. Although the toucans reside in the forests of these areas, they can also be seen in neighboring plantations, pastures, and second-growth forests.

== Behaviour and ecology ==
Like many other toucans, keel-billed toucans are very social birds and are rarely seen alone. They fly in small flocks of approximately six to twelve individuals through lowland rainforests. Their flight is slow and undulating, consisting of rapid wing beats (six to ten), then a glide with the bird's beak extending forward and dipping downward as though pulling the rest of the bird. Their feet are drawn up forward in flight. The flight distances are typically short.

They live together in groups, often sharing cramped living quarters of holes in trees, where five or six birds could fit into a single hole together. The birds look for holes around between 3–27 m off the ground, with smaller holes for an entrance. In order to fit in these small holes, the birds fold their tail over their body and tuck the large beak along their backs. This position also keeps the birds' body temperature at a normal level while they sleep. Adding to the lack of space, the bottoms of the holes are often covered with seed stones from the fruit the toucans have eaten.

Keel-billed toucan's call

In the wild

There is a family structure within the group. Birds often "duel" with each other using their bills, and throw fruit into each other's mouths. They 'play ball', one throwing a fruit in the air and a second seizing it.

Calls by the birds include sounds like "grr", "trrii" and "rrrk". A louder male can be heard from a kilometre away. They also communicate with non-vocal noises by clacking their large beaks and beating their wings.

Predators include hawk-eagles and collared forest falcons, the latter a significant predator in some cases.

=== Breeding ===
When courting, the birds will exchange fruit with each other.

The female keel-billed toucan lays 1–4 white eggs in a natural or already-made tree cavity. The male and female share in the caring of the eggs, both taking turns incubating. The eggs hatch approximately 15–20 days after being laid. After hatching, the male and female again take turns feeding the chicks. When the chicks hatch, they have no feathers, and have their eyes closed for approximately 3 weeks. The chicks have adequately formed heel pads, which assist on the seed-covered bottom of the nest. The chicks stay in their nest for approximately eight to nine weeks while their bills develop fully and they are ready to fledge from the nest.

Keel-billed toucans can have as many as 3 broods each year.

=== Food and feeding ===
The diet of keel-billed toucans consists mostly of a wide range of fruit, such as Cymbopetalum mayanum (Annonaceae) and gumbo-limbo (Bursera simaruba), but may also include insects, eggs, nestlings, and lizards. The bill, surprisingly dexterous, allows this toucan to utilize a large variety of fruit that might not otherwise be reached. When eating the fruit, it uses its bill to dissect the fruit, and then tosses its head back to swallow the fruit whole.

Typically, the toucan eats off the ground, from mid-story to the forest canopy. Rarely, it may eat on the floor of the forest. The keel-billed toucan is possibly the first toucan observed eating carrion, by a team of researchers in 2018 in Costa Rica.

The toucan's diet has an effect on the plants that it eats, as large seeds digested and vomited by the birds have a higher chance of sprouting than those which are not eaten.

Occasionally, the chestnut-mandibled toucan will follow the keel-billed toucan to a source of food, and then chase away the smaller bird.

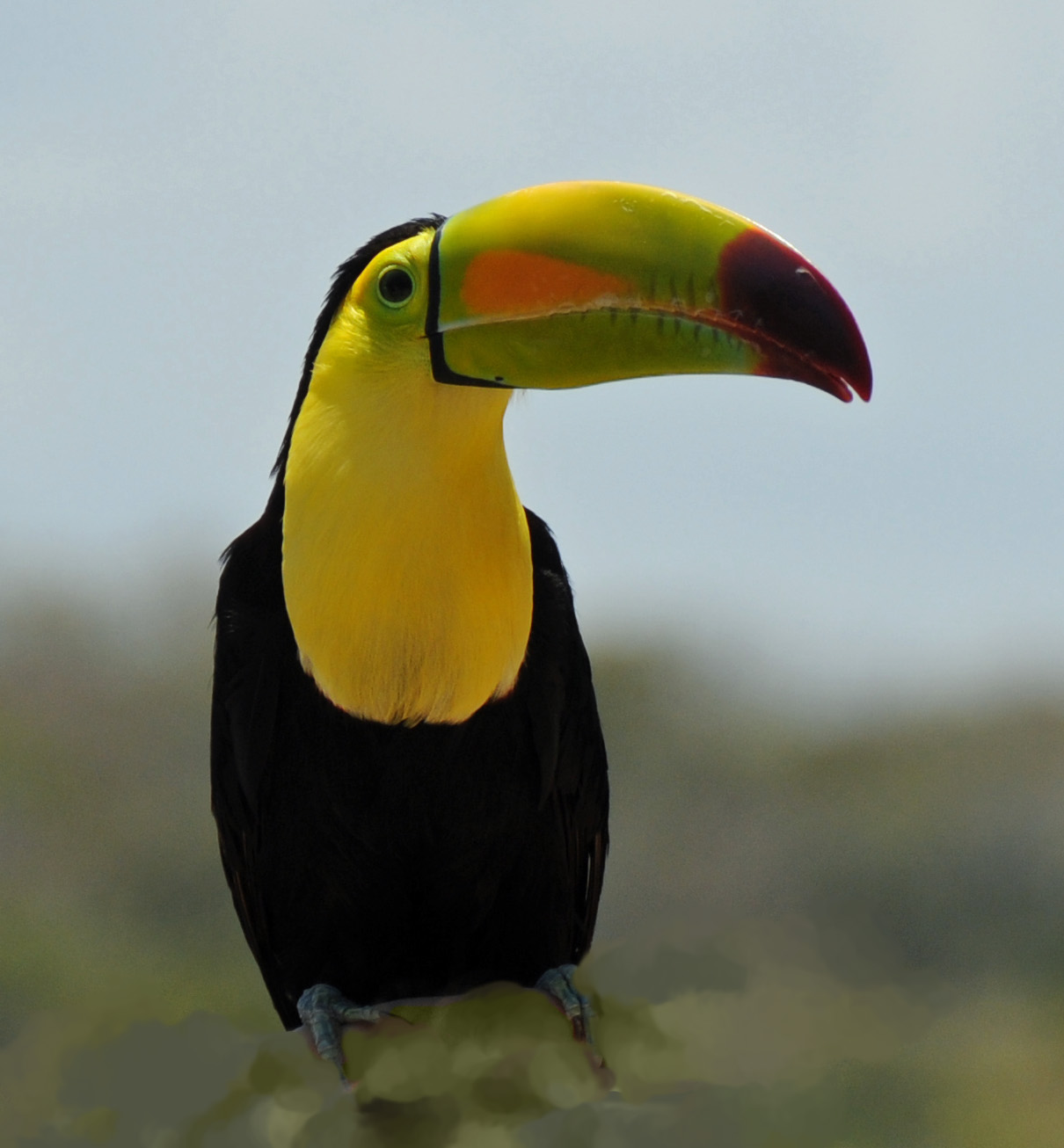
R. s. sulfuratus in Mexico

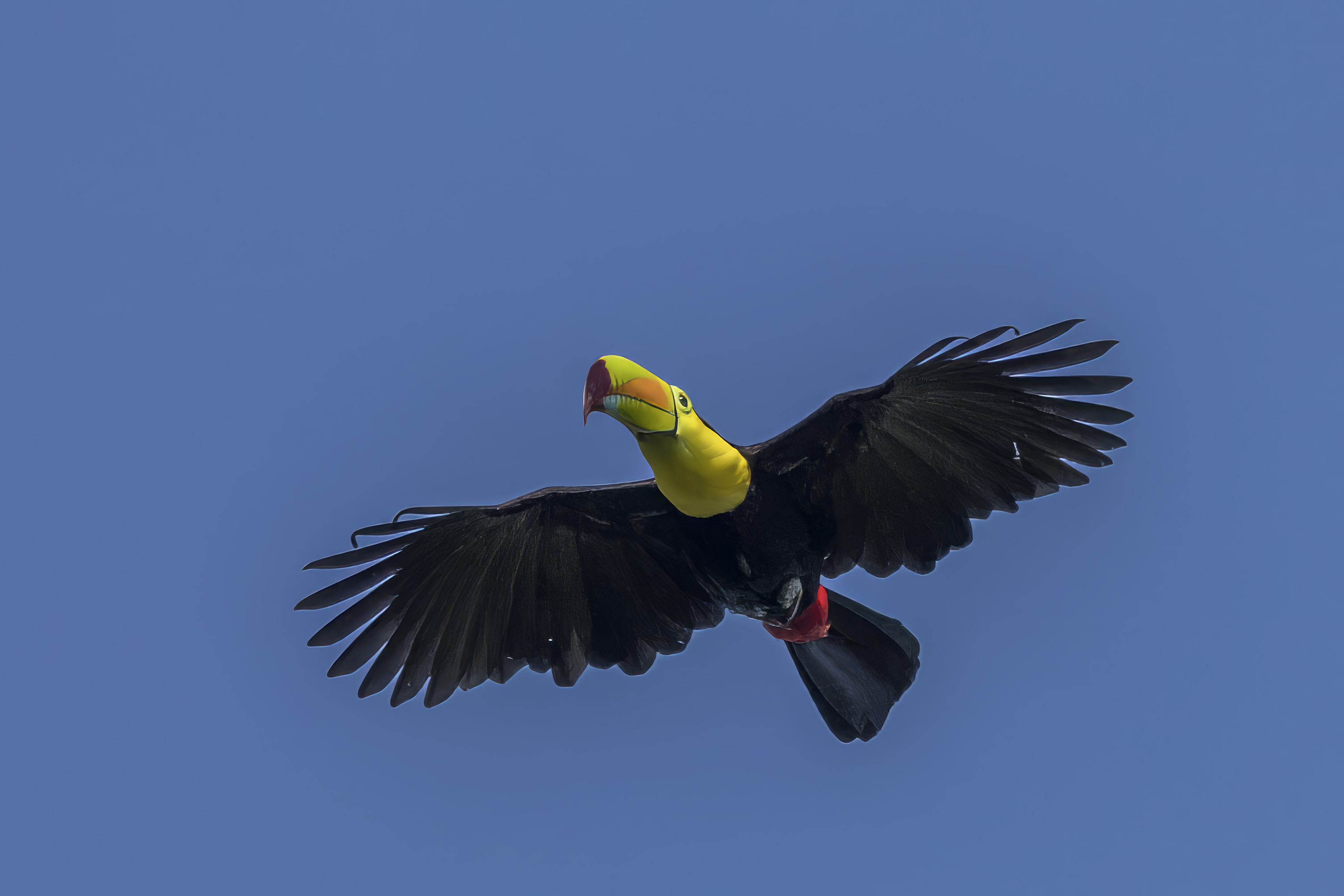
R. s. sulfuratus in flight, Peten, Guatemala

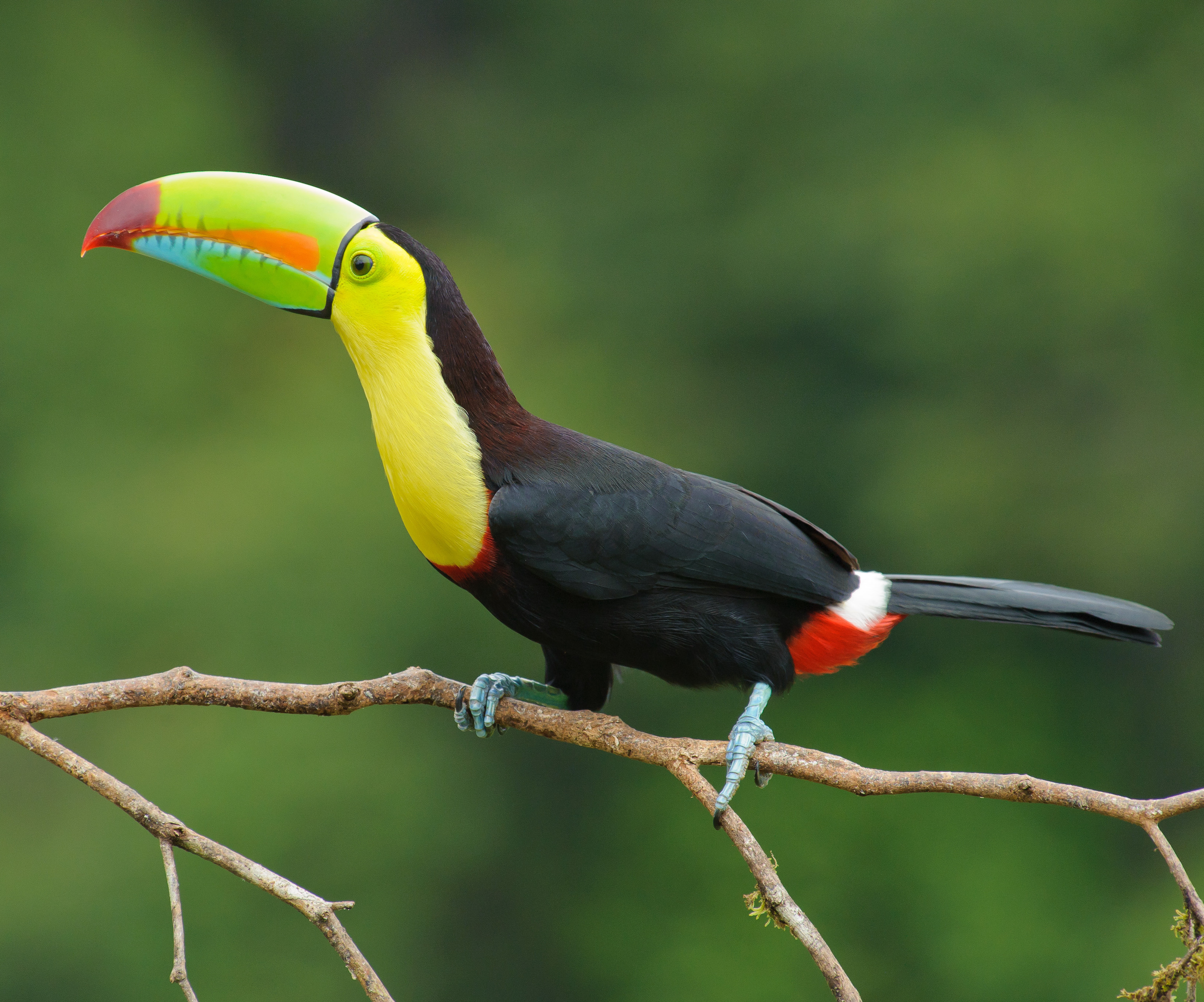
R. s. brevicarinatus in Costa Rica

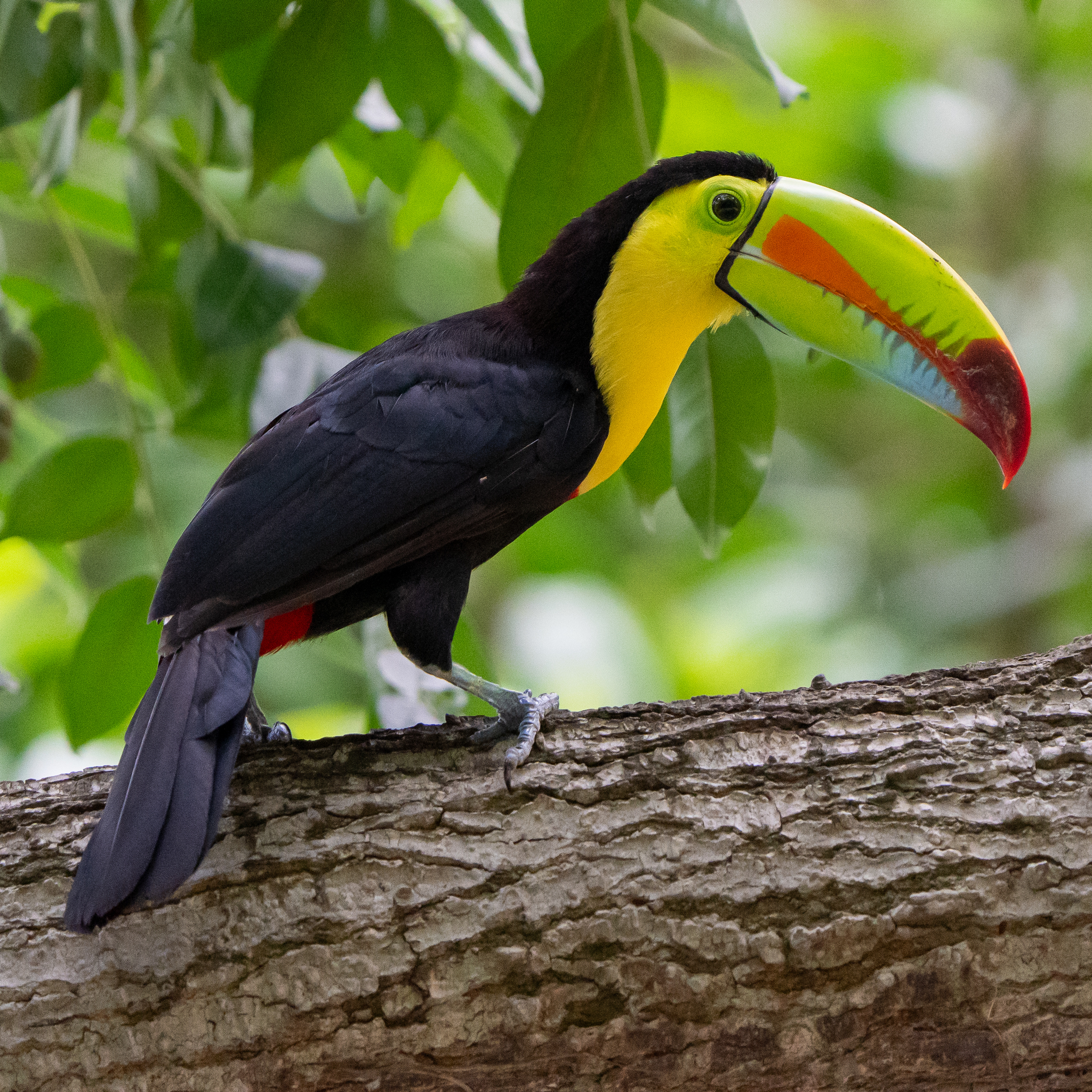
R. s. brevicarinatus in Cerro Ancon Reserve, Panama

== Status ==
The keel-billed toucan is threatened by habitat loss, which has been accelerating in recent years, and by hunting and trapping for the wildlife trade. In 2015 a keel-billed toucan could fetch up to $2,000 on the illegal market. The species is undergoing a moderately rapid population decline and is therefore listed as a near-threatened species. The decline rate in 2021 of the past 3 generations was estimated to be from 10–19%, although future population declines were estimated at a higher 20–29%.

== Aviculture ==
The keel-billed toucan is sometimes kept in captivity, but it requires a high-fruit diet and is sensitive to haemochromatosis, an iron storage disease. It and the Toco toucan are the most common toucans to be kept as pets.
