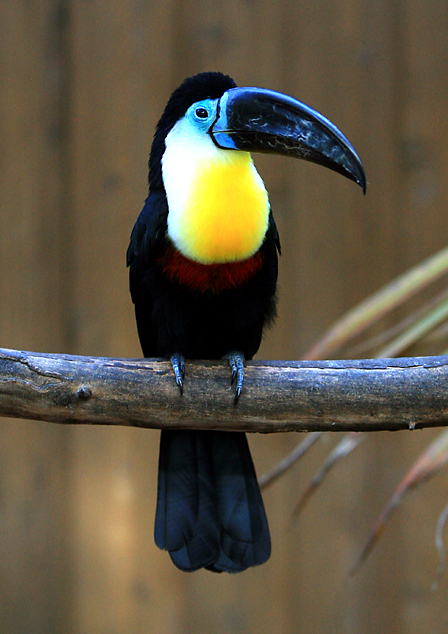
- R. v. vitellinus at Matsue Vogel Park, Japan

Conservation status
- Least Concern (IUCN 3.1)
- CITES Appendix II

Scientific classification
- Kingdom: Animalia
- Phylum: Chordata
- Class: Aves
- Order: Piciformes
- Family: Ramphastidae
- Genus: Ramphastos
- Species: R. vitellinus

Binomial name
- Ramphastos vitellinus Lichtenstein, MHC, 1823

Subspecies
- See text

= Channel-billed toucan =

Species of bird

The channel-billed toucan (Ramphastos vitellinus) is a species of bird in the family Ramphastidae found on the Caribbean island of Trinidad and in tropical South America as far south as southern Brazil and central Bolivia.

== Taxonomy ==
The channel-billed toucan was formally described in 1823 as Ramphastos vitellinus by the German naturalist Hinrich Lichtenstein. The specific epithet is Medieval Latin meaning "deep yellow colour tinged red", from Latin vitellus meaning "yolk of an egg". The type location is Cayenne in French Guiana.

=== Subspecies ===
Four subspecies are recognized:

Image	Subspecies	Distribution
	Yellow-ridged toucan (R. v. culminatus) – (Gould, 1833)	Upper Amazonia from western Venezuela to northern Bolivia
	R. v. vitellinus – Lichtenstein, 1823	Venezuela, the Guianas, northern Brazil and Trinidad
	Ariel toucan (R. v. ariel) – Vigors, 1826	Central and eastern Brazil south of the Amazon River
	Citron-throated toucan (R. v. citreolaemus) – Gould, J, 1844	northern Colombia and northwestern Venezuela

These subspecies were previously considered separate species, but all four will interbreed freely wherever they meet. However, the subspecies R. v. ariel is closer to R. v. culminatus than to the nominate, and are by some already considered close to distinct species status. As R. v. ariel was described before R. v. culminatus, if separated they would become Ramphastos ariel ariel and R. a. culminatus. There also exists an isolated population in eastern Brazil. It looks very similar to, and has traditionally been considered part of, R. v. ariel, but molecular analysis suggests that it has been isolated for a long time and is a yet-undescribed separate subspecies or possibly even species (Weckstein, 2005).

== Description ==
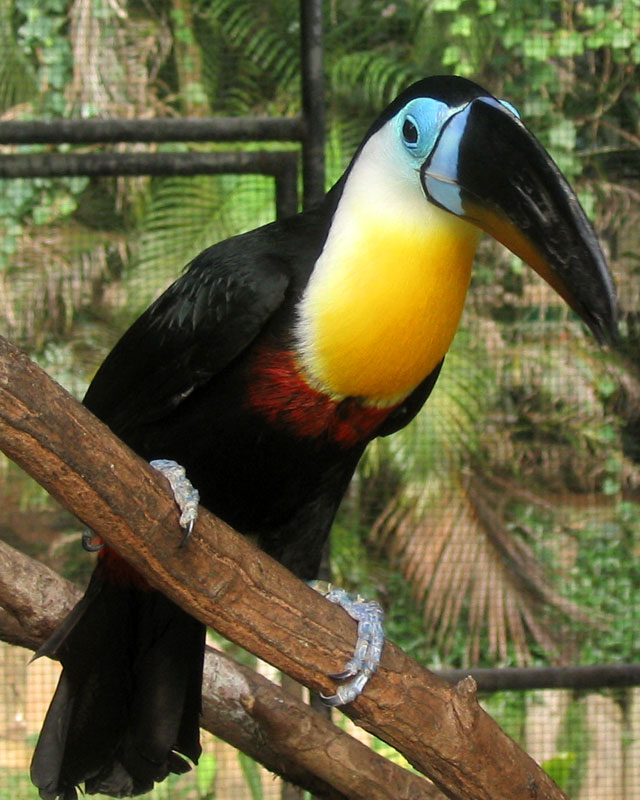
R. v. vitellinus in captivity

Like other toucans, the channel-billed is brightly marked and has a huge bill. It is typically 48 cm (19 in) long with a 9–14 cm (3½-5½ in) bill. It weighs 300–430 g (11–15 oz)

- Nominate race (R. v. vitellinus): Its upperparts, belly, tail and most of the bill are black, and the uppertail and undertail coverts are red. The bare eye-patch and bill base are blue, the throat is white, most of the central breast is yellow-orange fading to white laterally and the lower breast sharply contrasts with a broad transverse red band. The iris is dark brownish. It is found in the north-eastern part of this species' range.
- Race culminatus: It resembles the nominate, but has a yellow base of the upper mandible and ridge to its bill, orange-yellow uppertail coverts and the throat and breast are white (occasionally tinged yellow), with just a narrow red band separating the latter from the black belly. It occurs in the eastern and south-central part of this species' range. It is very similar to, and easily confused with, Cuvier's toucan (Ramphastos tucanus cuvieri).
- Race ariel: It resembles the nominate, but the base of its bill is yellow, the skin around the pale blue eye is red and the entire throat and chest are orange. It occurs in the south-east Amazon. The unnamed population from the coastal regions of eastern Brazil is virtually identical.
- Race citreolaemus. It resembles culminatus, but with a clear yellow tinge to the throat, a green tinge to the otherwise yellow culmen, a yellow-orange patch at the very base of the bill, and a pale bluish iris. It occurs in northern Colombia and north-western Venezuela.

Wherever the distributions of the subspecies meet, individuals with features that are intermediate compared to above described races are common due to hybridization. Some of these intermediate populations have sometimes been awarded subspecies status, e.g. theresae for the population in north-eastern Brazil and pintoi for populations in south-central Brazil (both are culminatus-ariel intergrades).

== Habitat ==
Found in forest and woodland. Prefers humid regions, but locally extends into drier regions (esp. along rivers). Mainly in lowlands, but locally to an altitude of 1,700 m (5,600 ft).

== Behavior ==
This species is an arboreal fruit-eater but will take insects, small reptiles, eggs and frogs. Typically consumed are lipid-rich fruits such as Virola and Euterpe palm fruits. Other fruits which the channel-billed toucan feeds upon are those borne by Cecropia, Ficus, Hevea, Nectandra, Oenocarpus, Pourouma and Pouteria. They will also consume papaya, mangoes, avocados and peppers if human intrusions into their habitat occur. The call is a croaking "cree-op cree-op cree-op".

The parents are both active in raising the young. The white eggs are laid in a high unlined tree cavity. There is a gestation period of 18 days, and the parents both incubate for 15 to 16 days. However, they can be impatient sitters, often leaving their eggs uncovered for hours at a time. Newborn toucans remain in the nest after hatching. They are blind and naked at birth, and their eyes open after about 3 weeks. They have short bills and specialized pads on their heels to protect them from the rough floor of the nest. The feathers do not begin to expand until they are nearly 4 weeks old. They are helpless and unable to leave the nest for about 8 weeks, dependent upon both parents to feed them. After this, the young can care for themselves. They begin to leave the nest after 40 to 50 days, depending on size.

== Gallery ==
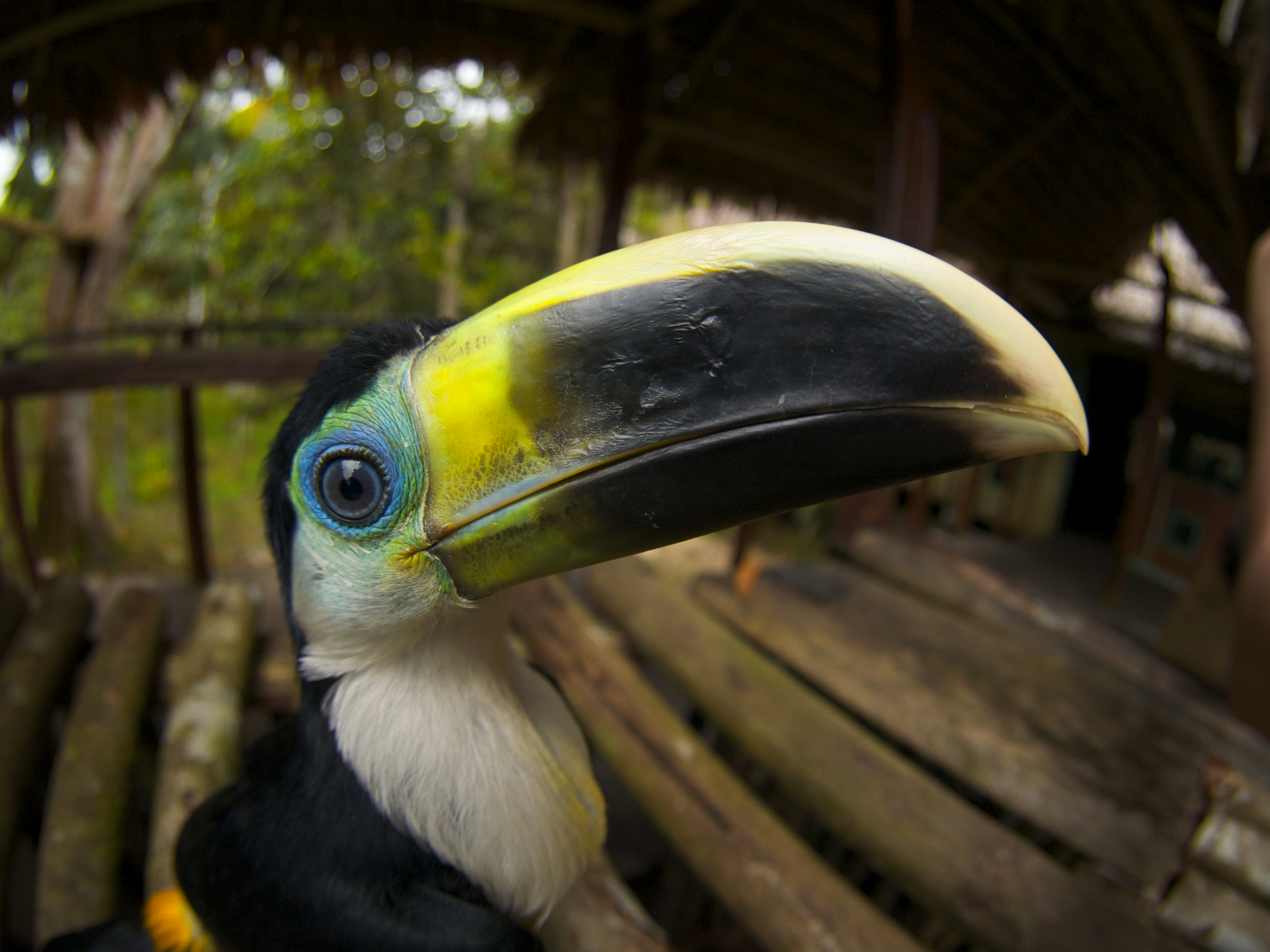
Juvenile R. v. culminatus

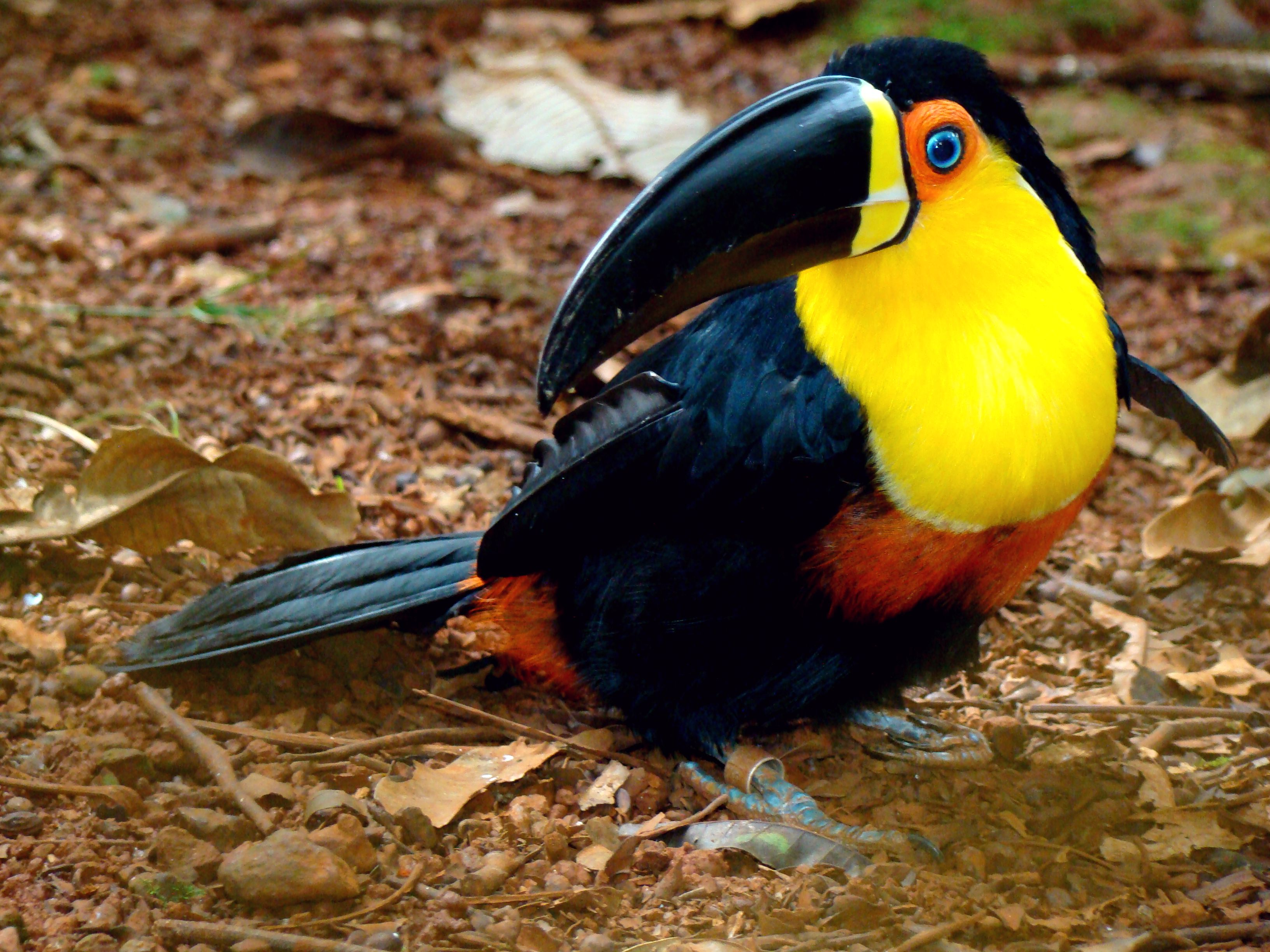
R. v. ariel

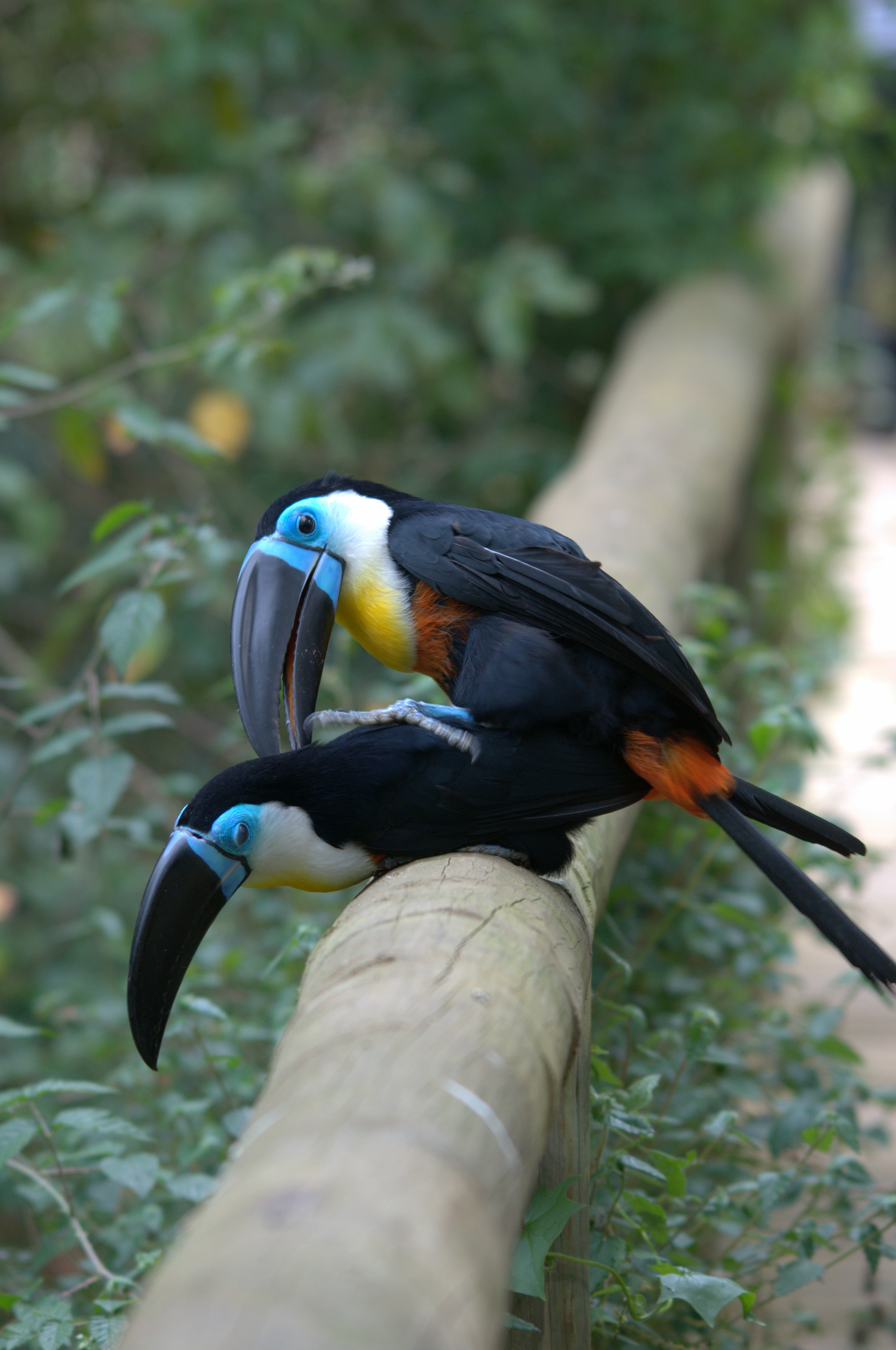
Mating at Birds of Eden, South Africa

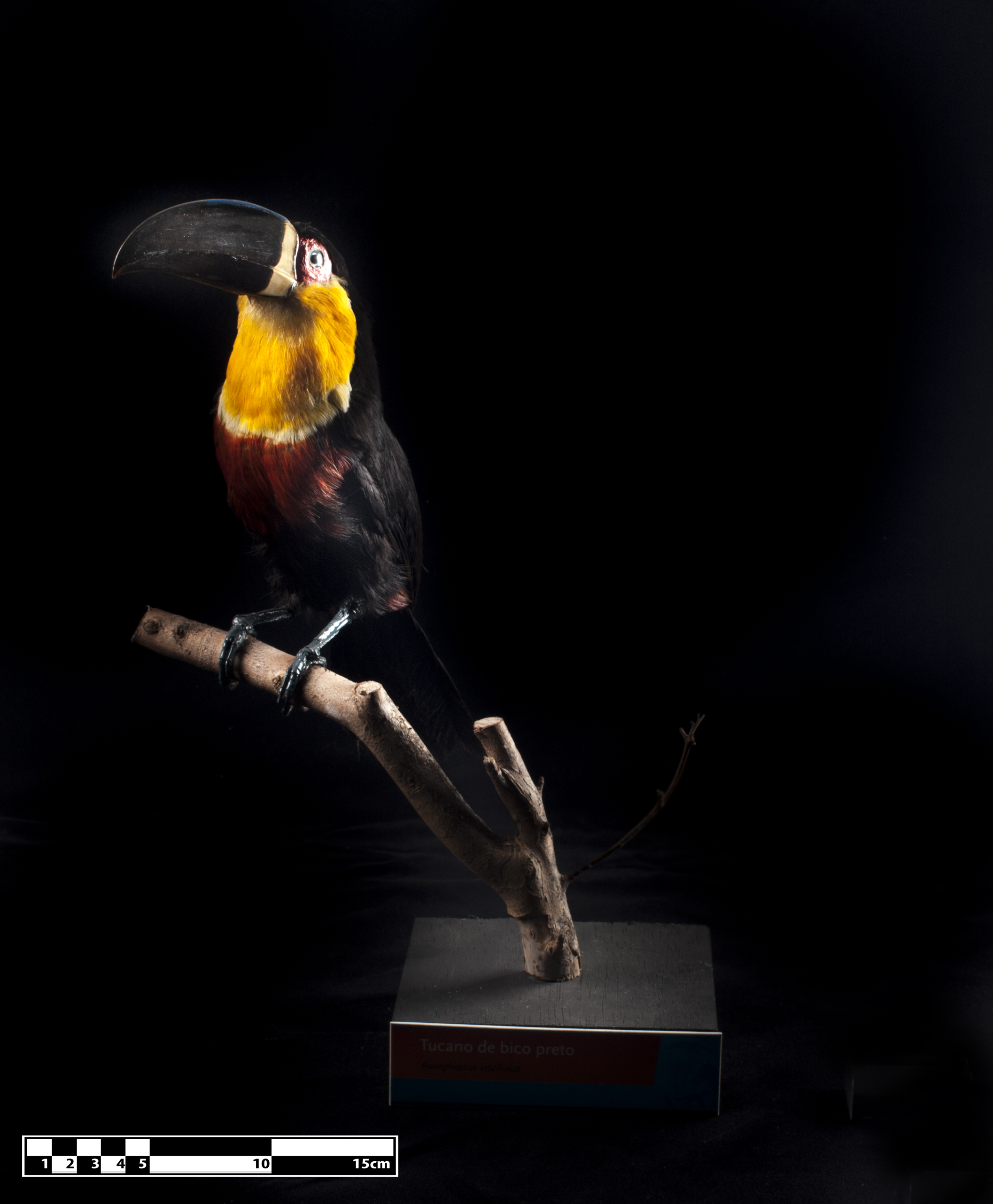
Toucan Black beak (Ramphastos vitellinus)

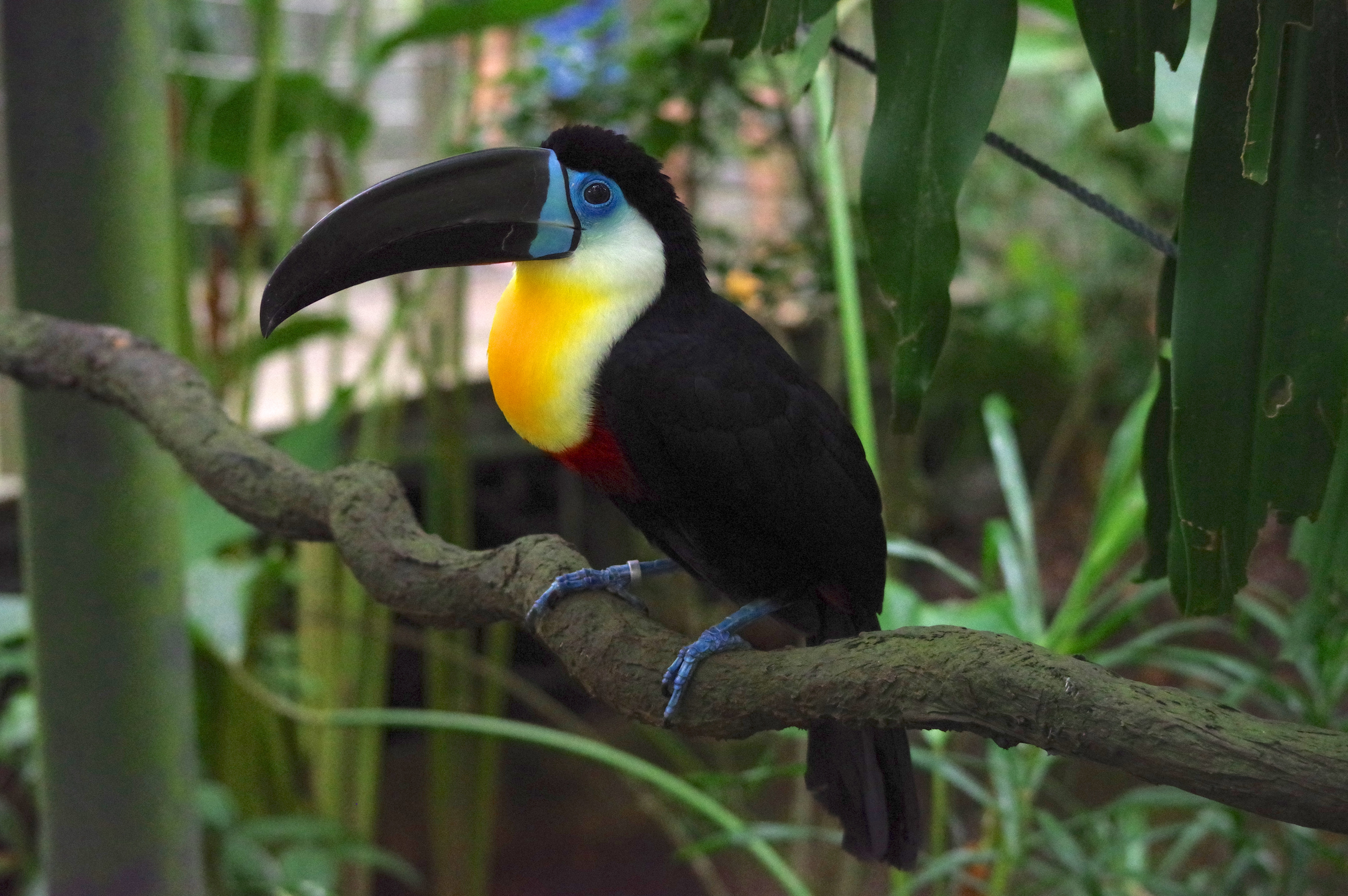
Toucan at Singapore Zoo
