= 100 of the World's Worst Invasive Alien Species =

100 of the World's Worst Invasive Alien Species is a list of invasive species compiled in 2000 from the Global Invasive Species Database, a database of invasive species around the world. The database is run by the Invasive Species Specialist Group (ISSG) of the International Union for Conservation of Nature (IUCN). The ISSG acknowledges that it is "very difficult to identify 100 invasive species from around the world that really are 'worse' than any others. ... Absence from the list does not imply that a species poses a lesser threat." In 2013, the ISSG updated their list to supersede the recently eradicated † rinderpest virus, and a few genus and species names were altered.

== Criteria for inclusion ==
Two criteria were used in selecting items for the list:

- An invasive species' "serious impact on biological diversity and/or human activities," and
- That species' "illustration of important issues surrounding biological invasion".

According to the ISSG, "only one species from each genus was selected." However, the renaming of Clidemia hirta now implies two Miconia species in the list.

== List of species ==
This list has been updated to reflect later changes in taxonomy, to ensure alphabetical order of genera, and to remove apparent errors. Common names may be ambiguous.

Genus & species	Type	Common names	Notes
Acacia mearnsii	Shrub	Black wattle, Australian acacia	Invasive worldwide. Native to Australia.
Acridotheres tristis	Bird	Calcutta myna, common myna, house myna, Indian myna, mina, minah, mynah, talking myna	Invasive in Australia, Hawaii, Israel, Fiji and New Zealand. Established and potentially invasive in parts of Europe and Africa. Native to South Asia.
Aedes albopictus	Insect	Asian tiger mosquito, forest day mosquito, tiger mosquito	Invasive worldwide. Native to Southeast Asia.
Anopheles quadrimaculatus	Insect	Common malaria mosquito	Invasive in the eastern United States.
Anoplolepis gracilipes	Insect	Crazy ant, gramang ant, long-legged ant, Maldive ant, yellow crazy ant	Invasive in Australia, Hawaii, and Indian Ocean islands.
Anoplophora glabripennis	Insect	Asian long-horned beetle, starry sky beetle	Invasive in North America, and established and potentially invasive in parts of Europe. Native to East Asia.
Aphanomyces astaci	Pseudo-fungus	Crayfish plague	Invasive in Europe. Native to North America.
Ardisia elliptica	Tree	Coralberry, duck's eye, shoebutton ardisia	Invasive in tropical Australia, South Florida, the Caribbean, and many Pacific and Indian Ocean islands. Native to South and Southeast Asia.
Arundo donax	Grass	Arundo grass, bamboo reed, cane, cow cane, donax cane, giant cane, giant reed, reedgrass, river cane, Spanish cane, Spanish reed, wild cane	Invasive in California, New Zealand and southern Brazil. Native to northern Africa and the Middle East.
Asterias amurensis	Echinoderm	Flatbottom sea star, Japanese sea star, Japanese starfish, North Pacific sea star, Northern Pacific sea star, purple-orange sea star	Invasive in the southern coasts of Australia. Native to far north Pacific Ocean coasts.
Babuvirus Banana bunchy top virus	Virus	Banana bunchy top disease, BBTD, BBTV, bunchy top, bunchy top virus	Invasive worldwide.
Batrachochytrium dendrobatidis	Fungus	Amphibian chytrid fungus, "Bd", chytrid frog fungi, chytridiomycosis, frog chytrid fungus	Invasive in Australia, New Zealand, and Panama.
Bemisia tabaci	Insect	Cotton whitefly, silverleaf whitefly, sweet potato whitefly, sweetpotato whitefly	Native to India, invasive worldwide.
Boiga irregularis	Reptile	Brown catsnake, brown tree snake, brown treesnake	Invasive in Guam. Native to Wallacea, New Guinea, Melanesia, and Northern and Eastern Australia.
Capra hircus	Mammal	Domestic goat, feral goat, goat	Invasive worldwide. See also feral goats in Australia.
Carcinus maenas	Crustacean	European green crab, European shore crab, green crab, shore crab	Invasive in North America, Australia, parts of South America and South Africa. Native to Europe and North Africa.
Caulerpa taxifolia	Seaweed	Killer algae, killer seaweed	Invasive in the Mediterranean Sea. Native to the Indian Ocean.
Cecropia peltata	Tree	Faux-ricin, pumpwood, snakewood, trumpet tree	Invasive in Malaysia, Africa, and Pacific Islands. Native to tropical Central and South America.
Cercopagis pengoi	Crustacean	Fishhook waterflea	Invasive in Eastern Europe and in the Baltic Sea. Native to the Ponto-Aralo-Caspian basin.
Cervus elaphus	Mammal	Red deer, European red deer, western red deer, elk (Note: Not Alces alces, called "elk" in Eurasia, and "moose" in North America; nor Cervus canadensis, called "elk" or "wapiti" in North America.)	Invasive in South America, New Zealand, and Australia. Native to Europe, Western Asia, and North Africa.
Chromolaena odorata	Herb	Bitter bush, camfhur grass, Christmas bush, common floss flower, devil weed, jack in the bush, Siam weed, triffid	Invasive in tropical Asia, Africa, and the Pacific. Native to Neotropics.
Cinara cupressi	Insect	Cypress aphid	Invasive worldwide. Native to Middle East.
Cinchona pubescens	Tree	Quina, red cinchona	Invasive in Hawaii, the Galapagos Islands, and Tahiti. Native to Central and South America.
Clarias batrachus	Fish	Clarias catfish, climbing perch, freshwater catfish, Thailand catfish, walking catfish	Invasive in North America. Native to Southeast Asia.
Coptotermes formosanus	Insect	Formosan subterranean termite, Formosan termite	Invasive in South Africa, Hawaii, and the United States mainland. Native to southern Japan, Taiwan, and South China.
Cryphonectria parasitica	Fungus	Chestnut blight	Invasive in North America. Native to East and Southeast Asia.
Cyprinus carpio	Fish	Common carp, Eurasian carp, European carp, fancy carp, feral carp, German carp, grass carp, Japanese domesticated carp, king carp, koi, koi carp, leather carp, mirror carp, Oriental carp, scale carp, wild carp	Invasive worldwide. Native to East Asia.
Dreissena polymorpha	Mollusc	Eurasian zebra mussel, wandering mussel, zebra mussel	Invasive in North America and Western Europe. Native to Eastern Europe.
Eleutherodactylus coqui	Amphibian	Caribbean tree frog, common coquí, coqui, Puerto Rican treefrog	Invasive in Hawaii, Virgin Islands, Dominican Republic, and Florida. Native to Puerto Rico.
Eriocheir sinensis	Crustacean	Big sluice crab, Chinese freshwater edible crab, Chinese mitten crab, Chinese river crab, Shanghai hairy crab	Invasive in Europe and North America. Native to East Asia.
Euglandina rosea	Mollusc	Cannibal snail, rosy wolfsnail	Invasive in Indian and Pacific Ocean islands. Native to the southeastern United States.
Euphorbia esula	Herb	Green spurge, leafy spurge, spurge, wolf's milk	Invasive worldwide. Native to Europe and temperate Asia.
Felis catus	Mammal	Cat, domestic cat, feral cat, house cat	Invasive worldwide.
Gambusia affinis	Fish	Gambezi, live-bearing tooth-carp, mosquitofish, mosquito fish, western mosquitofish	Invasive worldwide. Native to the fresh waters of the eastern and southern United States.
Hedychium gardnerianum	Herb	Ginger lily, kahila garland-lily, kahili ginger, wild ginger	Invasive in Hawaii and New Zealand. Native to Himalayas.
Hiptage benghalensis	Shrub	Hiptage	Invasive in Australian rainforests, Mauritius, and Réunion. Native to South Asia and Southeast Asia.
Imperata cylindrica	Grass	Blady grass, cogon grass, Japanese bloodgrass, speargrass	Invasive worldwide, including the southeastern United States. Native to tropical and subtropical Asia, Micronesia, Melanesia, Australia, Africa, and Southern Europe.
Lantana camara	Shrub	Angel lips, big sage, blacksage, common lantana, flowered sage, largeleaf lantana, prickly lantana, Spanish flag, West Indian Lantana, white sage, wild sage	Invasive worldwide. Native to the American tropics.
Lates niloticus	Fish	African snook, Nile perch, Victoria perch	Invasive worldwide. Contributed to the decline of haplochromines in Lake Victoria. Native to Africa.
Leucaena leucocephala	Tree	False koa, faux mimosa, faux-acacia, horse/wild tamarind, jumbie bean, lead tree, white leadtree, wild mimosa, wild tamarind	Native to Central America, invasive throughout other tropical regions.
Ligustrum robustum	Shrub	Bora-bora, Ceylon privét, Sri Lankan privet, tree privet	Invasive in the Mascarene Islands (Mauritius and Réunion). Native to South Asia and Southeast Asia.
Linepithema humile	Insect	Argentine ant	Invasive worldwide. Native to South America.
Lissachatina fulica (syn. Achatina fulica) (Note: The ISSG lists it as Achatina fulica.)	Mollusc	African giant snail, giant African land snail, giant African snail	Invasive in South Asia, Southeast Asia, East Asia, the Pacific, Indian Ocean islands, the West Indies, and the United States. Native to East Africa.
Lithobates catesbeianus (Note: The ISSG booklet gives it as Rana catesbeiana.)	Amphibian	American bullfrog, bullfrog, North American bullfrog	Invasive in Central and South America, the Caribbean, Western Europe, and East Asia. Native to eastern North America.
Lymantria dispar	Insect	Asian gypsy moth, Asian spongy moth, spongy moth	Invasive worldwide. Native to East Asia.
Lythrum salicaria	Herb	Purple loosestrife, purple lythrum, rainbow weed, spiked loosestrife	Invasive worldwide. Native to Europe.
Macaca fascicularis	Mammal	Crab-eating macaque, cynomolgus monkey, long-tailed macaque	Invasive in Mauritius, Palau (Angaur Island), Hong Kong, and parts of Indonesia (Tinjil Island and Papua). Native to Southeast Asia.
Melaleuca quinquenervia	Tree	Broad-leaved paperbark tree, broad-leaved tea tree, five-veined paperbark tree, paper bark tree, paperbark tea tree, punk tree, white bottlebrush tree	Invasive in Florida. Native to New Caledonia, Papua New Guinea, and coastal Eastern Australia.
Miconia calvescens	Tree	Bush currant, purple plague, velvet tree	Invasive in Pacific Islands, including Hawaii and Tahiti. Native to rainforests of tropical America.
Miconia crenata (syn. Clidemia hirta) (Note: The ISSG lists it as Clidemia hirta.)	Shrub	Clidemia, faux vatouk, Koster's curse, soap bush, soapbush	Invasive in Hawaii, Indian Ocean islands (Seychelles), peninsular Malaysia, and parts of Micronesia (Palau).
Micropterus salmoides	Fish	American black bass, bass, black bass, green bass, green trout, largemouth bass, largemouth black bass, northern largemouth bass, stormundet black bass	Invasive worldwide. Native to the eastern United States.
Mikania micrantha	Vine	American rope, bitter vine, Chinese creeper, climbing hemp vine, mile-a-minute weed	Invasive in the Pacific. Native to Neotropics.
Mimosa pigra	Shrub	Bashful plant, catclaw, catclaw mimosa, giant sensitive plant, giant trembling plant, mimosa	Invasive in Southeast Asia and Australia. Rice crop pest. Native to South America.
Mnemiopsis leidyi	Comb jelly	American comb jelly, comb jelly, comb jellyfish, sea gooseberry, sea walnut, Venus' girdle, warty comb jelly	Invasive in Southeast European waters, including the Black, Azov, Marmara, Aegean, and Caspian Seas. Native to temperate, subtropical estuaries along the Atlantic coast of North and South America.
Mus musculus	Mammal	House mouse (Note: The ISSG list includes the names "field mouse" and "wood mouse", which are Apodemus sylvaticus.)	Invasive worldwide. Native to South Asia.
Mustela erminea	Mammal	Beringian ermine, ermine, Eurasian ermine, Eurasian stoat, short-tailed weasel, stoat	Invasive in New Zealand. Native to the temperate Northern Hemisphere.
Myocastor coypus	Mammal	Coypu, nutria	Invasive in North America, Europe, and Asia. Native to South America.
Myrica faya (syn. Morella faya) (Note: The ISSG lists it as Morella faya. The ISSG booklet gives it as Myrica faya.)	Shrub	Candleberry myrtle, faya bayberry, fayatree, fire tree, firebush	Invasive in Hawaii, New Zealand, and Australia. native to the Azores, Madeira Islands, and the Canary Islands.
Mytilus galloprovincialis	Mollusc	Bay mussel, blue mussel, Mediterranean mussel	Invasive worldwide. Native to the Mediterranean Coast and the Black Sea.
Oncorhynchus mykiss	Fish	Baja California rainbow trout, coast angel trout, coast rainbow trout, coast range trout, hardhead, Kamchatka steelhead, Kamchatka trout, Kamloops, Kamloops trout, lord-fish, rainbow trout, redband, redband trout, salmon trout, silver trout, steelhead, steelhead trout, summer salmon	Invasive worldwide. Native to cold-water tributaries of the Pacific Ocean in Asia and North America.
Ophiostoma ulmi sensu lato (Note: "Sensu lato" means "in the broad sense".)	Fungus	Dutch elm disease	Caused destructive pandemics in Europe and North America. Native to Asia.
Opuntia stricta	Shrub	Common prickly pear, Araluen pear, Australian pest pear, common pest pear, erect prickly pear, gayndah pear, shell mound pricklypear, sour prickly pear, spiny pest pear	Invasive in South Africa and Australia. Native to Neotropics.
Oreochromis mossambicus	Fish	Common tilapia, Java tilapia, kurper bream, Mozambique cichlid, Mozambique mouth-breeder, Mozambique mouthbrooder, Mozambique tilapia	Invasive worldwide. Native to Southeast Africa.
Oryctolagus cuniculus	Mammal	European rabbit, wild rabbit	Invasive in Australia and New Zealand. Native to Southwestern Europe.
Pheidole megacephala	Insect	Big-headed ant, coastal brown ant (Note: The ISSG list includes the name "brown house ant", which can be Doleromyrma darwiniana or Pheidole capensis)	Invasive in Australia, New Zealand, and Florida. Native to Southern Africa.
Phytophthora cinnamomi	Pseudo-fungus	Cinnamon fungus, green fruit rot, heart rot, phytophthora root rot, seedling blight, stem canker, wildflower dieback	Invasive in Africa, Australia, Italy and North America.
Pinus pinaster	Tree	Cluster pine, maritime pine	Invasive in South Africa and New Zealand. Native to the Mediterranean Basin.
Plasmodium relictum	Protozoan	Avian malaria (Note: Avian malaria can be caused by other Plasmodium species, as well as some Hemoproteus species, but P. relictum is the most significant cause.)	Highly invasive in Hawaii; implicated in several bird extinctions
Platydemus manokwari	Flatworm	New Guinea flatworm, snail-eating flatworm	Invasive in Pacific islands. Native to New Guinea.
Pomacea canaliculata	Mollusc	Apple snail, channeled apple snail, golden apple snail, golden kuhol, miracle snail	Invasive in Southeast Asia and Hawaii. Rice crop pest. Native to South America.
Pontederia crassipes (syn. Eichhornia crassipes) (Note: The ISSG lists it as Eichhornia crassipes.)	Aquatic plant	Common water hyacinth, eichhornia, floating water hyacinth, water orchid	Invasive worldwide. Native to South America.
Potamocorbula amurensis	Mollusc	Amur River clam, Amur River corbula, Asian bivalve, Asian clam, brackish-water corbula, Chinese clam, marine clam	Invasive in San Francisco Bay (United States). Native to coasts of China, Japan, Korea, and Siberia.
Prosopis glandulosa	Tree	Honey mesquite, Texas mesquite	Invasive in Africa and Australia. Native to Aridoamerica.
Psidium cattleyanum (Note: The ISSG lists it as Psidium cattleianum.)	Shrub	Cattley guava, cherry guava, strawberry guava	Highly invasive in Mauritius and Hawaii. Native to Brazil.
Pueraria montana var. lobata	Vine	East Asian arrowroot, Japanese arrowroot, kudzu, kudzu vine	Native to Southeast and East Asia. Invasive in several other parts of the world, especially the southeastern United States.
Pycnonotus cafer	Bird	Red-vented bulbul	Invasive in many Pacific islands. Native to South and Southeast Asia.
Rattus rattus	Mammal	Black rat, European house rat, roof rat, ship rat (Note: The ISSG list includes the name "bush rat", which is various other species.)	Invasive worldwide; implicated in numerous mammalian, reptilian and bird extinctions. Native to Central Asia.
Reynoutria japonica (syns. Fallopia japonica, Polygonum cuspidatum) (Note: The ISSG lists it as Polygonum cuspidatum. The ISSG booklet gives it as Fallopia japonica.)	Shrub	Asian knotweed, crimson beauty, donkey rhubarb, fleeceflower, German sausage, Japanese bamboo, Japanese fleece flower, Japanese knotweed, Japanese polygonum, kontiki bamboo, Mexican bamboo, pea-shooter plant, reynoutria fleece flower, sally rhubarb	Invasive in Europe, New Zealand, and North America. Native to Japan.
Rhinella marina (Note: The ISSG booklet gives it as Bufo marinus.)	Amphibian	Bufo toad, bullfrog, cane toad, giant American toad, giant neotropical toad, giant toad, marine toad, Suriname toad	Invasive in Australia, Melanesia, the Pacific, Philippines, Taiwan, Florida, and the West Indies. Native to South America and Central America.
Rubus ellipticus	Shrub	Asian wild raspberry, broad-leafed bramble, Ceylon blackberry, golden evergreen raspberry, Molucca berry, Molucca bramble, Molucca raspberry, robust blackberry, wild blackberry, wild raspberry, yellow Himalayan raspberry	Invasive in Hawaii. Native to South Asia.
Salmo trutta	Fish	Blacktail, brook trout, brown trout, finnock, Galway sea trout, herling, lake trout, orange fin, Orkney sea trout, salmon trout, sea trout, trout, whitling	Invasive worldwide. Native to Europe, Central Asia, and the Atlas Mountains of Africa.
Salvinia molesta (Note: This replaced † rinderpest virus after that was eradicated in 2011.)	Aquatic plant	Giant salvinia, kariba weed	Invasive worldwide.
Schinus terebinthifolia (Note: The ISSG lists it as Schinus terebinthifolius.)	Tree	Brazilian holly, Brazilian pepper, Brazilian pepper tree, Christmas berry, Florida holly, Mexican pepper	Invasive in North America, Australia, the West Indies, Pacific Islands. Native to South America.
Sciurus carolinensis	Mammal	Eastern gray squirrel, gray squirrel, grey squirrel	Introduced to the British Isles, Italy, and South Africa. Native to eastern North America.
Solenopsis invicta	Insect	Red fire ant, red imported fire ant, RIFA	Invasive in Australia, New Zealand, Southeast Asia, the Caribbean, and the United States. Native to tropical South America.
Spathodea campanulata	Tree	African tulip tree, fireball, flame of the forest, fountain tree, Indian cedar, Santo Domingo mahogany	Invasive in Pacific Islands. Native to West Africa.
Sphagneticola trilobata	Herb	Creeping ox-eye, Singapore daisy, trailing daisy, wedelia	Invasive worldwide. Native to Central America.
Sporobolus anglicus (syn. Spartina anglica) (Note: The ISSG lists it as Spartina anglica.)	Grass	Common cord grass, cordgrass, rice cord grass, rice grass, spartina, Townsend's grass	Invasive in New Zealand.
Sturnus vulgaris	Bird	Common starling, English starling, European starling	Native to Eurasia. Invasive in North America, Australia, and New Zealand.
Sus scrofa	Mammal	Eurasian wild pig, wild boar (Note: The ISSG list equates it with "feral pig".)	Invasive worldwide. Native to North Africa, Asia, and Europe.
Tamarix ramosissima	Shrub	Salt cedar, tamarisk	Invasive in the western United States and northern Mexico. Native to Eurasia.
Trachemys scripta elegans	Reptile	Red-eared slider, red-eared slider terrapin, slider turtle	Invasive worldwide. Native to southeastern North America.
Trichosurus vulpecula	Mammal	Common brushtail possum	Invasive species in New Zealand. Native to Australia.
Trogoderma granarium	Insect	Cabinet beetle, Khapra beetle	Invasive worldwide. Native to South Asia.
Ulex europaeus	Shrub	Gorse, Irish furze, whin	Invasive in New Zealand, Hawaii, and the Western United States. Native to Western Europe and parts of Asia.
Undaria pinnatifida	Seaweed	Apron-ribbon vegetable, Asian kelp, Japanese kelp, sea mustard, wakame	Invasive in New Zealand, the United States, Western Europe, Argentina, Australia, and Mexico. Native to Japan.
Urva auropunctata (syn. Herpestes auropunctatus) (Note: The ISSG lists it as Herpestes javanicus, which is now Urva javanica "Javan mongoose", but then mostly describes the "small Indian mongoose".)	Mammal	Small Indian mongoose	Invasive on the northeast coast of South America, Croatia, Amami Ōshima, Fiji, Hawaii, and the West Indies; implicated in several mammal, bird and reptile extinctions. Native to South and Southeast Asia.
Vespula vulgaris	Insect	Common wasp, common European yellowjacket, European Wasp	Invasive in New Zealand, Australia, Chile, and Argentina. Native to the temperate Northern Hemisphere (Palearctic).
Vulpes vulpes	Mammal	Red fox, black or silver fox variation, cross fox variation	Invasive in Australia. Native to the Northern Hemisphere.
Wasmannia auropunctata	Insect	Cocoa tree-ant, electric ant, little fire ant, little introduced fire ant, little red fire ant, small fire ant, West Indian stinging ant	Invasive in the Pacific, the West Indies, and parts of Central Africa. Native to Central and South America.
