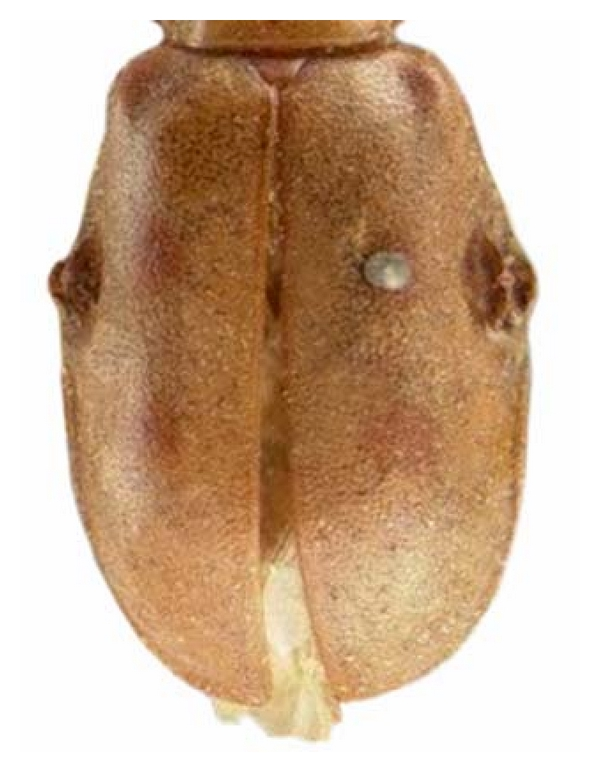
- Malacorhinus foveipennis

Scientific classification
- Kingdom: Animalia
- Phylum: Arthropoda
- Clade: Pancrustacea
- Class: Insecta
- Order: Coleoptera
- Suborder: Polyphaga
- Infraorder: Cucujiformia
- Family: Chrysomelidae
- Subfamily: Galerucinae
- Tribe: Metacyclini
- Genus: Malacorhinus; Jacoby, 1887

= Malacorhinus =

Genus of beetles

Malacorhinus is a genus of skeletonizing leaf beetles in the family Chrysomelidae. There are about 30 described species in Malacorhinus. They are found in North America and the Neotropics.

In Australia, the species Malacorhinus irregularis was introduced to Northern Territory in 2000 as a biological control agent against the weed Mimosa pigra.

== Species ==
These 10 species belong to the genus Malacorhinus:

- Malacorhinus acaciae (Schaeffer, 1906)
- Malacorhinus apicalis Jacoby, 1887
- Malacorhinus biplagiatus Jacoby, 1887
- Malacorhinus decempunctatus Jacoby, 1887
- Malacorhinus dilaticornis Jacoby, 1887
- Malacorhinus exclamationis Jacoby, 1892
- Malacorhinus foveipennis (Jacoby, 1879)
- Malacorhinus irregularis (Jacoby, 1887)
- Malacorhinus knullorum Wilcox, 1951
- Malacorhinus tilghmani Mignot, 1970 (replacement name for Malacorhinus tripunctatus (Jacoby, 1879))
