= GISD =

GISD is an acronym that may refer to:

- Independent School Districts in Texas - G
- Global Invasive Species Database
