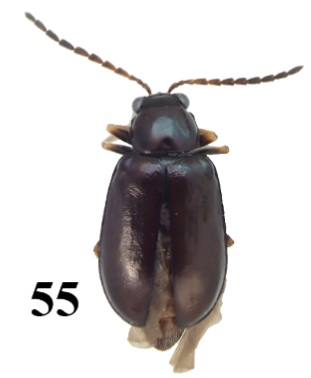

Scientific classification
- Kingdom: Animalia
- Phylum: Arthropoda
- Class: Insecta
- Order: Coleoptera
- Suborder: Polyphaga
- Infraorder: Cucujiformia
- Family: Chrysomelidae
- Genus: Zepherina
- Species: Z. variegata

Binomial name
- Zepherina variegata (Weise, 1921)

Synonyms
- Uroplata variegata Weise, 1921

= Zepherina variegata =

Species of beetle

Zepherina variegata is a species of beetle of the family Chrysomelidae. It is found in Paraguay.
