= Metacyclini =

Scientific classification
- Kingdom: Animalia
- Phylum: Arthropoda
- Clade: Pancrustacea
- Class: Insecta
- Order: Coleoptera
- Suborder: Polyphaga
- Infraorder: Cucujiformia
- Family: Chrysomelidae
- Subfamily: Galerucinae
- Tribe: Metacyclini; Chapuis, 1875

Synonyms
- Metacyclites Chapuis, 1875: 212; Metacyclini Leng, 1920; Stictocemites Laboissière, 1922; Exorini Wilcox, 1965

Tribe of beetles

Metacyclini is a tribe of beetles in the family Chrysomelidae.

== Genera ==
The genera below belong to the tribe Metacyclini:

- Agelacida
- Antsianaka
- Byblitea
- Chapuisia
- Chthoneis
- Eleona
- Elyces
- Estcourtiana
- Eurycycla
- Exora
- Exosomella
- Exosomorpha
- Galerusoma
- Glaucorhabda
- Goudotina
- Hecataeus
- Ikopista
- Luperolophus
- Luperososia
- Maevatanania
- Malacorhinus
- Masurius
- Metacycla
- Metopoedema
- Mimastroides
- Nyctiplanctus
- Palaeophylia
- Pseudoides
- Pyesexora
- Pyesia
- Sesselia
- Sonyadora
- Stictocema
- Sumatrasia
- Trigonexora
- Uaupesia
- Zepherina
