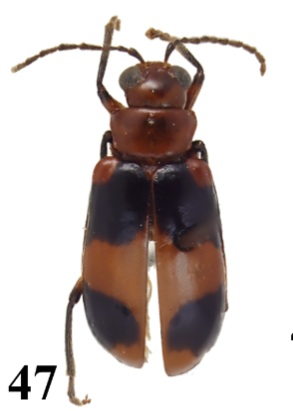

Scientific classification
- Kingdom: Animalia
- Phylum: Arthropoda
- Clade: Pancrustacea
- Class: Insecta
- Order: Coleoptera
- Suborder: Polyphaga
- Infraorder: Cucujiformia
- Family: Chrysomelidae
- Genus: Nyctiplanctus
- Species: N. farri

Binomial name
- Nyctiplanctus farri Blake, 1963

= Nyctiplanctus farri =

Species of beetle

Nyctiplanctus farri is a species of beetle of the family Chrysomelidae. It is found in Jamaica.

== Description ==
Adults reach a length of about 5-7.5 mm. Adults are reddish brown, while the elytron is piceous with a reddish brown spot and a reddish brown band.
