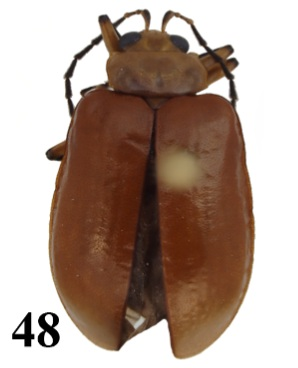

Scientific classification
- Kingdom: Animalia
- Phylum: Arthropoda
- Clade: Pancrustacea
- Class: Insecta
- Order: Coleoptera
- Suborder: Polyphaga
- Infraorder: Cucujiformia
- Family: Chrysomelidae
- Genus: Nyctiplanctus
- Species: N. ferrugineus

Binomial name
- Nyctiplanctus ferrugineus (Blake, 1963)

Synonyms
- Chthoneis ferruginea Blake, 1963; Nyctiplanctus ferruginea

= Nyctiplanctus ferrugineus =

Species of beetle

Nyctiplanctus ferrugineus is a species of beetle of the family Chrysomelidae. It is found on Hispaniola.

== Description ==
Adults reach a length of about 7 mm. The elytron is reddish brown, while the antennae, tibiae and tarsi are piceous.
