= Nyctiplanctus jamaicensis =

Scientific classification
- Kingdom: Animalia
- Phylum: Arthropoda
- Clade: Pancrustacea
- Class: Insecta
- Order: Coleoptera
- Suborder: Polyphaga
- Infraorder: Cucujiformia
- Family: Chrysomelidae
- Genus: Nyctiplanctus
- Species: N. jamaicensis

Binomial name
- Nyctiplanctus jamaicensis Blake, 1963

Species of beetle

Nyctiplanctus jamaicensis is a species of beetle of the family Chrysomelidae. It is found in Jamaica.

== Description ==
Adults reach a length of about 4–5 mm. The elytron is dark piceous with a reddish brown fascia and reddish brown apex.
