= Antsianaka =

Scientific classification
- Kingdom: Animalia
- Phylum: Arthropoda
- Clade: Pancrustacea
- Class: Insecta
- Order: Coleoptera
- Suborder: Polyphaga
- Infraorder: Cucujiformia
- Family: Chrysomelidae
- Subfamily: Galerucinae
- Tribe: Metacyclini
- Genus: Antsianaka; Duvivier, 1891

Genus of leaf beetles

Antsianaka is a genus of beetles belonging to the family Chrysomelidae.

== Species ==
- Antsianaka cerambycina Bechyne, 1964
- Antsianaka discophora Bechyne, 1964
- Antsianaka elegantula Jacoby, 1892
- Antsianaka oxyops Fairmaire, 1901
- Antsianaka perrieri Fairmaire, 1901
- Antsianaka prasinella Fairmaire, 1898
- Antsianaka pulchella Duvivier, 1891
- Antsianaka rufipennis Duvivier, 1891
- Antsianaka rugipennis Fairmaire, 1901
- Antsianaka viridis Jacoby, 1892
