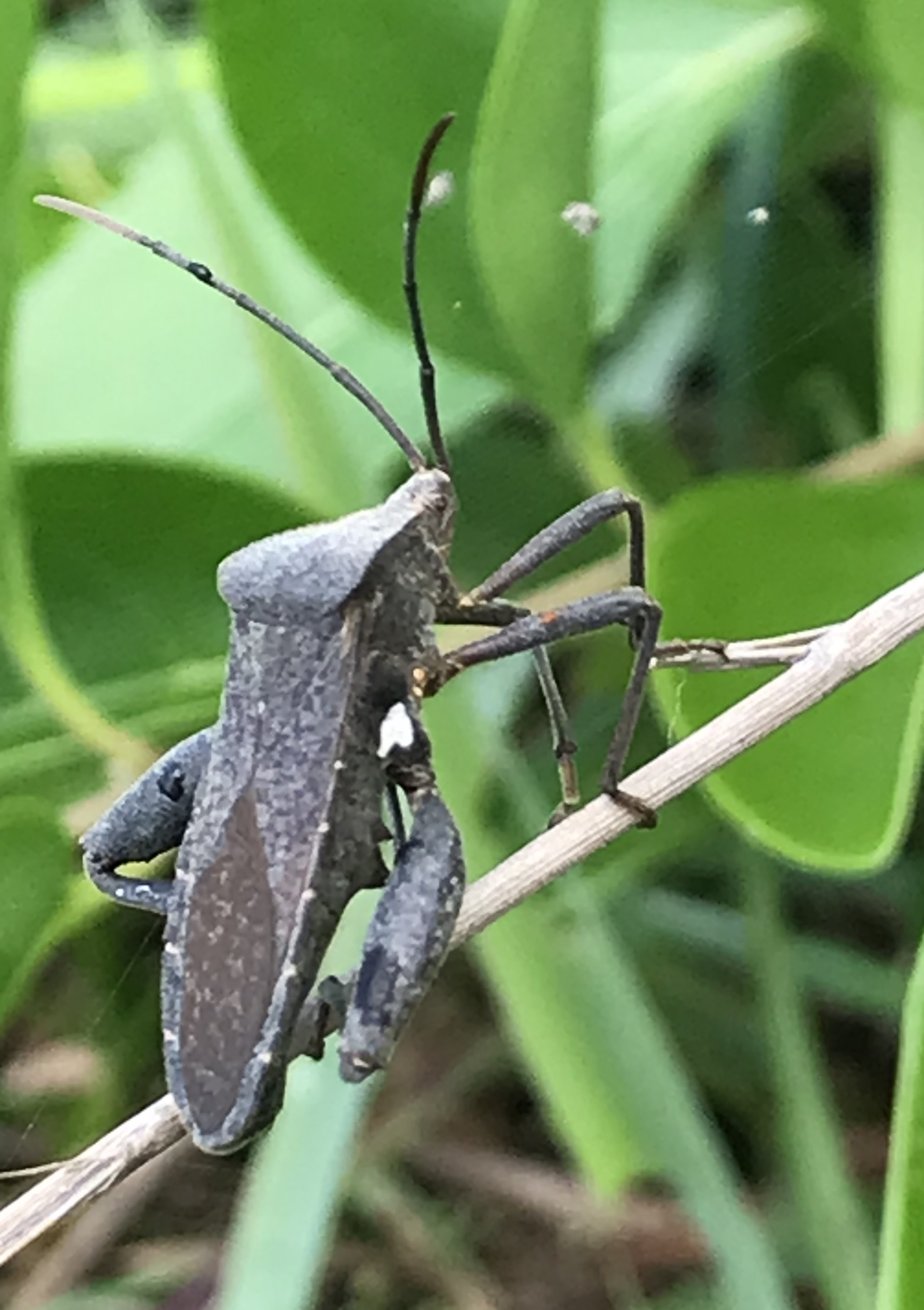
- M. tenebrosa from Hong Kong

Scientific classification
- Domain: Eukaryota
- Kingdom: Animalia
- Phylum: Arthropoda
- Class: Insecta
- Order: Hemiptera
- Suborder: Heteroptera
- Family: Coreidae
- Subfamily: Coreinae
- Tribe: Mictini
- Genus: Mictis
- Species: M. tenebrosa

Binomial name
- Mictis tenebrosa (Fabricius, 1787)

= Mictis tenebrosa =

Species of true bug

Mictis tenebrosa (Heteroptera: Coreidae) is a species of hemipteran bug found in East and South East Asia. It can also be found in parts of southern Africa. In China both the nymphs and adults are known to be edible.

== Description ==
The species' colour is brown with very large hind legs.
