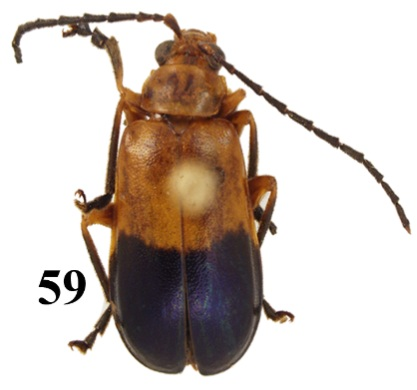
- Byblitea

Scientific classification
- Kingdom: Animalia
- Phylum: Arthropoda
- Clade: Pancrustacea
- Class: Insecta
- Order: Coleoptera
- Suborder: Polyphaga
- Infraorder: Cucujiformia
- Family: Chrysomelidae
- Subfamily: Galerucinae
- Tribe: Metacyclini
- Genus: Byblitea; Baly, 1864

= Byblitea =

Genus of leaf beetles

Byblitea is a genus of beetles belonging to the family Chrysomelidae.

== Species ==
- Byblitea cyaneomaculata (Bowditch, 1925)
- Byblitea deyrollei Baly, 1864
- Byblitea donckieri (Bowditch, 1925)
- Byblitea foveicollis (Bowditch, 1925)
- Byblitea jansoni (Jacoby, 1878)
- Byblitea rustica (Weise, 1924)
- Byblitea suffusa (Baly, 1886)
