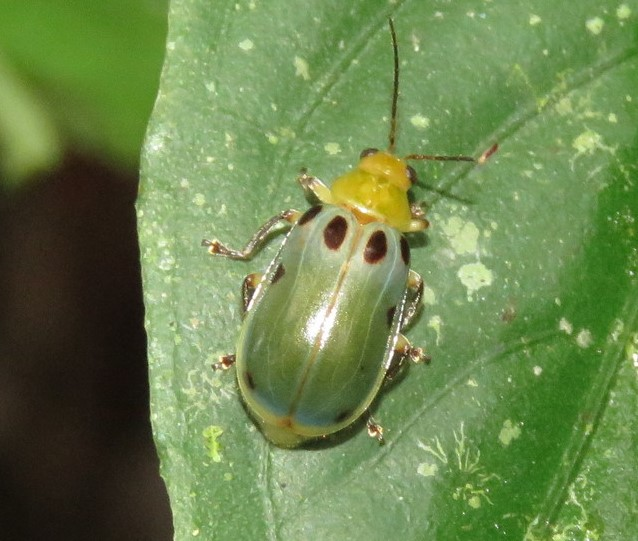

Scientific classification
- Kingdom: Animalia
- Phylum: Arthropoda
- Clade: Pancrustacea
- Class: Insecta
- Order: Coleoptera
- Suborder: Polyphaga
- Infraorder: Cucujiformia
- Family: Chrysomelidae
- Genus: Exora
- Species: E. obsoleta

Binomial name
- Exora obsoleta (Fabricius, 1801)

Synonyms
- Crioceris obsoleta Fabricius, 1801; Malacosoma obsoleta

= Exora obsoleta =

Species of beetle

Exora obsoleta is a species of beetle of the family Chrysomelidae. It is found in Mexico, Guyana and Ecuador.
