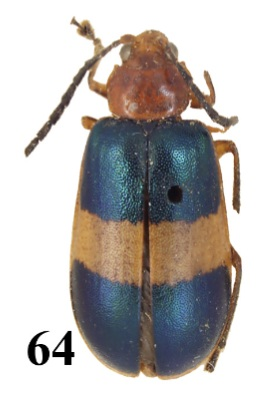

Scientific classification
- Kingdom: Animalia
- Phylum: Arthropoda
- Clade: Pancrustacea
- Class: Insecta
- Order: Coleoptera
- Suborder: Polyphaga
- Infraorder: Cucujiformia
- Family: Chrysomelidae
- Genus: Pyesia
- Species: P. laticornis

Binomial name
- Pyesia laticornis (Germar, 1823)

Synonyms
- Galeruca laticornis Germar, 1823

= Pyesia laticornis =

Species of beetle

Pyesia laticornis is a species of beetle of the family Chrysomelidae. It is found in Brazil.
