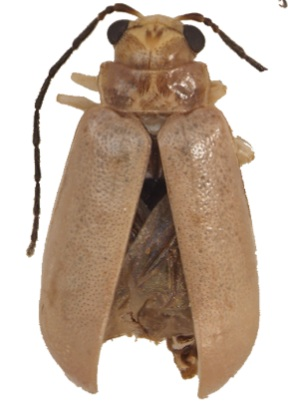

Scientific classification
- Kingdom: Animalia
- Phylum: Arthropoda
- Class: Insecta
- Order: Coleoptera
- Suborder: Polyphaga
- Infraorder: Cucujiformia
- Family: Chrysomelidae
- Genus: Zepherina
- Species: Z. brevicollis

Binomial name
- Zepherina brevicollis (Weise, 1921)

= Zepherina brevicollis =

Species of beetle

Zepherina brevicollis is a species of beetle of the family Chrysomelidae. It is found in Peru.
