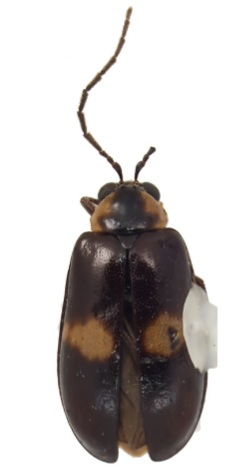

Scientific classification
- Kingdom: Animalia
- Phylum: Arthropoda
- Clade: Pancrustacea
- Class: Insecta
- Order: Coleoptera
- Suborder: Polyphaga
- Infraorder: Cucujiformia
- Family: Chrysomelidae
- Subfamily: Galerucinae
- Tribe: Metacyclini
- Genus: Uaupesia; Bechyné, 1957

= Uaupesia =

Genus of leaf beetles

Uaupesia is a genus of beetles belonging to the family Chrysomelidae.

== Species ==
- Uaupesia amazona (Weise, 1921)
- Uaupesia brevicollis (Bechyne, 1958)
- Uaupesia buckleyi (Bowditch, 1925)
- Uaupesia maculicollis (Bowditch, 1925)
- Uaupesia nigriceps (Weise, 1921)
- Uaupesia romani Bechyne, 1958
- Uaupesia tijucana Bechyne, 1958
- Uaupesia weisei Wilcox, 1971
