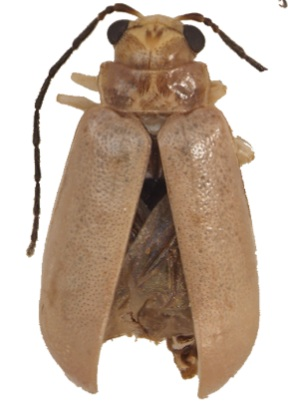
- Zepherina

Scientific classification
- Kingdom: Animalia
- Phylum: Arthropoda
- Clade: Pancrustacea
- Class: Insecta
- Order: Coleoptera
- Suborder: Polyphaga
- Infraorder: Cucujiformia
- Family: Chrysomelidae
- Subfamily: Galerucinae
- Tribe: Metacyclini
- Genus: Zepherina; Bechyné, 1958

= Zepherina =

Genus of leaf beetles

Zepherina is a genus of beetles belonging to the family Chrysomelidae.

== Species ==
- Zepherina acanthonychina
- Zepherina atroplagiata
- Zepherina bella
- Zepherina beniensis
- Zepherina blumenensis
- Zepherina brasiliensis
- Zepherina brevicollis
- Zepherina bucki
- Zepherina callangensis
- Zepherina camilla
- Zepherina carbonera
- Zepherina clermonti
- Zepherina defensa
- Zepherina dichroa
- Zepherina dispensa
- Zepherina dubia
- Zepherina flava
- Zepherina guttata
- Zepherina iguassuana
- Zepherina luteovittata
- Zepherina maculata
- Zepherina marginata
- Zepherina muriensis
- Zepherina newtoni
- Zepherina nigromaculata
- Zepherina ocoteae
- Zepherina octoguttata
- Zepherina pallida
- Zepherina parvicollis
- Zepherina phenricina
- Zepherina pulchra
- Zepherina salchisa
- Zepherina selecta
- Zepherina similis
- Zepherina systenoides
- Zepherina taperinha
- Zepherina tiarensis
- Zepherina tippmanni
- Zepherina trinidadensis
- Zepherina utingensis
- Zepherina variegata
- Zepherina virgilia
- Zepherina xanthopus
