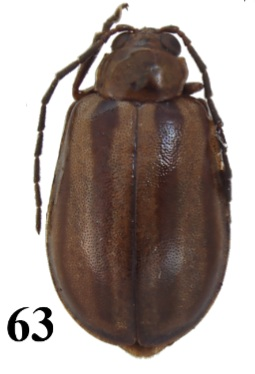

Scientific classification
- Kingdom: Animalia
- Phylum: Arthropoda
- Clade: Pancrustacea
- Class: Insecta
- Order: Coleoptera
- Suborder: Polyphaga
- Infraorder: Cucujiformia
- Family: Chrysomelidae
- Subfamily: Galerucinae
- Tribe: Metacyclini
- Genus: Pyesexora; Viswajyothi & Clark, 2022

= Pyesexora =

Genus of leaf beetles

Pyesexora is a genus of beetles belonging to the family Chrysomelidae.

== Species ==
- Pyesexora detrita (Fabricius, 1801)
- Pyesexora elytropleuralis (Bechyné, 1958)
