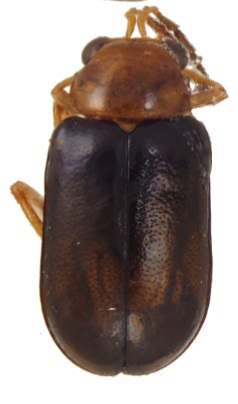

Scientific classification
- Kingdom: Animalia
- Phylum: Arthropoda
- Class: Insecta
- Order: Coleoptera
- Suborder: Polyphaga
- Infraorder: Cucujiformia
- Family: Chrysomelidae
- Genus: Zepherina
- Species: Z. trinidadensis

Binomial name
- Zepherina trinidadensis (Weise, 1929)

= Zepherina trinidadensis =

Species of beetle

Zepherina trinidadensis is a species of beetle of the family Chrysomelidae. It is found in Trinidad and Tobago.
