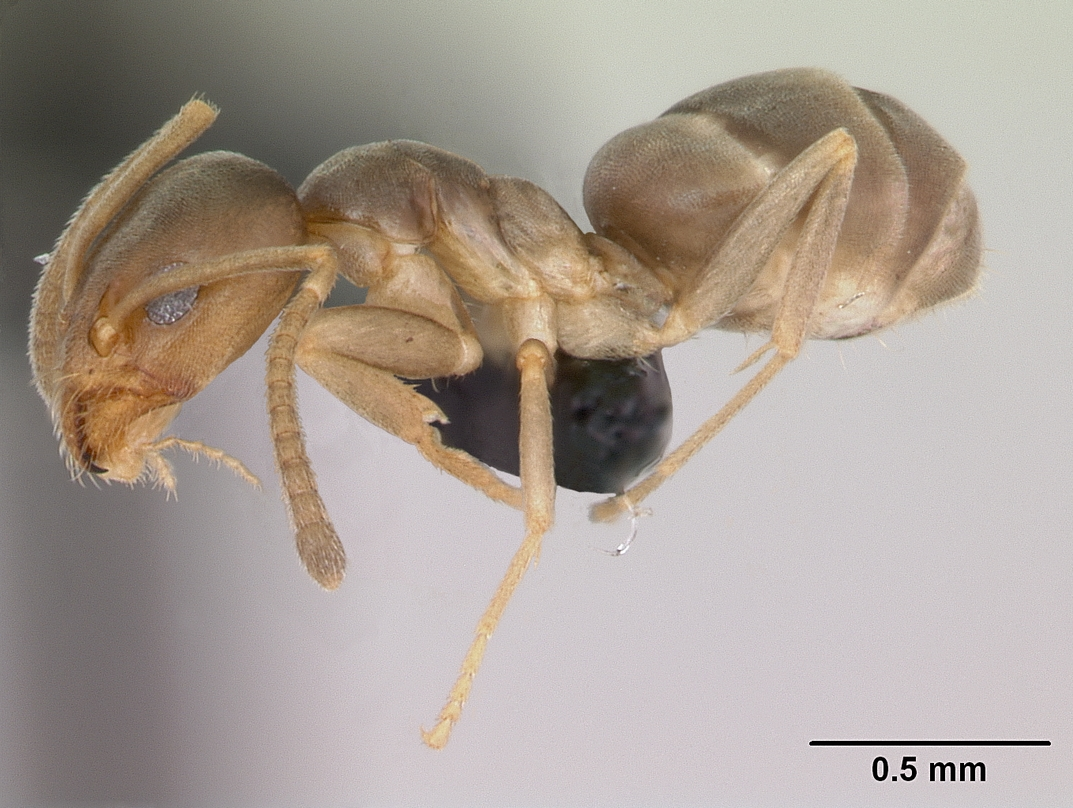
- D. darwiniana worker

Scientific classification
- Kingdom: Animalia
- Phylum: Arthropoda
- Class: Insecta
- Order: Hymenoptera
- Family: Formicidae
- Subfamily: Dolichoderinae
- Tribe: Leptomyrmecini
- Genus: Doleromyrma; Forel, 1907

Type species
- Tapinoma darwinianum

Diversity
- 2 species

= Doleromyrma =

Genus of ants

Doleromyrma is a genus of ants in the subfamily Dolichoderinae. The genus is native to Australia, where the ants nest in soil, or under stones or logs.

== Species ==
- Doleromyrma darwiniana (Forel, 1907) – native to Australia, and introduced to New Zealand
  - Doleromyrma darwiniana fida (Forel, 1907)
  - Doleromyrma darwiniana leae (Forel, 1913)
- Doleromyrma rottnestensis (Wheeler, 1934)
