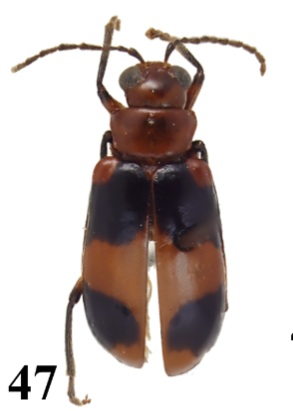
- Nyctiplanctus

Scientific classification
- Kingdom: Animalia
- Phylum: Arthropoda
- Clade: Pancrustacea
- Class: Insecta
- Order: Coleoptera
- Suborder: Polyphaga
- Infraorder: Cucujiformia
- Family: Chrysomelidae
- Subfamily: Galerucinae
- Tribe: Metacyclini
- Genus: Nyctiplanctus; Blake, 1963

= Nyctiplanctus =

Genus of leaf beetles

Nyctiplanctus is a genus of beetles belonging to the family Chrysomelidae.

== Species ==
- Nyctiplanctus farri Blake, 1963
- Nyctiplanctus ferrugineus (Blake, 1963)
- Nyctiplanctus hispaniolae (Blake, 1948)
- Nyctiplanctus insulana (Blake, 1946)
- Nyctiplanctus jamaicensis Blake, 1963
- Nyctiplanctus loricata (Suffrian, 1867)
- Nyctiplanctus vittata (Blake, 1959)
