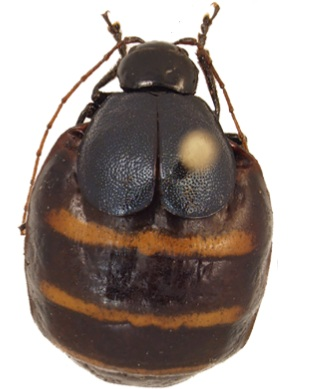
- Metacycla sallei

Scientific classification
- Kingdom: Animalia
- Phylum: Arthropoda
- Clade: Pancrustacea
- Class: Insecta
- Order: Coleoptera
- Suborder: Polyphaga
- Infraorder: Cucujiformia
- Family: Chrysomelidae
- Subfamily: Galerucinae
- Tribe: Metacyclini
- Genus: Metacycla; Baly, 1861

Synonyms
- Gastrogyna LeConte, 1865

= Metacycla =

Genus of leaf beetles

Metacycla is a genus of beetles belonging to the family Chrysomelidae.

== Species ==
- Metacycla caeruleipennis Jacoby, 1888
- Metacycla insolita (LeConte, 1861)
- Metacycla marginata Chapuis, 1875
- Metacycla rugipennis Jacoby, 1892
- Metacycla sallei Baly, 1861
