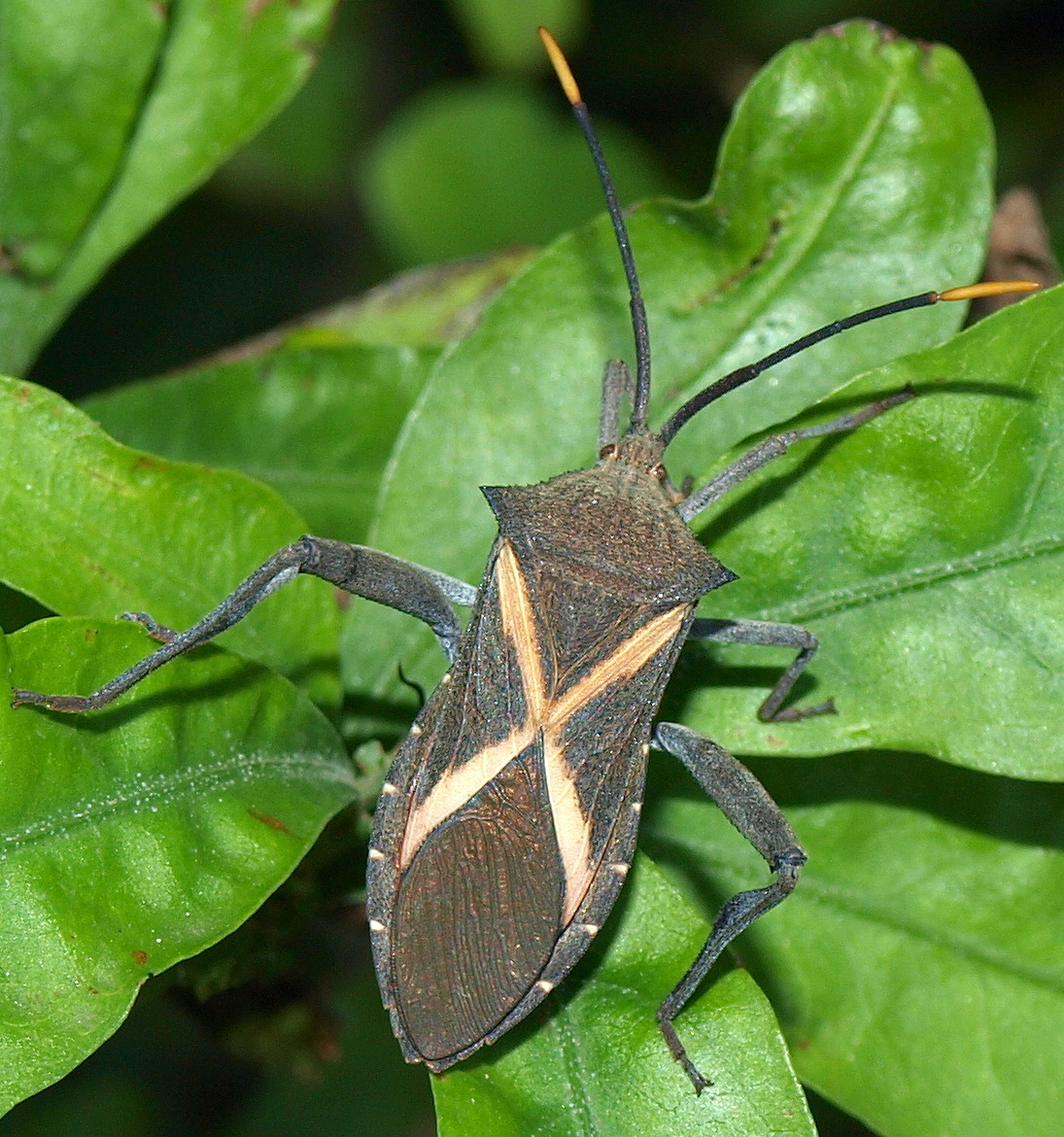

Scientific classification
- Domain: Eukaryota
- Kingdom: Animalia
- Phylum: Arthropoda
- Class: Insecta
- Order: Hemiptera
- Suborder: Heteroptera
- Family: Coreidae
- Subfamily: Coreinae
- Tribe: Mictini
- Genus: Mictis
- Species: M. profana

Binomial name
- Mictis profana (Fabricius, 1803)

Synonyms
- Anisoscelis abdominalis Guérin-Méneville; Mictis crucifera Leach; Mictis crux Dalla; Mictis symbolica Dallas

= Mictis profana =

Species of true bug

Mictis profana is a species of insect in the family Coreidae known by the common names crusader bug and holy cross bug. It is distributed in Australia, Indonesia, and the Indo-Pacific.

The insect can be seen in most habitat types, from urban areas to the coastal heath, except for the desert.

== Description ==
The adult is 20–25 mm long and 7–10 mm wide, stout, and grey to brown with a clear saltire in cream or yellow on its back. The legs are long and the shoulders of the pronotum project into short spines in adults and older nymphs. The hindmost legs are much thicker than the other legs, and the hind femur has inner rows of fine teeth and one preapical spine. The hindmost legs are shorter and much swollen in the male. The hind tibia are inwardly lamellate in about middle third; less so in the male, which also has a distinct spine on the lamellate area. Later instar nymphs have a pair of orange spots in the middle of the upper surface of abdomen, and wing pads in later instars are marked with orange.

The species is polyphagous, and has been recorded feeding on a variety of native and introduced plants such as eucalypts, wattles, orchard trees such as citrus, and cultivated crops including grape, pawpaw, cowpea, tomato, beans, and green gram.

Although it is a minor pest of citrus and wattles it is considered a helpful biological control agent against the weed Mimosa pigra.
