= Chapuisia =

Scientific classification
- Kingdom: Animalia
- Phylum: Arthropoda
- Clade: Pancrustacea
- Class: Insecta
- Order: Coleoptera
- Suborder: Polyphaga
- Infraorder: Cucujiformia
- Family: Chrysomelidae
- Subfamily: Galerucinae
- Tribe: Metacyclini
- Genus: Chapuisia; Duvivier, 1885

Genus of leaf beetles

Chapuisia is a genus of beetles belonging to the family Chrysomelidae.

== Species ==
- Chapuisia alluaudi (Laboissiere, 1920)
- Chapuisia annulicornis (Laboissiere, 1920)
- Chapuisia basalis Jacoby, 1903
- Chapuisia bifasciata (Jacoby, 1899)
- Chapuisia carinata Laboissiere, 1939
- Chapuisia castaneipennis Laboissiere, 1939
- Chapuisia collaris Laboissiere, 1940
- Chapuisia dilaticornis (Jacoby, 1906)
- Chapuisia dilutipes (Jacoby, 1906)
- Chapuisia ellenbergeri Laboissiere, 1924
- Chapuisia flavicornis (Jacoby, 1903)
- Chapuisia fossulata (Chapius, 1879)
- Chapuisia foveolata (Laboissiere, 1921)
- Chapuisia fulva Bryant, 1952
- Chapuisia guillodi Laboissiere, 1939
- Chapuisia humeralis (Laboissiere, 1920)
- Chapuisia inconspicua (Jacoby, 1899)
- Chapuisia iricolor Laboissiere, 1940
- Chapuisia kamerunensis (Weise, 1912)
- Chapuisia lesnei (Laboissiere, 1931)
- Chapuisia maculata (Weise, 1909)
- Chapuisia maculicollis Weise, 1927
- Chapuisia mozambica (Laboissiere, 1931)
- Chapuisia multicolor Laboissiere, 1940
- Chapuisia natalensis (Jacoby, 1899)
- Chapuisia nigritarsis (Laboissiere, 1920)
- Chapuisia nigriventris (Laboissiere, 1920)
- Chapuisia nigrofemorata (Bryant, 1958)
- Chapuisia nitida (Weise, 1912)
- Chapuisia ocellata Laboissiere, 1940
- Chapuisia ornata (Reiche, 1847)
- Chapuisia pallida (Jacoby, 1897)
- Chapuisia piceipes (Jacoby, 1899)
- Chapuisia platicornis Laboissiere, 1939
- Chapuisia reflecta Laboissiere, 1939
- Chapuisia rugosa (Laboissiere, 1921)
- Chapuisia rugulipennis (Weise, 1921)
- Chapuisia scutellaris Weise, 1927
- Chapuisia scutellata (Jacoby, 1897)
- Chapuisia similis (Laboissiere, 1921)
- Chapuisia sjoestedti Jacoby, 1903
- Chapuisia suahelorum (Weise, 1912)
- Chapuisia subconnectens (Jacoby, 1906)
- Chapuisia subrugosa (Jacoby, 1906)
- Chapuisia terminata (Jacoby, 1899)
- Chapuisia tibalis Laboissiere, 1939
- Chapuisia usambarica (Weise, 1902)
- Chapuisia variabilis Laboissiere, 1939
- Chapuisia variceps Laboissiere, 1940
- Chapuisia vicina Laboissiere, 1939
- Chapuisia viridiaurea (Laboissiere, 1920)
