= Malacorhinus acaciae =

Scientific classification
- Kingdom: Animalia
- Phylum: Arthropoda
- Clade: Pancrustacea
- Class: Insecta
- Order: Coleoptera
- Suborder: Polyphaga
- Infraorder: Cucujiformia
- Family: Chrysomelidae
- Genus: Malacorhinus
- Species: M. acaciae

Binomial name
- Malacorhinus acaciae (Schaeffer, 1906)

Species of beetle

Malacorhinus acaciae is a species of skeletonizing leaf beetle in the family Chrysomelidae. It is found in North America.
