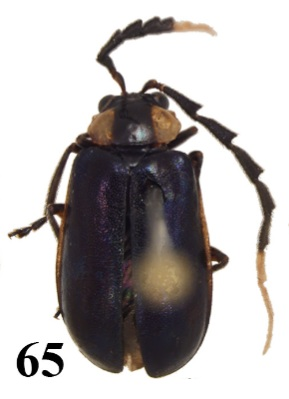

Scientific classification
- Kingdom: Animalia
- Phylum: Arthropoda
- Clade: Pancrustacea
- Class: Insecta
- Order: Coleoptera
- Suborder: Polyphaga
- Infraorder: Cucujiformia
- Family: Chrysomelidae
- Genus: Chthoneis
- Species: C. marginicollis

Binomial name
- Chthoneis marginicollis Jacoby, 1881

= Chthoneis marginicollis =

Species of beetle

Chthoneis marginicollis is a species of beetle of the family Chrysomelidae. It is found in Peru.
