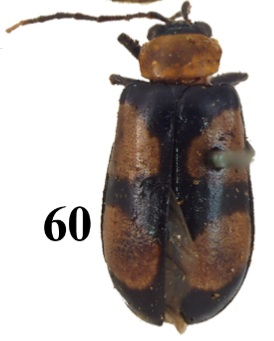

Scientific classification
- Kingdom: Animalia
- Phylum: Arthropoda
- Clade: Pancrustacea
- Class: Insecta
- Order: Coleoptera
- Suborder: Polyphaga
- Infraorder: Cucujiformia
- Family: Chrysomelidae
- Genus: Sonyadora
- Species: S. quadripustulata

Binomial name
- Sonyadora quadripustulata Bowditch, 1925

= Sonyadora quadripustulata =

Species of beetle

Sonyadora quadripustulata is a species of beetle of the family Chrysomelidae. It is found in Brazil.
