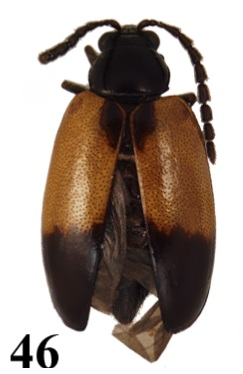

Scientific classification
- Kingdom: Animalia
- Phylum: Arthropoda
- Clade: Pancrustacea
- Class: Insecta
- Order: Coleoptera
- Suborder: Polyphaga
- Infraorder: Cucujiformia
- Family: Chrysomelidae
- Genus: Hecataeus
- Species: H. nigricollis

Binomial name
- Hecataeus nigricollis Jacoby, 1888

= Hecataeus nigricollis =

Species of beetle

Hecataeus nigricollis is a species of beetle of the family Chrysomelidae. It is found in Panama.
