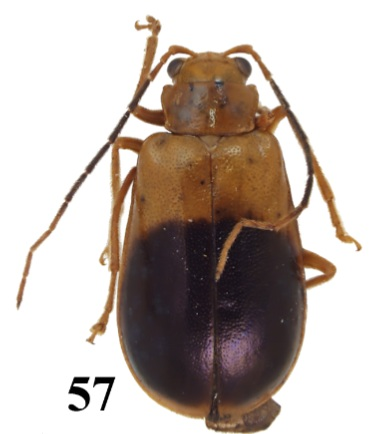

Scientific classification
- Kingdom: Animalia
- Phylum: Arthropoda
- Clade: Pancrustacea
- Class: Insecta
- Order: Coleoptera
- Suborder: Polyphaga
- Infraorder: Cucujiformia
- Family: Chrysomelidae
- Subfamily: Galerucinae
- Tribe: Metacyclini
- Genus: Masurius; Jacoby, 1888

= Masurius =

Genus of leaf beetles

Masurius is a genus of beetles belonging to the family Chrysomelidae. It currently contains one species from Panama. However, specimens possessing the characters Masurius, but differing in colour from the type species have been found, suggesting there are undescribed species for this genus.

== Species ==
- Masurius bifasciatus Jacoby, 1888
