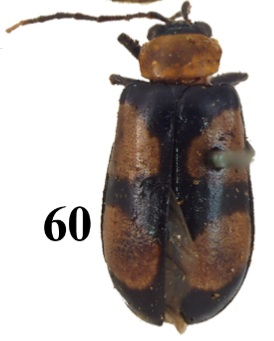
- Sonyadora

Scientific classification
- Kingdom: Animalia
- Phylum: Arthropoda
- Clade: Pancrustacea
- Class: Insecta
- Order: Coleoptera
- Suborder: Polyphaga
- Infraorder: Cucujiformia
- Family: Chrysomelidae
- Subfamily: Galerucinae
- Tribe: Metacyclini
- Genus: Sonyadora; Bechyné, 1958

= Sonyadora =

Genus of leaf beetles

Sonyadora is a genus of beetles belonging to the family Chrysomelidae.

== Species ==
- Sonyadora amazonus (Weise, 1921)
- Sonyadora bivittata (Baly, 1878)
- Sonyadora flavicollis (Jacoby, 1888)
- Sonyadora longicornis (Weise, 1921)
- Sonyadora lucasia (Bechyne, 1956)
- Sonyadora octuguttata (Bowditch, 1925)
- Sonyadora ocularia (Bechyne, 1958)
- Sonyadora parilis (Weise, 1921)
- Sonyadora quadripustulata (Bowditch, 1925)
- Sonyadora rufula (Bowditch, 1925)
- Sonyadora seabrai (Bechyne & Bechyne, 1969)
