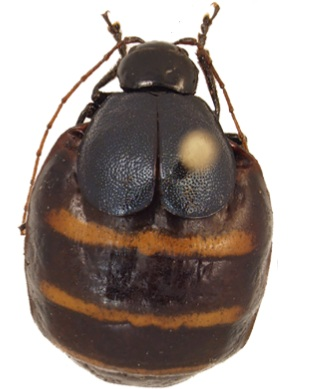

Scientific classification
- Kingdom: Animalia
- Phylum: Arthropoda
- Clade: Pancrustacea
- Class: Insecta
- Order: Coleoptera
- Suborder: Polyphaga
- Infraorder: Cucujiformia
- Family: Chrysomelidae
- Genus: Metacycla
- Species: M. sallei

Binomial name
- Metacycla sallei Baly, 1861

= Metacycla sallei =

Species of beetle

Metacycla sallei is a species of beetle of the family Chrysomelidae. It is found in Mexico.
