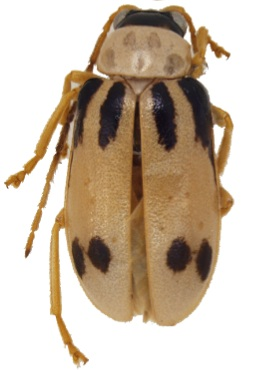

Scientific classification
- Kingdom: Animalia
- Phylum: Arthropoda
- Class: Insecta
- Order: Coleoptera
- Suborder: Polyphaga
- Infraorder: Cucujiformia
- Family: Chrysomelidae
- Genus: Zepherina
- Species: Z. defensa

Binomial name
- Zepherina defensa (Bechyně, 1956)

= Zepherina defensa =

Species of beetle

Zepherina defensa is a species of beetle of the family Chrysomelidae. It is found in Brazil and Peru.
