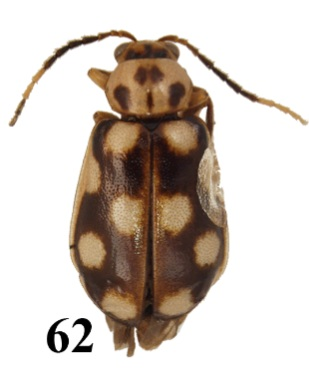

Scientific classification
- Kingdom: Animalia
- Phylum: Arthropoda
- Clade: Pancrustacea
- Class: Insecta
- Order: Coleoptera
- Suborder: Polyphaga
- Infraorder: Cucujiformia
- Family: Chrysomelidae
- Genus: Trigonexora
- Species: T. diversemaculata

Binomial name
- Trigonexora diversemaculata (Bechyné, 1956)

Synonyms
- Exora diversemaculata Bechyné, 1956

= Trigonexora diversemaculata =

Species of beetle

Trigonexora diversemaculata is a species of beetle of the family Chrysomelidae. It is found in Peru.
