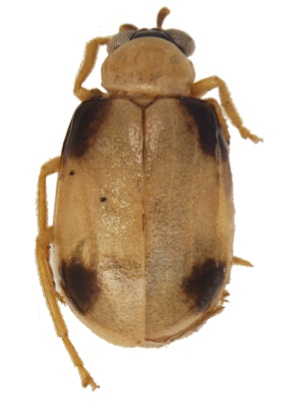

Scientific classification
- Kingdom: Animalia
- Phylum: Arthropoda
- Class: Insecta
- Order: Coleoptera
- Suborder: Polyphaga
- Infraorder: Cucujiformia
- Family: Chrysomelidae
- Genus: Zepherina
- Species: Z. parvicollis

Binomial name
- Zepherina parvicollis Bechyné & Bechyné, 1976

= Zepherina parvicollis =

Species of beetle

Zepherina parvicollis is a species of beetle of the family Chrysomelidae. It is found in Guyana.
