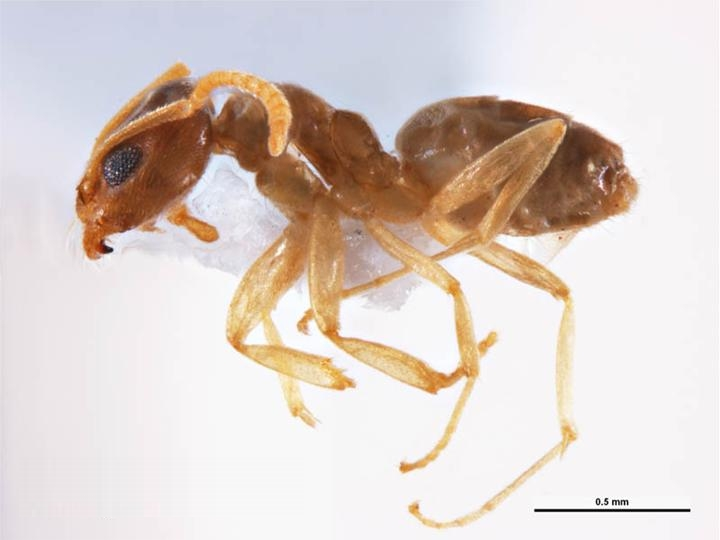

Scientific classification
- Kingdom: Animalia
- Phylum: Arthropoda
- Class: Insecta
- Order: Hymenoptera
- Family: Formicidae
- Subfamily: Dolichoderinae
- Genus: Doleromyrma
- Species: D. rottnestensis

Binomial name
- Doleromyrma rottnestensis (Wheeler, W.M., 1934)

= Doleromyrma rottnestensis =

Species of ant

Doleromyrma rottnestensis is a species of ant in the genus Doleromyrma. Described by William Morton Wheeler in 1934, the species is endemic to Australia.
