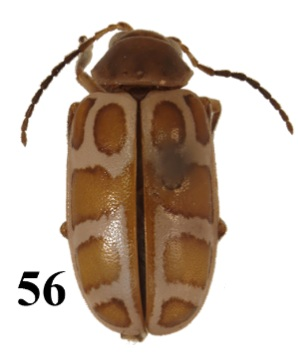

Scientific classification
- Kingdom: Animalia
- Phylum: Arthropoda
- Clade: Pancrustacea
- Class: Insecta
- Order: Coleoptera
- Suborder: Polyphaga
- Infraorder: Cucujiformia
- Family: Chrysomelidae
- Genus: Exora
- Species: E. olivacea

Binomial name
- Exora olivacea (Fabricius, 1801)

Synonyms
- Crioceris olivacea Fabricius, 1801; Galeruca olivacea; Malacosoma olivacea

= Exora olivacea =

Species of beetle

Exora olivacea is a species of beetle of the family Chrysomelidae. It is found in Mexico, Nicaragua, Peru and Ecuador.
