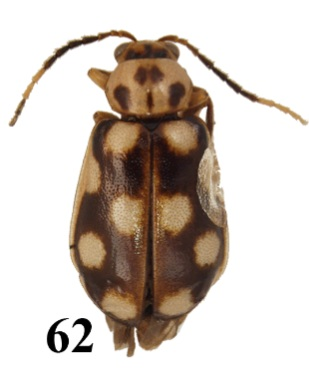
- Trigonexora

Scientific classification
- Kingdom: Animalia
- Phylum: Arthropoda
- Clade: Pancrustacea
- Class: Insecta
- Order: Coleoptera
- Suborder: Polyphaga
- Infraorder: Cucujiformia
- Family: Chrysomelidae
- Subfamily: Galerucinae
- Tribe: Metacyclini
- Genus: Trigonexora; Bechyné & Springlová de Bechyné, 1969

= Trigonexora =

Genus of leaf beetles

Trigonexora is a genus of beetles belonging to the family Chrysomelidae.

== Species ==
- Trigonexora decemstillata (Bechyne, 1958)
- Trigonexora diversemaculata (Bechyné, 1956)
- Trigonexora gerentia (Bechyne & Bechyne, 1964)
- Trigonexora spissa (Bechyne, 1956)
- Trigonexora stilodina (Bechyne & Bechyne, 1962)
