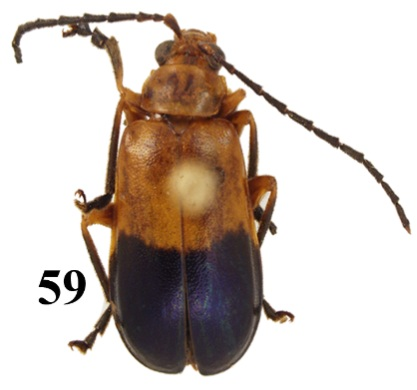

Scientific classification
- Kingdom: Animalia
- Phylum: Arthropoda
- Clade: Pancrustacea
- Class: Insecta
- Order: Coleoptera
- Suborder: Polyphaga
- Infraorder: Cucujiformia
- Family: Chrysomelidae
- Genus: Byblitea
- Species: B. jansoni

Binomial name
- Byblitea jansoni (Jacoby, 1878)

Synonyms
- Diabrotica jansoni Jacoby, 1878; Pyesia jansoni

= Byblitea jansoni =

Species of beetle

Byblitea jansoni is a species of beetle of the family Chrysomelidae. It is found in Nicaragua.
