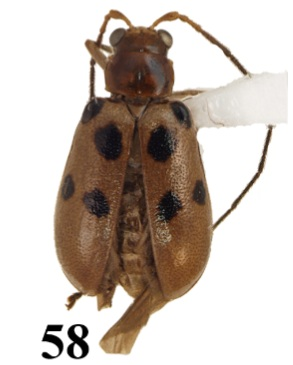
- Elyces

Scientific classification
- Kingdom: Animalia
- Phylum: Arthropoda
- Clade: Pancrustacea
- Class: Insecta
- Order: Coleoptera
- Suborder: Polyphaga
- Infraorder: Cucujiformia
- Family: Chrysomelidae
- Subfamily: Galerucinae
- Tribe: Metacyclini
- Genus: Elyces; Jacoby, 1888

= Elyces =

Genus of leaf beetles

Elyces is a genus of beetles belonging to the family Chrysomelidae.

== Species ==
- Elyces georgia (Bechyne, 1956)
- Elyces nigripennis Jacoby, 1888
- Elyces nigromaculatus Jacoby, 1888
- Elyces obscurovittatus Jacoby, 1888
- Elyces quadrimaculatus Jacoby, 1888
- Elyces rosenbergi Bowditch, 1923
- Elyces subglabrata (Jacoby, 1887)
