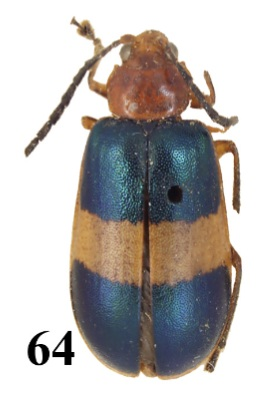
- Pyesia

Scientific classification
- Kingdom: Animalia
- Phylum: Arthropoda
- Clade: Pancrustacea
- Class: Insecta
- Order: Coleoptera
- Suborder: Polyphaga
- Infraorder: Cucujiformia
- Family: Chrysomelidae
- Subfamily: Galerucinae
- Tribe: Metacyclini
- Genus: Pyesia; Clark, 1865

= Pyesia =

Genus of leaf beetles

Pyesia is a genus of beetles belonging to the family Chrysomelidae.

== Species ==
- Pyesia apicalis (Jacoby, 1880)
- Pyesia basalis (Bowditch, 1925)
- Pyesia belarmina Bechyne, 1958
- Pyesia cincta Allard, 1889
- Pyesia erythrura (Bechyne, 1956)
- Pyesia grossa (Bowditch, 1925)
- Pyesia laticornis (Germar, 1823)
- Pyesia mexicana Jacoby, 1887
- Pyesia picta Allard, 1889
- Pyesia rugulipennis (Baly, 1890)
