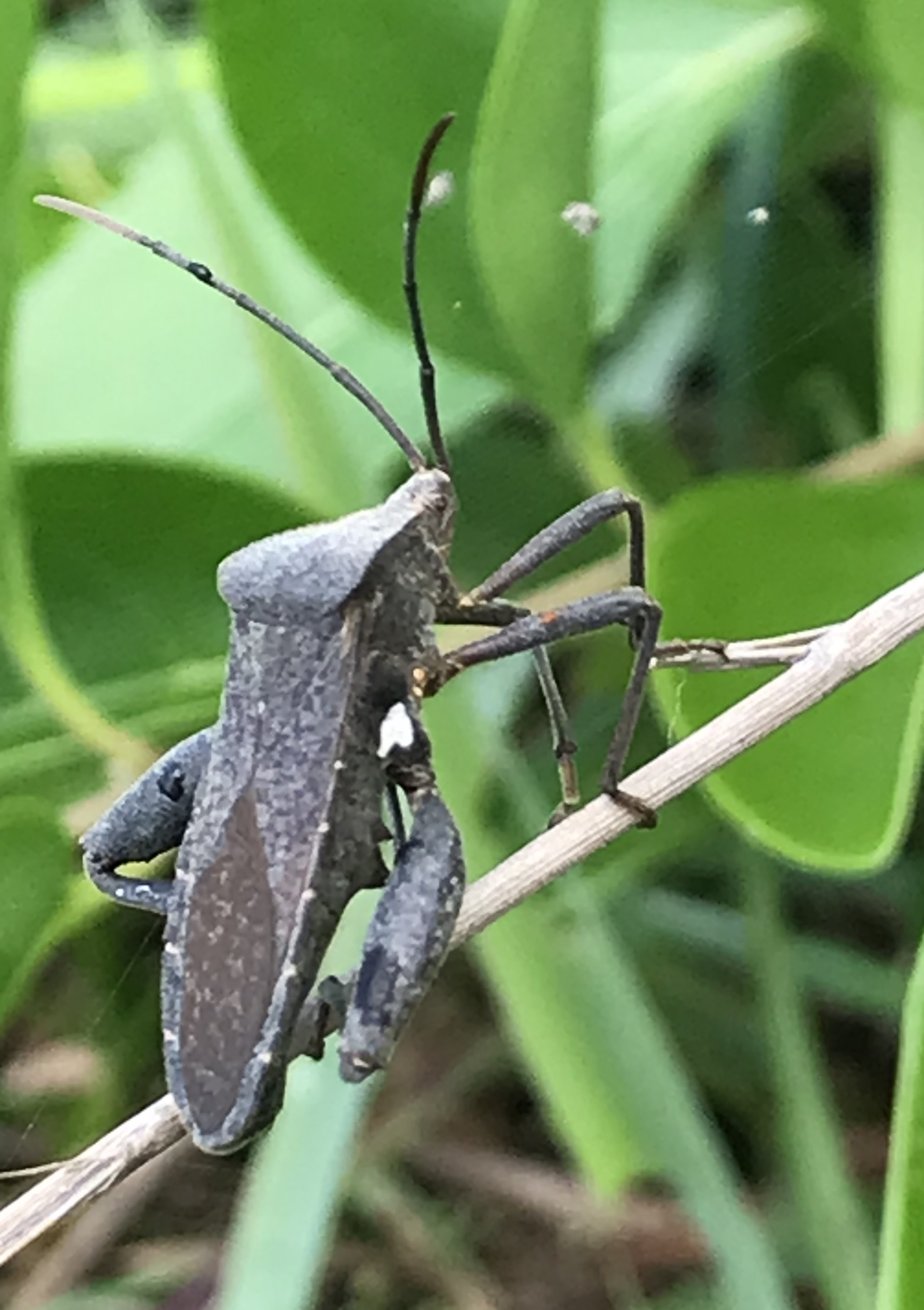
- Mictis tenebrosa from Hong Kong

Scientific classification
- Domain: Eukaryota
- Kingdom: Animalia
- Phylum: Arthropoda
- Class: Insecta
- Order: Hemiptera
- Suborder: Heteroptera
- Family: Coreidae
- Tribe: Mictini
- Genus: Mictis; Leach, 1814

= Mictis =

Genus of insects in the family Coreidae

Mictis is a genus of sap-sucking insects in the family Coreidae, with species recorded from India, China, Vietnam and Malesia through to Australia. It was described by William Elford Leach in 1814.

== Description ==
From the original description:

Head immersed even to the eyes within the thorax; vertex with two ocelli placed transversely; antennae filiform, four-jointed, joints cylindric, equal, or with the first joint rather longer.

Anterior four feet alike in size and form; hinder ones with thick thighs and with the internal side of the tibiae dilated; tarsi all three-joined, the first longor than the other two conjoined.

Body elongate, flat above; thorax triangular, very narrow in front; abdomen with dilated sides.

== Etymology ==
The original description gives no explanation of its etymology.

== Species ==
The Coreoidea species file lists (as of 2022):

1. Mictis abstrusa Linnavuori, 1978
2. Mictis amboinensis Walker, 1871
3. Mictis angusta Hsiao, 1965
4. Mictis caja Stål, 1865
5. Mictis difficilis Brailovsky & Barrera, 2006
6. Mictis dilatipes (Blöte, 1938)
7. Mictis discolor Dallas, 1852
8. Mictis falloui Reuter, 1888
9. Mictis farinulenta Breddin, 1899
10. Mictis formidabilis Distant, 1918
11. Mictis fuscipes Hsiao, 1963
12. Mictis gallina Dallas, 1852
13. Mictis javana Walker, 1871
14. Mictis longicornis Westwood, 1842
15. Mictis macra Stål, 1865
16. Mictis oceanensis Distant, 1900
17. Mictis profana (Fabricius, 1803) - type species (as Mictis crucifera Leach)
18. Mictis pungens Stål, 1871
19. Mictis riedeli Brailovsky, 2002
20. Mictis rufovittata Walker, 1871
21. Mictis serina Dallas, 1852
22. Mictis sulawesiana Brailovsky, 2002
23. Mictis tenebrosa (Fabricius, 1787)
24. Mictis tridentifer Blöte, 1938
25. Mictis tuberosa Hsiao, 1965
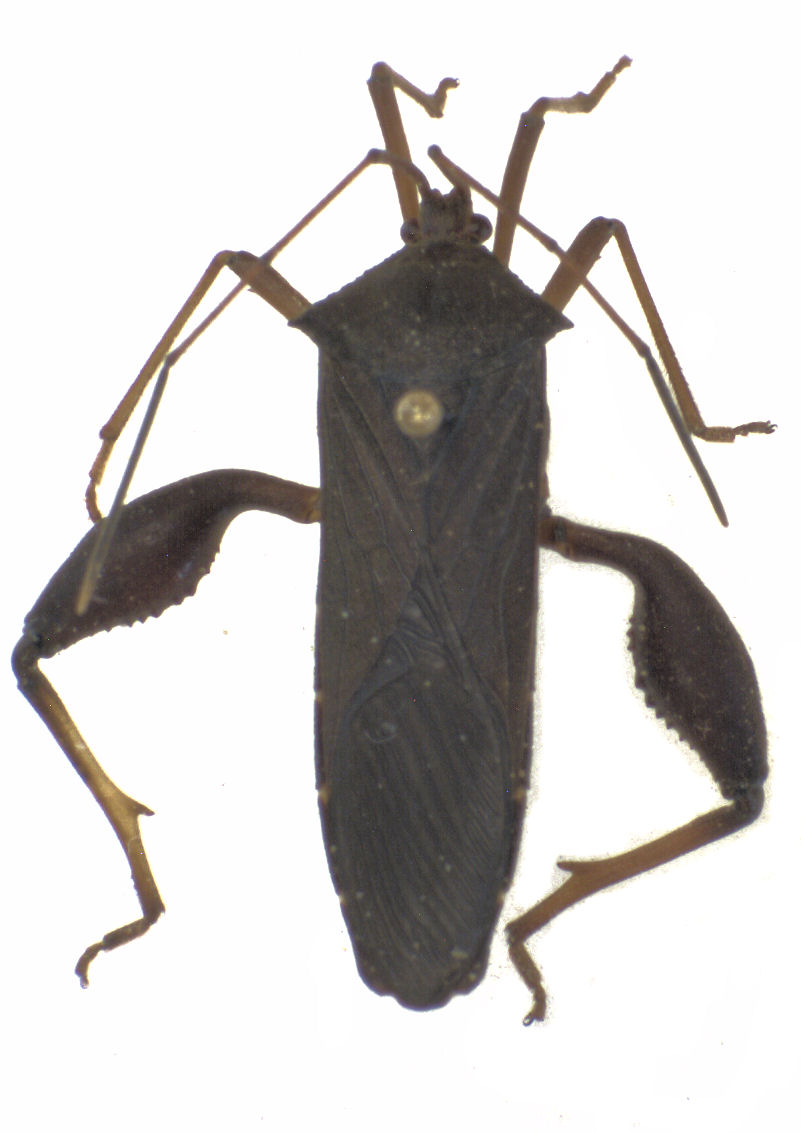
M. longicornis

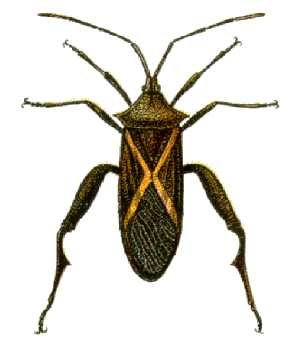
M. profana

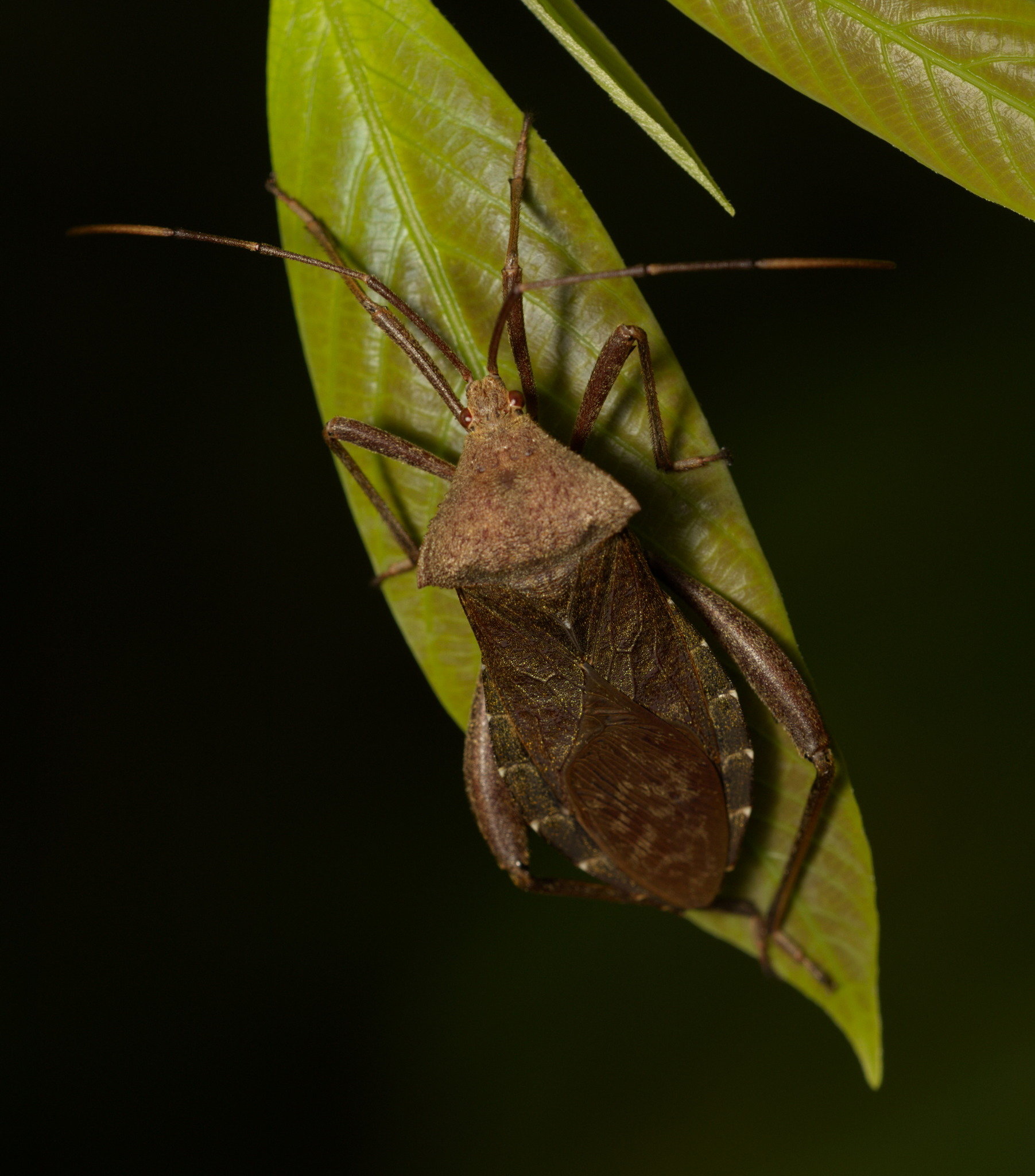
M. gallina

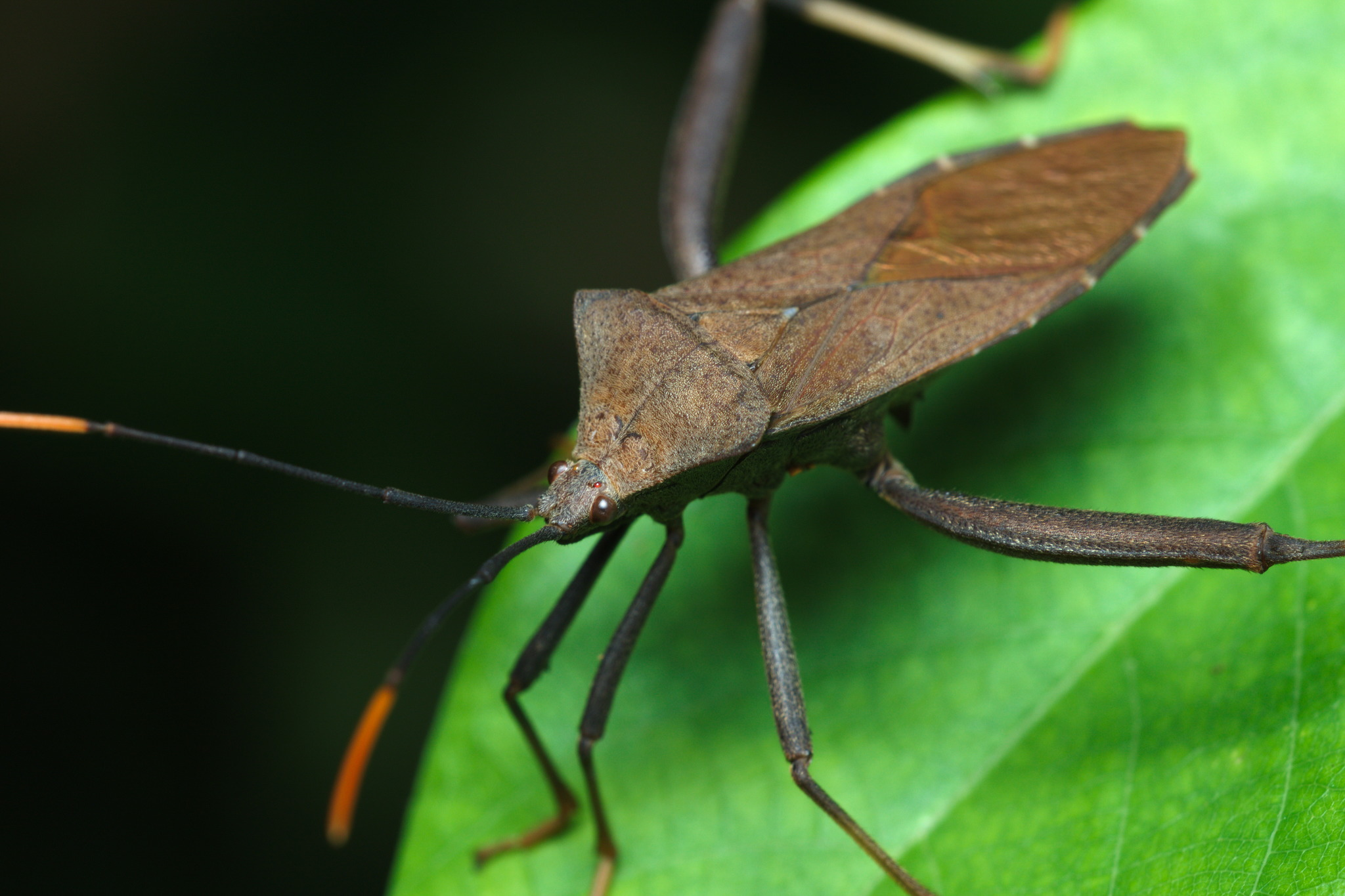
M. serina
