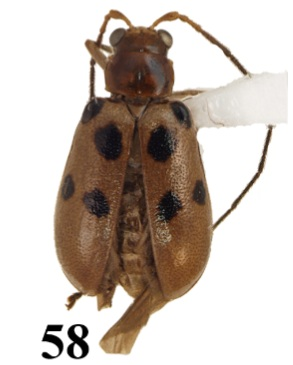

Scientific classification
- Kingdom: Animalia
- Phylum: Arthropoda
- Clade: Pancrustacea
- Class: Insecta
- Order: Coleoptera
- Suborder: Polyphaga
- Infraorder: Cucujiformia
- Family: Chrysomelidae
- Genus: Elyces
- Species: E. quadrimaculatus

Binomial name
- Elyces quadrimaculatus Jacoby, 1888

= Elyces quadrimaculatus =

Species of beetle

Elyces quadrimaculatus is a species of beetle of the family Chrysomelidae. It is found in Nicaragua.
