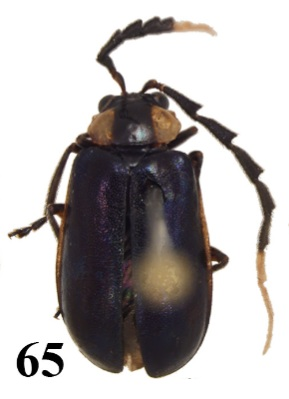
- Chthoneis

Scientific classification
- Kingdom: Animalia
- Phylum: Arthropoda
- Clade: Pancrustacea
- Class: Insecta
- Order: Coleoptera
- Suborder: Polyphaga
- Infraorder: Cucujiformia
- Family: Chrysomelidae
- Subfamily: Galerucinae
- Tribe: Metacyclini
- Genus: Chthoneis; Baly, 1864

= Chthoneis =

Genus of leaf beetles

Chthoneis is a genus of beetles belonging to the family Chrysomelidae.

== Species ==
- Chthoneis albicollis Baly, 1878
- Chthoneis altimontana Bechyne, 1956
- Chthoneis apicicornis Baly, 1864
- Chthoneis boliviensis Bowditch, 1925
- Chthoneis bowditchi Wlicox, 1965
- Chthoneis brasiliensis (Jacoby, 1894)
- Chthoneis clypeata Bechyne& Bechyne, 1965
- Chthoneis dilaticornis Jacoby, 1888
- Chthoneis flava (Allard, 1889)
- Chthoneis forticornis (Erichson, 1847)
- Chthoneis fucatus (Erichson, 1847)
- Chthoneis grayi Baly, 1878
- Chthoneis iquitoensis Bechyne, 1956
- Chthoneis jansoni Jacoby, 1879
- Chthoneis marginicollis Jacoby, 1881
- Chthoneis pebasa Bechyne, 1956
- Chthoneis rex Bechyne, 1956
- Chthoneis rosenbergi Bowditch, 1925
- Chthoneis selecta Bechyne, 1956
- Chthoneis stuarti Bowditch, 1925
- Chthoneis suturalis (Duvivier, 1885)
- Chthoneis transversicollis Bechyne & Bechyne, 1965
- Chthoneis trapezicollis (Bechyne, 1958)
