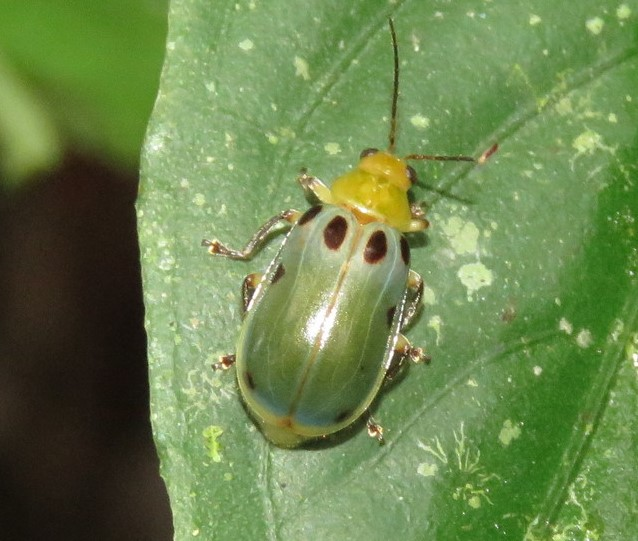
- Exora obsoleta

Scientific classification
- Kingdom: Animalia
- Phylum: Arthropoda
- Clade: Pancrustacea
- Class: Insecta
- Order: Coleoptera
- Suborder: Polyphaga
- Infraorder: Cucujiformia
- Family: Chrysomelidae
- Tribe: Metacyclini
- Genus: Exora; Chevrolat, 1836

= Exora =

Genus of beetles

Exora is a genus of leaf beetles in the family Chrysomelidae.

== Species ==
- Exora callanga Bechyné, 1956
- Exora cingulata Bechyné, 1956
- Exora costaricensis Bechyné, 1958
- Exora encaustica (Germar, 1823)
- Exora obsoleta (Fabricius, 1801)
- Exora olivacea (Fabricius, 1801)
- Exora paraensis Bechyné, 1958
- Exora rosenbergi (Bowditch, 1925)
- Exora rufa (Weise, 1921)
- Exora signifera (Bechyné, 1956)
- Exora tippmanni (Bechyné, 1956)
- Exora wittmeri (Bechyné, 1956)
