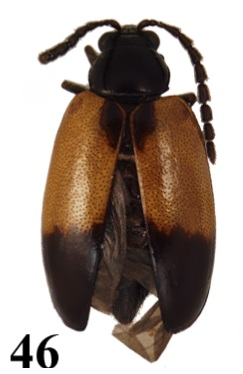
- Hecataeus

Scientific classification
- Kingdom: Animalia
- Phylum: Arthropoda
- Clade: Pancrustacea
- Class: Insecta
- Order: Coleoptera
- Suborder: Polyphaga
- Infraorder: Cucujiformia
- Family: Chrysomelidae
- Subfamily: Galerucinae
- Tribe: Metacyclini
- Genus: Hecataeus; Jacoby, 1888

= Hecataeus (beetle) =

Genus of leaf beetles

Hecataeus is a genus of beetles belonging to the family Chrysomelidae.

== Species ==
- Hecataeus hospes (Weise, 1921)
- Hecataeus nigricollis Jacoby, 1888
- Hecataeus nirguus Bechyne, 1997
