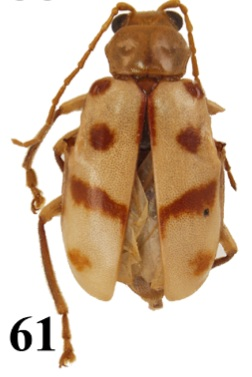

Scientific classification
- Kingdom: Animalia
- Phylum: Arthropoda
- Clade: Pancrustacea
- Class: Insecta
- Order: Coleoptera
- Suborder: Polyphaga
- Infraorder: Cucujiformia
- Family: Chrysomelidae
- Genus: Malacorhinus
- Species: M. foveipennis

Binomial name
- Malacorhinus foveipennis (Jacoby, 1879)

Synonyms
- Diabrotica foveipennis Jacoby, 1879

= Malacorhinus foveipennis =

Species of beetle

Malacorhinus foveipennis is a species of beetle of the family Chrysomelidae. It is found in Mexico, Guatemala and Nicaragua.
