= Red imported fire ants in the United States =

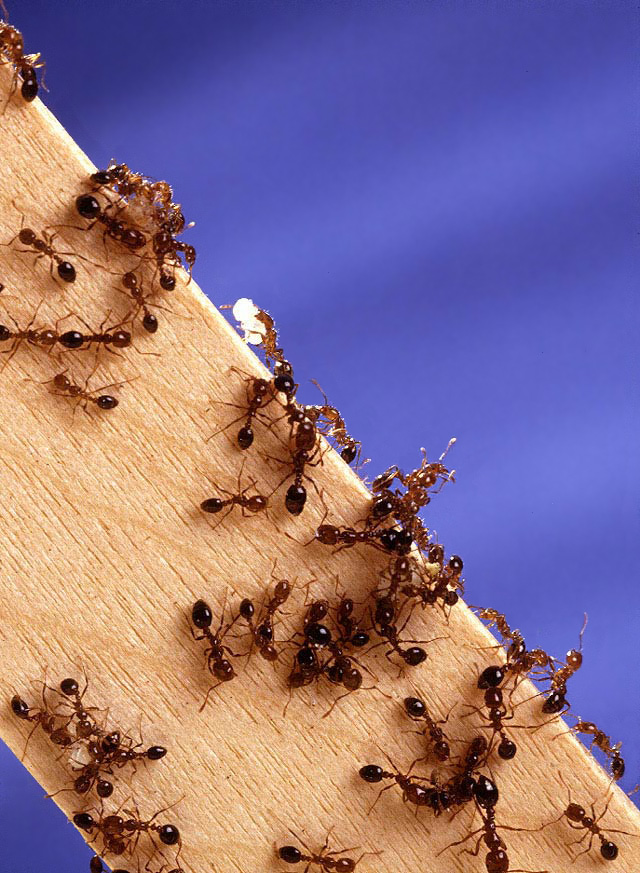

The red imported fire ant (Solenopsis invicta), or simply RIFA, is one of over 280 species in the widespread genus Solenopsis. It is native to South America but it has become both a pest and a health hazard in the southern United States as well as a number of other countries.

== Introduction ==
In the 1930s, colonies were accidentally introduced into the United States through the seaport of Mobile, Alabama. Despite earlier views that cargo ships from Brazil docking at Mobile unloaded goods infested with the ants, recent DNA research confirmed that the likely source population for all invasive S. invicta in the United States occurred at or near Formosa, Argentina, and virtually every analysis ruled out all sampled Brazilian populations as a potential source. Biologist E.O. Wilson says that he reported the first colony, in the Mobile area, when he was 13. The ants then spread from Alabama to almost every state of the American South, from Texas to Maryland and a few other Mid-Atlantic states. Since the 1990s infestations have been reported in New Mexico and parts of Arizona in the Southwest. They have also been reported in California in the West, but probably arrived via ship or truck rather than by spreading. In a similar way, the ants were accidentally introduced into Australia in 2001.

== Spread ==
In the United States, RIFAs have gradually spread north and west despite intense efforts to stop or eliminate them. As of 2011 in the United States they were found in most of the southern states: Alabama, Arkansas, Arizona, California, Delaware, Florida, Georgia, Kentucky, Louisiana, Mississippi, North Carolina, New Mexico, Oklahoma, South Carolina, Tennessee, Texas, and Virginia. Likely due to absence of South American competitors - and lower numbers of native competitors - S. invicta dominates more extrafloral nectaries and hemipteran honeydew sources in the southern U.S. than in its home range, probably contributing to its higher population densities in its invasive range. The U.S. Department of Agriculture also lists the entire island of Puerto Rico as infested.

RIFAs were still on the move in the U.S. in the early 21st century, often traveling from one area to another in turf, root balls of nursery plants, and other agricultural products. They could be controlled, but not eradicated. A number of products are available, which can be used on a mound-by-mound basis to destroy ant colonies when they appear. With all such efforts, it is important to reach and kill the queens, which may be as far as six feet (2 m) underground; otherwise, some queens may simply move a short distance away and quickly re-establish the colony. However, during the past few years, even this technique resulted in failure to control colony growth. Scientists then discovered that an adaptation in RIFAs had resulted in many populations having multiple queens in mounds over a large area.

In areas where Solenopsis invicta (red imported fire ants) founded colonies, larger colonies of Tetramorium caespitum (pavement ants) have destroyed them, leading entomologists to conclude that this conflict between the two species would decelerate the northward spread of Solenopsis invicta.

== Economic impact ==
The RIFA's introduction to the United States was in the late 1930s. Traveling in soil used as ballast on cargo ships, they came in through the seaport of Mobile, Alabama. They build mounds, usually no larger than 46 cm (18 in) in diameter and 46 cm (18 in) in height, although in Alabama some mounds have been reported to be over 60 cm (24 in) high and larger, especially in fields where cattle graze. They build on soil close to homes and other buildings, and sometimes forage indoors for food and moisture. They are a nuisance, and can threaten sleeping or bedridden individuals and pets. Occasionally, they feed on vegetable plants in home gardens. The worst damage usually occurs during hot, dry weather, when they invade flower beds while seeking warmth and moisture. If disturbed, fire ants bite and sting the intruder.

They are apparently attracted to electrical equipment, and crawl into air conditioning units and the electrical wiring of stop lights, shorting them out. This is the leading cause of traffic light shorts in Texas, where the ants cause more than US$140 million in damage each year. Several ant species, including fire ants, have been shown to contain ferromagnetic nanoparticles that may contribute information about the geomagnetic field for orientation during foraging or migration. However, it has not been found that electric or magnetic fields attract the ants. Rather, when wandering ants cause electrical shorts, they attempt to sting the wire and produce powerful semiochemicals, including defensive and recruitment pheromones. The chemical signals draw additional ants to the short. The only effective protection is to bar ants from the equipment physically or with insecticides.

The FDA estimates more than US$5 billion is spent annually on medical treatment, damage, and control in RIFA-infested areas. Further, the ants cause approximately US$750 million in damage to agricultural assets, including veterinary bills and livestock loss, as well as crop loss. It has been proposed that modern insecticides are not effective in large-scale control of fire ants; therefore, a number of new strategies are proposed. These include the use of entomopathogenic fungi and even specific viruses.

== See also ==
- Invasive species in the United States
