= Global Invasive Species Database =

Database of invasive species

The Global Invasive Species Database is a database of invasive species around the world run by the Invasive Species Specialist Group (ISSG) of the International Union for Conservation of Nature. It publishes the list 100 of the World's Worst Invasive Alien Species.
