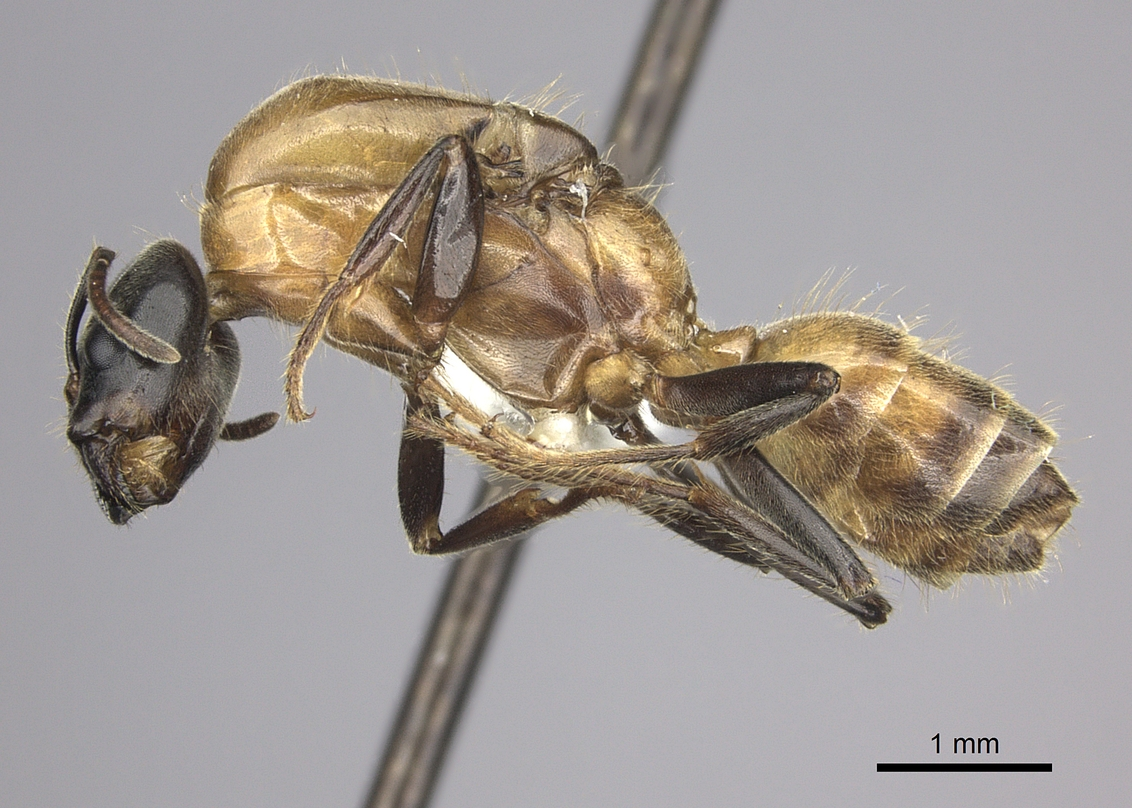

Scientific classification
- Kingdom: Animalia
- Phylum: Arthropoda
- Clade: Pancrustacea
- Class: Insecta
- Order: Hymenoptera
- Family: Formicidae
- Subfamily: Dolichoderinae
- Genus: Azteca
- Species: A. muelleri

Binomial name
- Azteca muelleri Emery, 1893

Synonyms
- Azteca brunni; Azteca gibbifera; Azteca janeirensis; Azteca nigella; Azteca nigridens; Azteca wacketi

= Azteca muelleri =

Species of ant

Azteca muelleri is a species of ant in the genus Azteca. Described by the Italian entomologist Carlo Emery in 1893, the species is native to Central and South America. It lives in colonies in the hollow trunk and branches of Cecropia trees. The specific name muelleri was given in honour of a German biologist Fritz Müller, who discovered that the small bodies at the petiole-bases of Cecropia are food bodies.

== Distribution and habitat ==
This ant is found in Central America and as far south as southern Brazil and eastern Peru, at altitudes of up to 1,800 m (6,000 ft). It occurs in rainforest and semi-deciduous forests where it is an obligate symbiont of Cecropia trees, often Cecropia glaziovii, Cecropia angustifolia, or Cecropia pachystachya.

== Ecology ==
Azteca muelleri forms a spongy nest in cavities inside the trunk and branches of a Cecropia tree. This is a mutualistic arrangement as the ants defend the tree against herbivorous animals while the ants benefit from food bodies provided by the tree.

A. muelleri is very aggressive. Another insect that also lives in the hollow twigs and branches of C. pachystachya is the beetle Coelomera ruficornis. This beetle can co-exist on a single host tree with the ant Azteca alfari, but A. muelleri removes or drives away the beetles on its host tree, with larger colonies of A muelleri able to locate and expel the beetles faster than small colonies can.

There is competition for resources between A. alfari and A. muelleri. Typically, A. alfari is the first to colonise a young Cecropia sapling, perhaps by the roadside or in a clearing, as these trees are pioneering species. As the young tree grows, A. alfari tends to occupy the tips of the branches and abandons the cavities in the larger branches; the colonies have multiple queens and a number of separate colonies come to occupy the same tree. In contrast, A. muelleri may colonise the tree at a later stage in its growth; it has a central nest in the trunk of the tree, where the brood is reared, but maintains passageways to the branch tips. The tree provides Müllerian bodies on the leaf stalks, which provide food for the ants.
