= Coelomera ruficornis =

Scientific classification
- Kingdom: Animalia
- Phylum: Arthropoda
- Clade: Pancrustacea
- Class: Insecta
- Order: Coleoptera
- Suborder: Polyphaga
- Infraorder: Cucujiformia
- Family: Chrysomelidae
- Genus: Coelomera
- Species: C. ruficornis

Binomial name
- Coelomera ruficornis Baly, 1865

Species of insect (beetle)

Coelomera ruficornis is a species of beetle in the family Chrysomelidae. It is found in tropical South America where it feeds on Cecropia pachystachya trees.

== Ecology ==
Coelomera ruficornis lives on Cecropia pachystachya, a tree with a mutualistic association with the ant Azteca alfari. The ants live in the hollow branches and shoots, a newly mated queen having entered through the prostoma, an indented groove at a node in the stem. The ants then protect the tree against leaf-cutting ants and other herbivorous insects. The adult female beetle also chews a hole in the prosoma, a task which may take as long as 24 hours, inserts the tip of her abdomen into the hole and lays a batch of about 65 eggs inside the hollow stem. She then covers these with a glutinous secretion and seals the hole.

The eggs hatch after 20 days in June and after 12 days in March. The larvae are gregarious, and have three instar stages. They form chains as they move, and make their way to the underside of leaves to feed; at night they form themselves into circles with their heads in the centre, protected on the outside by their supra-anal shields. When fully developed, they descend to the base of the tree, and pupate in earthen chambers. The adult beetles are toxic, and the ants tolerate their presence on the tree.

Another species of ant, Azteca muelleri, also lives on C. pachystachya, and is not so tolerant of the presence of the beetle. It removes C. ruficornis from trees it has colonised, and the larger the ant colony, the more quickly the beetles are located and expelled.
