= Correbidia terminalis =

Scientific classification
- Kingdom: Animalia
- Phylum: Arthropoda
- Class: Insecta
- Order: Lepidoptera
- Superfamily: Noctuoidea
- Family: Erebidae
- Subfamily: Arctiinae
- Genus: Correbidia
- Species: C. terminalis

Binomial name
- Correbidia terminalis (Walker, 1856)

Synonyms
- Pionia terminalis Walker, 1856; Charidea bicolor Herrich-Schäffer, 1866; Correbidia bicolor; Correbia subochrea Herrich-Schäffer, 1866; Charidea cimicoides Herrich-Schäffer, 1866; Charidea bicolor Herrich-Schäffer, 1866; Correbidia apicalis Schaus, 1904; Lycomorpha fumata Moschler, 1890; Correbia germana Rothschild, 1912; Correbia steinbachi Rothschild, 1912

Species of moth

Correbidia terminalis is a moth in the subfamily Arctiinae. It was described by Francis Walker in 1856. It is found from Mexico through Central America (including Guatemala, Costa Rica, Panama) and Cuba and Puerto Rico to South America (including Venezuela).

The larvae feed on the leaves of Cecropia peltata.
