= C. tubulosa =

C. tubulosa may refer to:

- Cecropia tubulosa, a plant species found in Peru
- Cistanche tubulosa, a parasitic desert plant species
