= Cecropia longipes =

Conservation status
- Least Concern (IUCN 3.1)

Scientific classification
- Kingdom: Plantae
- Clade: Embryophytes
- Clade: Tracheophytes
- Clade: Spermatophytes
- Clade: Angiosperms
- Clade: Eudicots
- Clade: Rosids
- Order: Rosales
- Family: Urticaceae
- Genus: Cecropia
- Species: C. longipes

Binomial name
- Cecropia longipes Pittier

Species of flowering plant

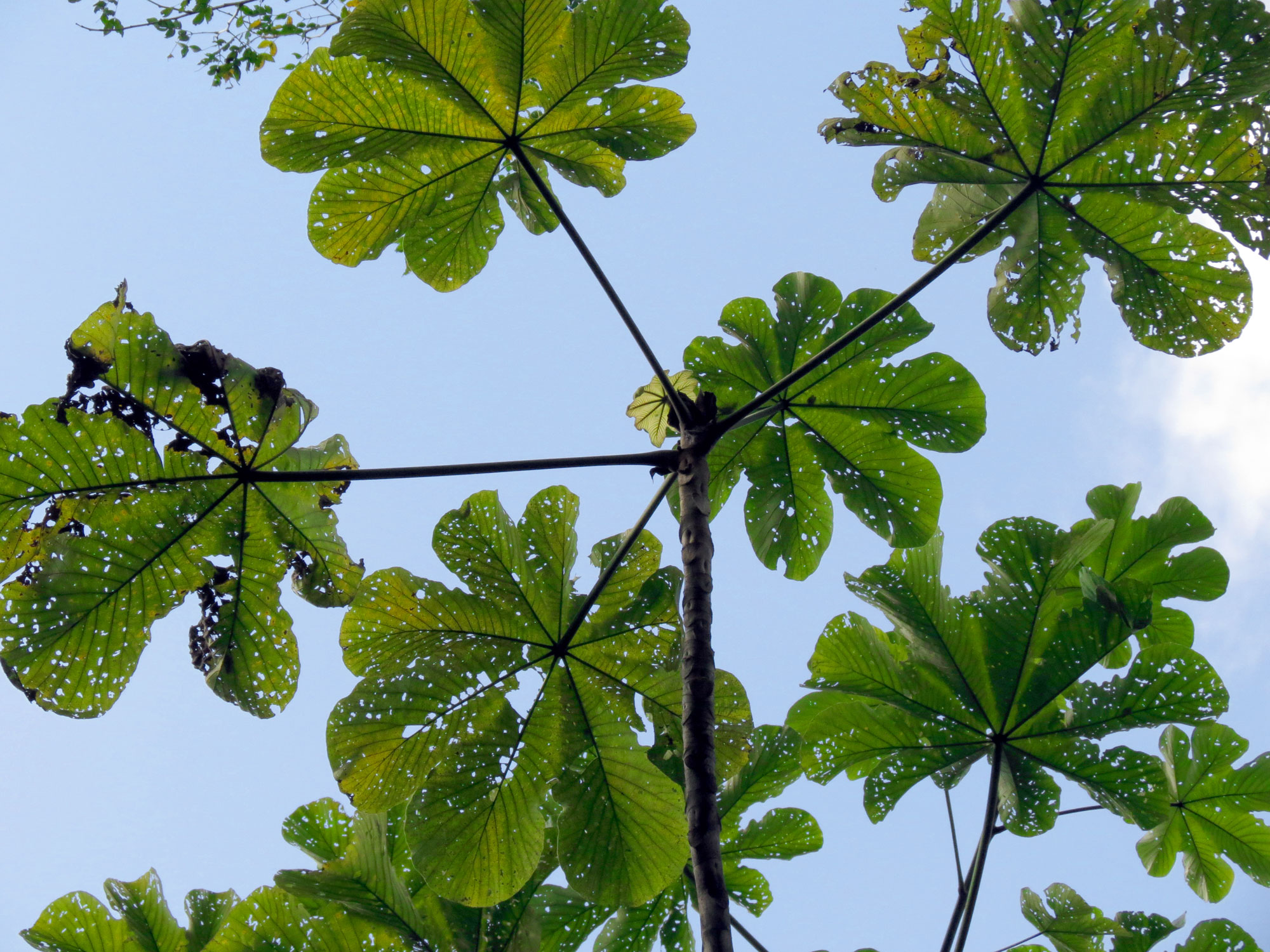

Cecropia longipes is a species of flowering plant in the family Urticaceae. It is a tree native to northwestern Colombia and eastern Panama, where it grows in lowland rain forests. It is threatened by habitat loss.

The tree is mostly wind-pollinated. Inflorescences are breeding sites for some species of flies and small beetles, which may also have a role in pollination. Seeds are dispersed by fruit-eating animals including opossums, toucans, bats, and monkeys. The tree has a symbiotic relationship with the ant species Azteca alfari, which forms colonies in the tree's hollow stems.

The species was first described by Henri François Pittier in 1917.
