= Cecropia utcubambana =

Conservation status
- Vulnerable (IUCN 2.3)

Scientific classification
- Kingdom: Plantae
- Clade: Tracheophytes
- Clade: Angiosperms
- Clade: Eudicots
- Clade: Rosids
- Order: Rosales
- Family: Urticaceae
- Genus: Cecropia
- Species: C. utcubambana

Binomial name
- Cecropia utcubambana Cuatrec.

Species of plant

Cecropia utcubambana is a species of plant in the family Urticaceae. It is endemic to Peru.
