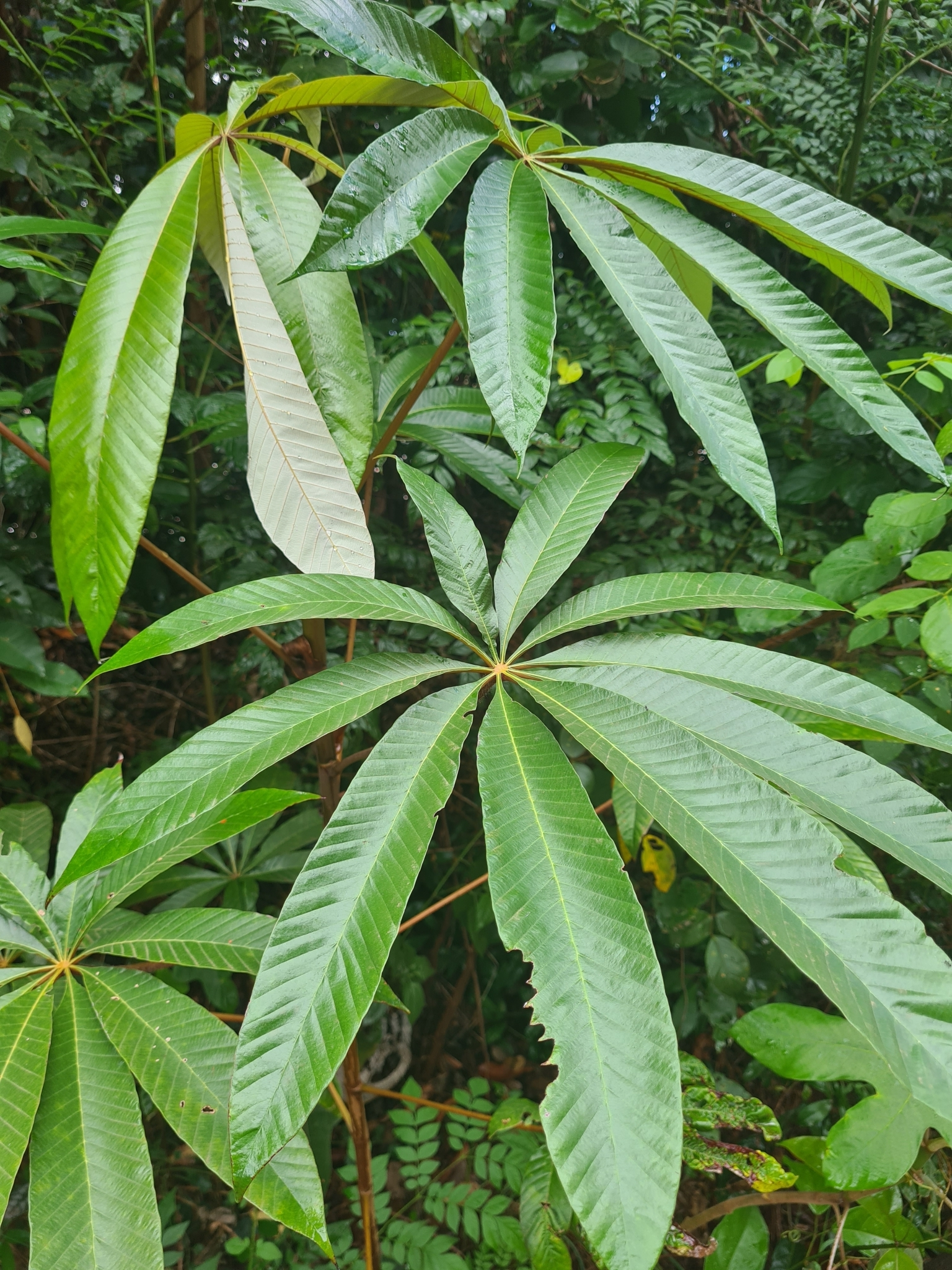

Scientific classification
- Kingdom: Plantae
- Clade: Tracheophytes
- Clade: Angiosperms
- Clade: Eudicots
- Clade: Rosids
- Order: Rosales
- Family: Urticaceae
- Genus: Cecropia
- Species: C. sciadophylla

Binomial name
- Cecropia sciadophylla C.Mart.

= Cecropia sciadophylla =

Plant species

Cecropia sciadophylla is a plant species from the genus Cecropia. The species was originally described by Carl Friedrich Philipp von Martius in 1841.

== Description ==
Cecropia sciadophylla is a pioneer tree in the neotropics. The tree can grow up to 30 meters in height. It grows in well-drained areas and as a pioneer plant emerges in damaged areas.

== Distribution ==
Cecropia sciadophylla can be found from sea-level up to 1300 meters from sea-level ranging from French Guiana to Colombia. This is also confirmed by crowd-sourced observations.
