= Cecropia multiflora =

Conservation status
- Near Threatened (IUCN 2.3)

Scientific classification
- Kingdom: Plantae
- Clade: Tracheophytes
- Clade: Angiosperms
- Clade: Eudicots
- Clade: Rosids
- Order: Rosales
- Family: Urticaceae
- Genus: Cecropia
- Species: C. multiflora

Binomial name
- Cecropia multiflora Snethlage

Species of plant

Cecropia multiflora is a species of plant in the family Urticaceae. It is endemic to Peru.
