= Francisco del Paso y Troncoso =

Francisco de Borja del Paso y Troncoso (October 8, 1842 in Veracruz, Veracruz Mexico – April 30, 1916 in Florence, Italy) was an important Mexican historian, archivist, and scholar of the Nahuatl language. He "was and remains the outstanding major Mexican investigator of his era, a fully accepted figure in the international group of his peers."

== Early life and education ==
Del Paso y Troncoso, often cited in bibliographies as Paso y Troncoso, attended primary school in his hometown of Veracruz, and later moved to Mexico City. In his youth, he dedicated most of his time to commercial activities, but still found time to register in the National Preparatory School, attending as a regular student until he had successfully completed his studies. It is believed that he had among his teachers Don Gabino Barreda, and he had initially decided to pursue a career in medicine. Toward the end of his studies he wanted to prepare his thesis on the botany and ethno-pharmacology of the ancient Mexicans. His initial investigation in this field aroused his interest so much that he devoted himself to the study and research of the archaeological field, particularly to the inquiry of documentary sources from both Indian and Spanish authors of the 16th century. This change in studies was eventually at the cost of his not receiving his medical degree.

== Career ==
He soon came to focus on the Nahuatl language, and his work came to be permanently linked to the National Archaeological Museum. In 1889 Del Paso y Troncoso was appointed director of that institution. During much of 1890 and 1891, he led a significant archaeological exploration of the state of Veracruz.

In 1892, at the commemoration of the 400th Anniversary of European contact with the New World, Del Paso y Troncoso was nominated president of the Mexican Commission on the American Historic Exhibition to be held in Madrid. He kept his title as director of the National Archaeological Museum in Mexico, and traveled to Spain in August 1892. Del Paso y Troncoso was to remain in Europe until his death, working without rest in archives and libraries on the continent.

During the nearly twenty-four years devoted to research and outside of Mexico, Del Paso y Troncoso arranged for publication a wealth of documents and previously unpublished works of the utmost importance for the history of Mexico. His extensive correspondence shows that he was always in contact with cultural institutions and specialists in his country and others from abroad that were also interested in the same field of research. Utilizing materials found in the libraries, archives and collections of Mexico and Europe, Del Paso y Troncoso made significant contributions to the historiography of the Conquest-era and Colonial Mexico periods, identifying, collating and publishing a number of important historical source documents and original manuscripts. Many of these documentary collections were utilized by Charles Gibson, historian in his 1964 publication Aztecs Under Spanish Rule, which established in English-language scholarship the importance of the indigenous in the colonial history of Mexico.

Before 1884, Del Paso y Troncoso was elected Fellow of the Mexican Academy of Language. In 1893 he was appointed a member of the Royal Academy of History and also of the Spanish Association of Writers and Artists. In 1895 he was received as an honorary member of the Pontifical Roman Academy of Archaeology, and as a correspondent of the Paris Societe des Americanist. In 1898 he also obtained a diploma of honorary membership of the Royal Anthropological Institute of Great Britain and Ireland.

== Publications ==
In the Anales del Museo Nacional de Arqueología he published "Ensayos sobre los símbolos cronológicos de los mexicanos", 1892; "Estudio sobre la historia de la medicina en México", 1896; "Lingüística de la República Mexicana", 1886; "Códice indiano del Sr. Sánchez Solís", 1888; "Los trabajos lingüísticos de don Miguel Trinidad Palma", 1897; "Notas arqueológicas y cronológicas al estudio de interpretación del Códice Borgiano hecho por José Lino Fábrega", 1899–1900; "Lista de los pueblos principales que pertenecieron a Texcoco", 1897; " Utilidad de la lengua mexicana en algunos estudios literarios", 1897; "División territorial de la Nueva España en el año de 1636", 1912; "Escritura pictórica, el códice Kingsborough", 1912.

Another, very significant publication that he brought together, utilizing military records and dispatches, and a host of other historic sources, is "Las guerras con las Tribus Yaqui y Mayo del estado de Sonora, Mexico." Mexico, 1905. It is one of two major sources that cover the Yaqui Wars.

A number of editions of major works on the history of Mexico appeared after his death, including the following titles: Historia y conquista espiritual de Yucatán, de fray Bernardo de Lizana, México, 1892; Biblioteca nahua, 6 v., Florencia, 1899-1909; Historia de las cosas de la Nueva España de fray Bernardino de Sahagún (Primeros memoriales, Códice matritense del Real Palacio y Códice de la Real Academia de la Historia, textos de los informantes de Sahagún), 3 v., Madrid, 1906-1907; Papeles de Nueva España, 7 v., Madrid-México, 1905; Códice Mendocino, México, 1925; Crónica de Nueva España, del doctor don Francisco Cervantes de Salazar, 3 v., Madrid-México, 1914-1936; Epistolario de la Nueva España, 16 v., México, 1939-1942.

Some of his other contributions include: Los libros de Anáhuac, México, 1895; Comentario al Códice Borbónico, Florencia, 1905.

== Assessment of his work and career ==
Del Paso y Troncoso is a major figure in Mexican historiography, tirelessly tracking down manuscript materials in archives in Mexico and throughout Europe. He was "certainly the most erudite Mexican specialist of his era, [but] he allowed this deep knowledge to impede rather than advance his own direct contribution. He published just a fraction of what he had collected, since he meticulously edited and annotated the primary texts. A number of his works appeared after his death in "subprofessional dress...in untrustworthy editions" published by others. Some of Del Paso y Troncoso's work was widely considered to have published under another's name. By contrast, Mexican historian Silvio Zavala capably edited and published 16 volumes of Del Paso y Troncoso's Epistolario de Nueva España (1939–42).
