= Correbidia notata =

Scientific classification
- Domain: Eukaryota
- Kingdom: Animalia
- Phylum: Arthropoda
- Class: Insecta
- Order: Lepidoptera
- Superfamily: Noctuoidea
- Family: Erebidae
- Subfamily: Arctiinae
- Genus: Correbidia
- Species: C. notata

Binomial name
- Correbidia notata (Butler, 1878)

Synonyms
- Pionia notata Butler, 1878

Species of moth

Correbidia notata is a moth of the subfamily Arctiinae. It was described by Arthur Gardiner Butler in 1878. It is found in the Amazon region.
