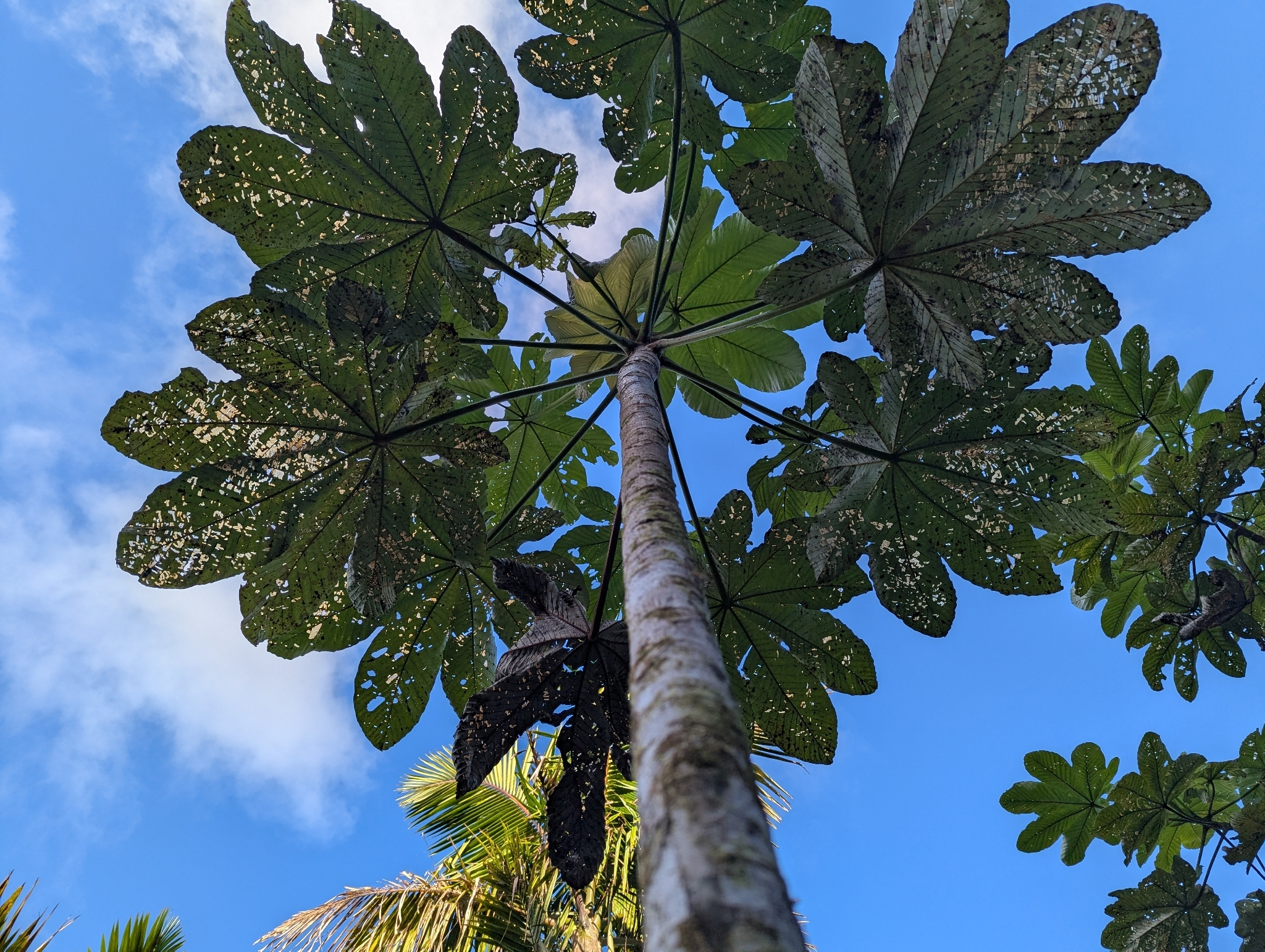

Scientific classification
- Kingdom: Plantae
- Clade: Tracheophytes
- Clade: Angiosperms
- Clade: Eudicots
- Clade: Rosids
- Order: Rosales
- Family: Urticaceae
- Genus: Cecropia
- Species: C. schreberiana

Binomial name
- Cecropia schreberiana Miq.

Synonyms
- Ambaiba schreberiana (Miq.) Kuntze; Cecropia peltata auct. non L.

= Cecropia schreberiana =

Species of tree

Cecropia schreberiana is a fast-growing tropical tree in the family Urticaceae. It is known by many different common names, including trumpetwood, pumpwood, guarumo, snakewood tree, and downgolog. It is native to the Caribbean and northern South America where it grows primarily in disturbed areas of subtropical to montane rainforest zones.

== Description ==
Cecropia schreberiana is a medium-sized tree that typically reaches 10–25 meters in height. It grows large, distinctly shaped leaves, up to 51 cm in diameter, each with 9 to 11 lobes on a long, thick petiole. The underside of each leaf is white and densely covered in short, wooly hairs. It has a straight trunk with distinctive ring-like scars from fallen leaves. The trunk and branches are usually hollow, filled with mucilage, and will exude a mucilaginous sap when damaged. The species is dioecious, with male and female flowers borne on separate trees. Flowers of both sexes are small, around 1.6 mm long, and produced in elongated spikes. The female spikes develop into fleshy, green, finger-shaped fruits around 5–10 cm long.

== Natural history ==
Cecropia schreberiana produces wind-pollinated flowers, whose fruits are consumed by birds and bats that disperse its seeds. The tree regenerates quickly and abundantly. As such, it is an important pioneer species that colonizes land destroyed by natural disasters such as hurricanes. In time, they will help to provide the shade and organic material necessary to allow other, less rugged species to survive. Outside of this range, the trumpetwood has been introduced to Malaysia, Africa, and Pacific Islands, where it rapidly invades forest canopy gaps, roadsides, lava flows, agricultural sites, urban locations, and other disturbed areas.

Cecropia schreberiana has a mutualistic relationship with ants from the genus Azteca. The biting ants inhabit the hollow stems and protect the tree from herbivores and encroaching vegetation. In return, the tree provides shelter and food in the form of glycogen-containing beads, which are produced at the base of leaf petioles.

== Uses ==
Cecropia schreberiana is used locally for its timber, which is lightweight and suitable for making crates, matchsticks, toys, plywood, and paper pulp. Latex from the trunk can be used to make rubber. The hollow stems have been made into instruments by indigenous peoples of Saint Lucia, Jamaica, and the Amazon rainforest.

The tree has many uses in traditional medicine. Its sap has been used to treat wounds, and its leaves have been smoked to alleviate asthma. Tea made from its leaves has used for colds, hypertension, back pain, kidney infections, heart conditions and nervous diseases.
