= Correbidia assimilis =

Scientific classification
- Domain: Eukaryota
- Kingdom: Animalia
- Phylum: Arthropoda
- Class: Insecta
- Order: Lepidoptera
- Superfamily: Noctuoidea
- Family: Erebidae
- Subfamily: Arctiinae
- Genus: Correbidia
- Species: C. assimilis

Binomial name
- Correbidia assimilis Rothschild, 1912

Synonyms
- Correbidia similis Rothschild, 1912

Species of moth

Correbidia assimilis is a moth of the subfamily Arctiinae. It was described by Rothschild in 1912. It is found in Venezuela and possibly Central America.
