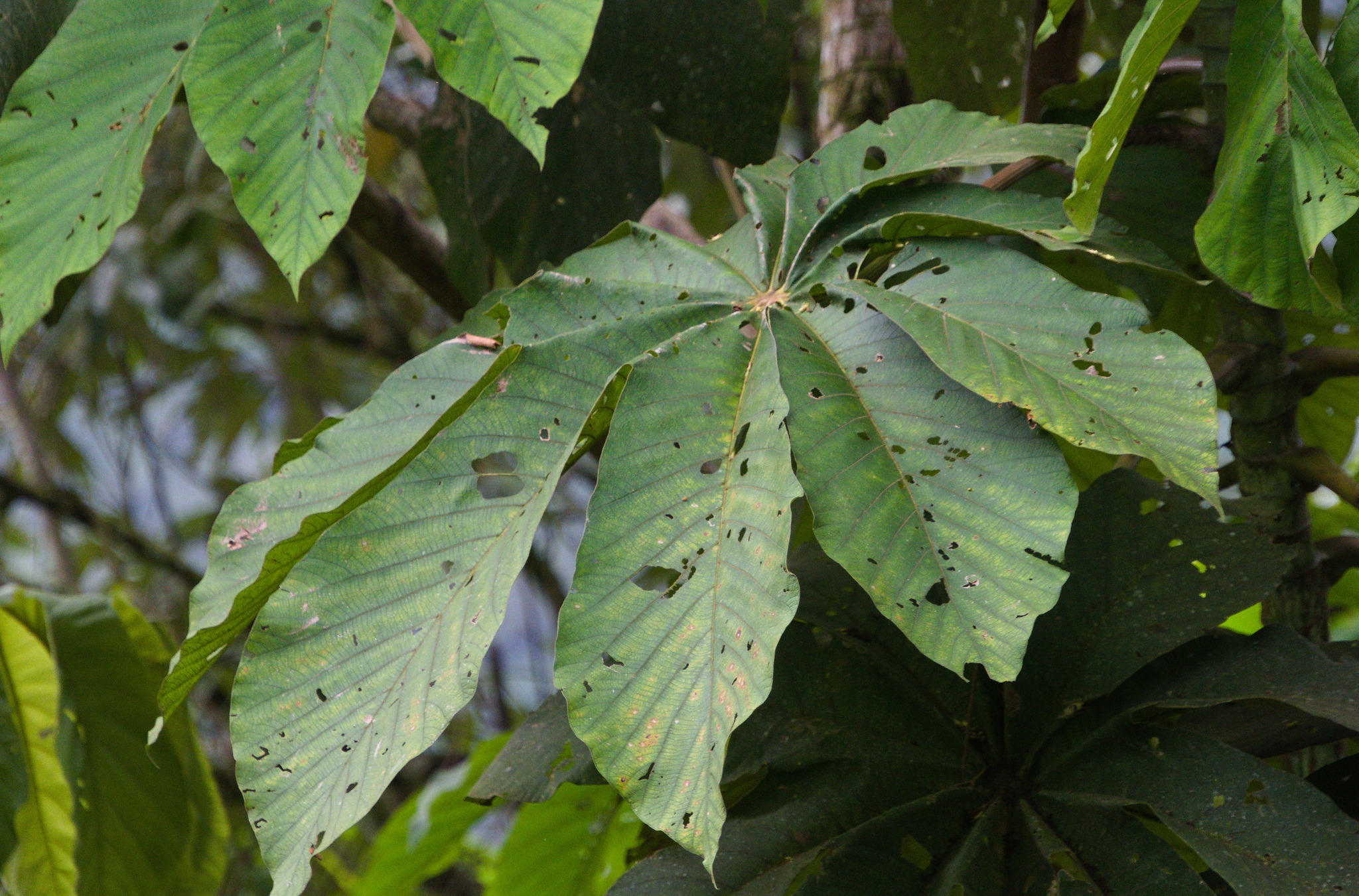

Conservation status
- Near Threatened (IUCN 3.1)

Scientific classification
- Kingdom: Plantae
- Clade: Tracheophytes
- Clade: Angiosperms
- Clade: Eudicots
- Clade: Rosids
- Order: Rosales
- Family: Urticaceae
- Genus: Cecropia
- Species: C. pastasana

Binomial name
- Cecropia pastasana Diels

= Cecropia pastasana =

Species of tree

Cecropia pastasana is a species of tree in the family Urticaceae. It is native to Colombia, Ecuador and Peru. Its natural habitats are subtropical or tropical moist lowland forests and subtropical or tropical moist montane forests. It is threatened by habitat loss.
