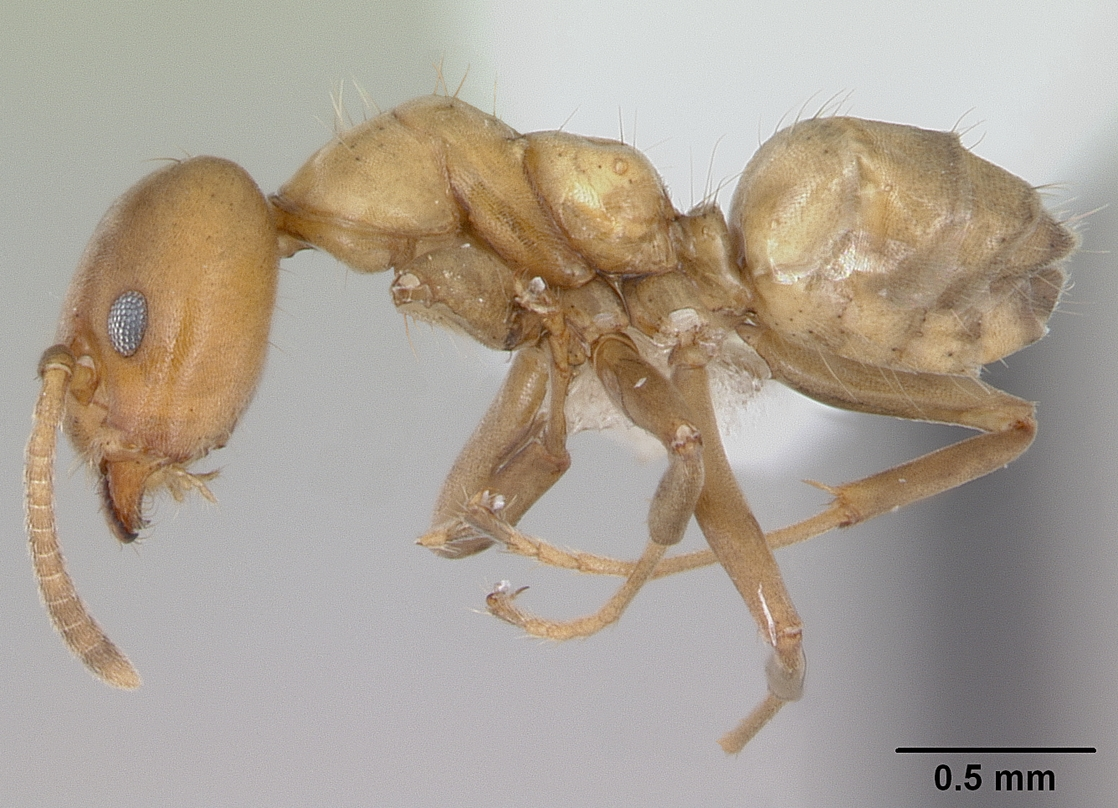

Scientific classification
- Kingdom: Animalia
- Phylum: Arthropoda
- Clade: Pancrustacea
- Class: Insecta
- Order: Hymenoptera
- Family: Formicidae
- Subfamily: Dolichoderinae
- Genus: Azteca
- Species: A. alfari

Binomial name
- Azteca alfari Emery, 1893
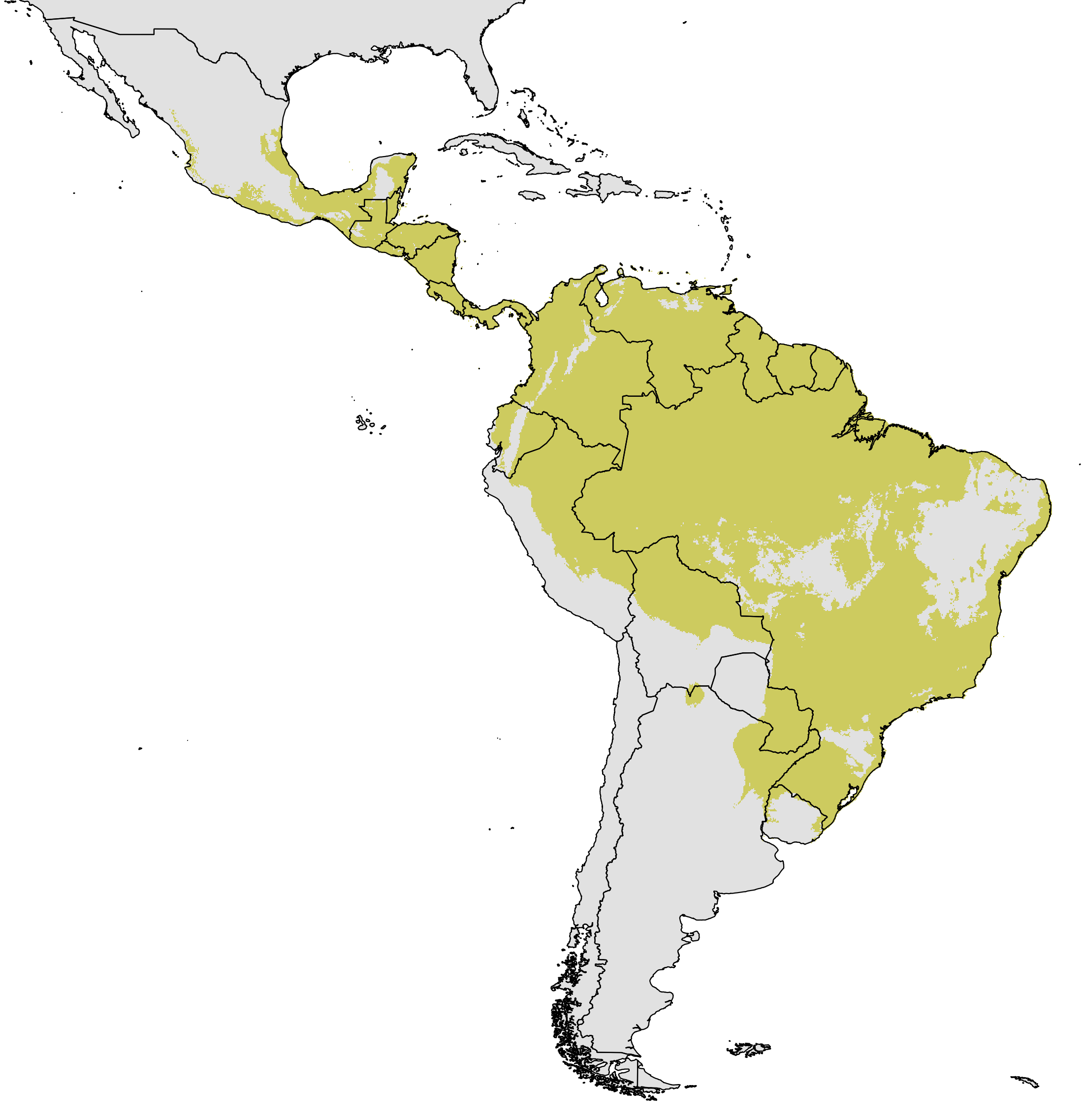

Synonyms
- List: Azteca alfari argentina Forel, 1914; Azteca alfari cecropiae Forel, 1906; Azteca alfari curtiscapa Forel, 1912; Azteca alfari langi Wheeler, W.M., 1942; Azteca alfari mixta Forel, 1908; Azteca alfaroi fumaticeps Forel, 1909; Azteca alfaroi lucidula Forel, 1899; Azteca bicolor Emery, 1893; Azteca championi breviscapa Forel, 1912; Azteca lynchi Brèthes, 1914; Azteca virens Forel, 1899

= Azteca alfari =

Species of ant

Azteca alfari is a species of ant in the genus Azteca. Described by Carlo Emery in 1893, the species is widespread in Mexico, Central and South America. This ant has a mutualistic relationship with a Cecropia tree. The specific name alfari honours a Costa Rican zoologist Anastasio Alfaro.

== Distribution and habitat ==
Azteca alfari is native to the tropical and subtropical Neotropics. Its range extends from Mexico to Bolivia, Paraguay and northern Argentina. It is an obligatory symbiont of evergreen trees in the genus Cecropia, forming colonies in the hollow stems. These trees grow in moist lowland rainforest, riparian forest, Cerrado, forest clearings and secondary forest.

== Ecology ==
A founding queen of Azteca alfari establishes a colony in a young Cecropia sapling, typically Cecropia pachystachya, having chewed her way inside a young, hollow shoot. The tree provides nourishment for the ants in the form of Müllerian bodies, glandular areas on the leaf stalks that produce oily secretions, nectar from the female flowers and pearl bodies on the surfaces of the leaves. As the tree grows, and the colony enlarges, more of the hollow branches and twigs are occupied by the ants, but the central trunk and larger branches are progressively abandoned. Some of the ant larvae develop into reproductives, which remain in the colony and start to breed, while others become workers. When the colony is small, the workers are very aggressive, protecting the tree and attacking intruders, but as the colony expands, the ants are more likely to retreat into their domatia when disturbed. Because of this, older Cecropia trees often have dilapidated foliage, are infested with other insects and foraging ants of other species, and have vines growing over them. However, if a branch of the tree is broken off, the ants still rush fiercely out from their domatia to defend the tree.
