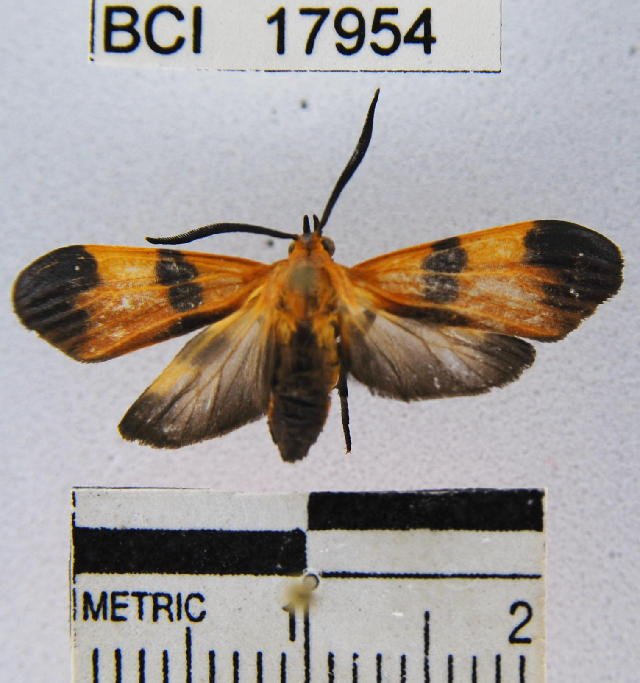

Scientific classification
- Domain: Eukaryota
- Kingdom: Animalia
- Phylum: Arthropoda
- Class: Insecta
- Order: Lepidoptera
- Superfamily: Noctuoidea
- Family: Erebidae
- Subfamily: Arctiinae
- Genus: Correbidia
- Species: C. elegans

Binomial name
- Correbidia elegans (H. Druce, 1884)

Synonyms
- Pionia elegans H. Druce, 1884

= Correbidia elegans =

Species of moth

Correbidia elegans is a moth of the subfamily Arctiinae. It was described by Herbert Druce in 1884. It is found in Mexico and Panama.

The forewings are light yellow, darker on the inner margin and with the apical spot glossy black. The hindwings are dusky hyaline, tinted with yellow near the base.
