= Anastasio Alfaro =

Costa Rican zoologist, geologist and explorer

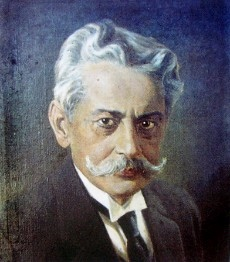
Anastasio Alfaro

Anastasio Alfaro (February 16, 1865 – January 20, 1951) was a Costa Rican zoologist, geologist and explorer.

Alfaro was director of the National Museum of Costa Rica, and whilst holding this position arranged the Costa Rican display at the Historical American Exposition in Madrid. The Limon worm salamander Oedipina alfaroi, and the Azteca alfari ant are named after him.
