= Correbidia =

Scientific classification
- Kingdom: Animalia
- Phylum: Arthropoda
- Class: Insecta
- Order: Lepidoptera
- Superfamily: Noctuoidea
- Family: Erebidae
- Subfamily: Arctiinae
- Genus: Correbidia; Hampson, 1898

Genus of moths

Correbidia is a genus of moths in the subfamily Arctiinae. The genus was erected by George Hampson in 1898.

== Species ==
- Correbidia assimilis Rothschild, 1912
- Correbidia calopteridia (Butler, 1878)
- Correbidia costinotata Schaus, 1911
- Correbidia elegans (Druce, 1884)
- Correbidia joinvillea Schaus, 1921
- Correbidia notata (Butler, 1878)
- Correbidia simonsi Rothschild, 1912
- Correbidia striata (Druce, 1884)
- Correbidia terminalis (Walker, 1856)
