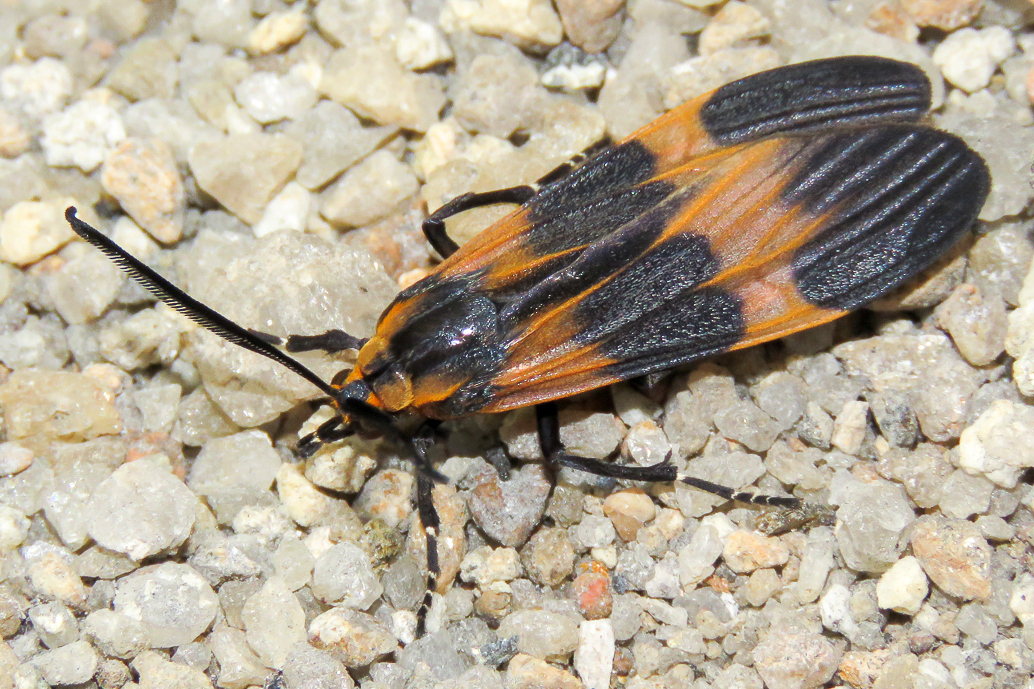

Scientific classification
- Domain: Eukaryota
- Kingdom: Animalia
- Phylum: Arthropoda
- Class: Insecta
- Order: Lepidoptera
- Superfamily: Noctuoidea
- Family: Erebidae
- Subfamily: Arctiinae
- Genus: Correbidia
- Species: C. calopteridia

Binomial name
- Correbidia calopteridia (Butler, 1878)

Synonyms
- Pionia calopteridia Butler, 1878

= Correbidia calopteridia =

Species of moth

Correbidia calopteridia is a moth of the subfamily Arctiinae. It was described by Arthur Gardiner Butler in 1878. It is found in Pará, Brazil.
