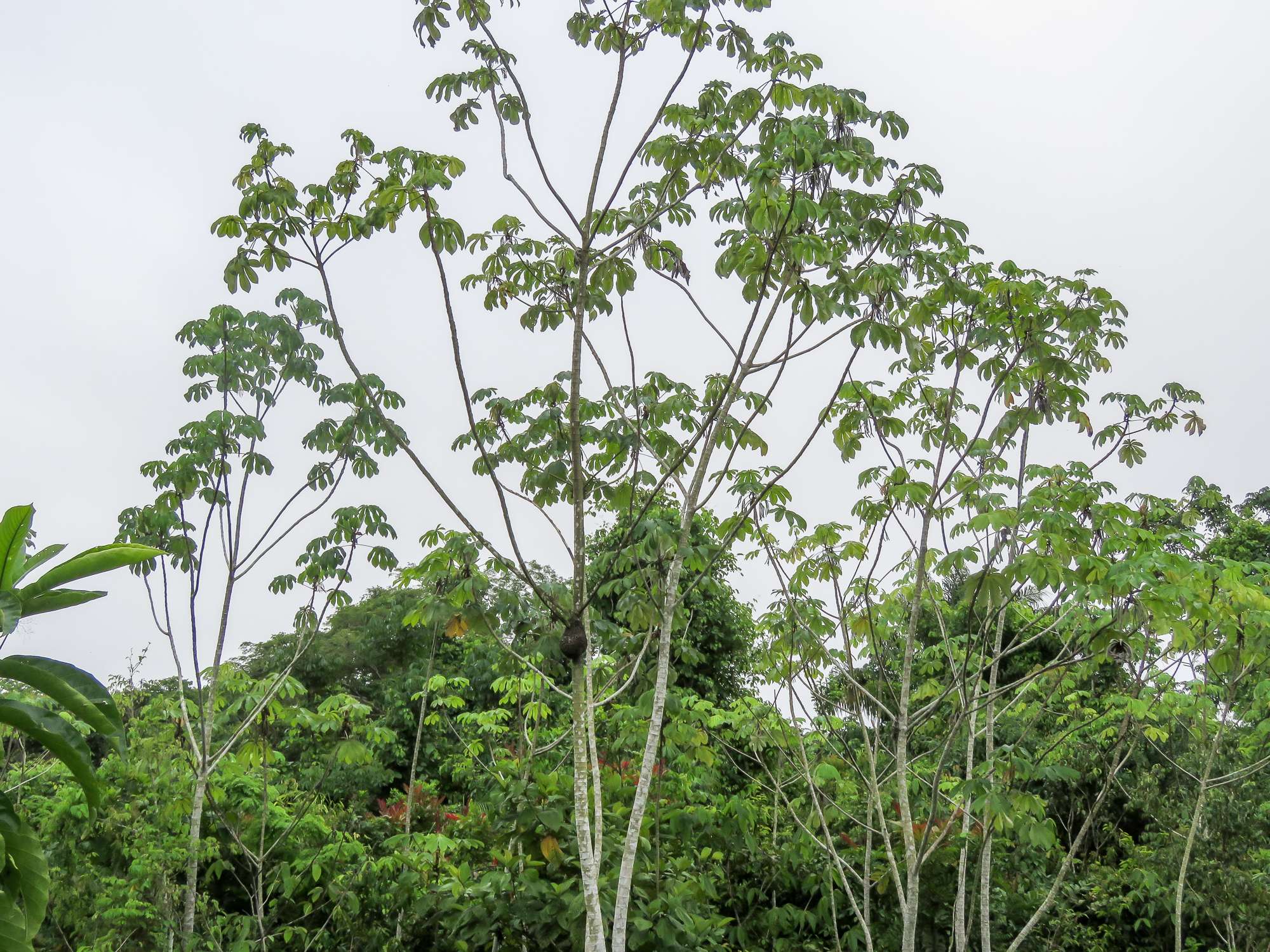
- In Brazil

Conservation status
- Least Concern (IUCN 3.1)

Scientific classification
- Kingdom: Plantae
- Clade: Tracheophytes
- Clade: Angiosperms
- Clade: Eudicots
- Clade: Rosids
- Order: Rosales
- Family: Urticaceae
- Genus: Cecropia
- Species: C. concolor

Binomial name
- Cecropia concolor Willd.

Synonyms
- List: Ambaiba concolor (Willd.) Kuntze; Ambaiba leucocoma (Miq.) Kuntze; Cecropia arenaria Warb.; Cecropia leucocoma Miq.; Cecropia maranhensis Snethl.; Cecropia obovata Rusby

= Cecropia concolor =

Species of plant

Cecropia concolor is a species of flowering plant in the family Urticaceae, native to tropical wet areas of Peru, Bolivia, and Brazil. A tree reaching 13 m (43 ft), it is usually found in open woodlands.
