= Historical American Exposition =

Exhibition

1892–1893 Madrid
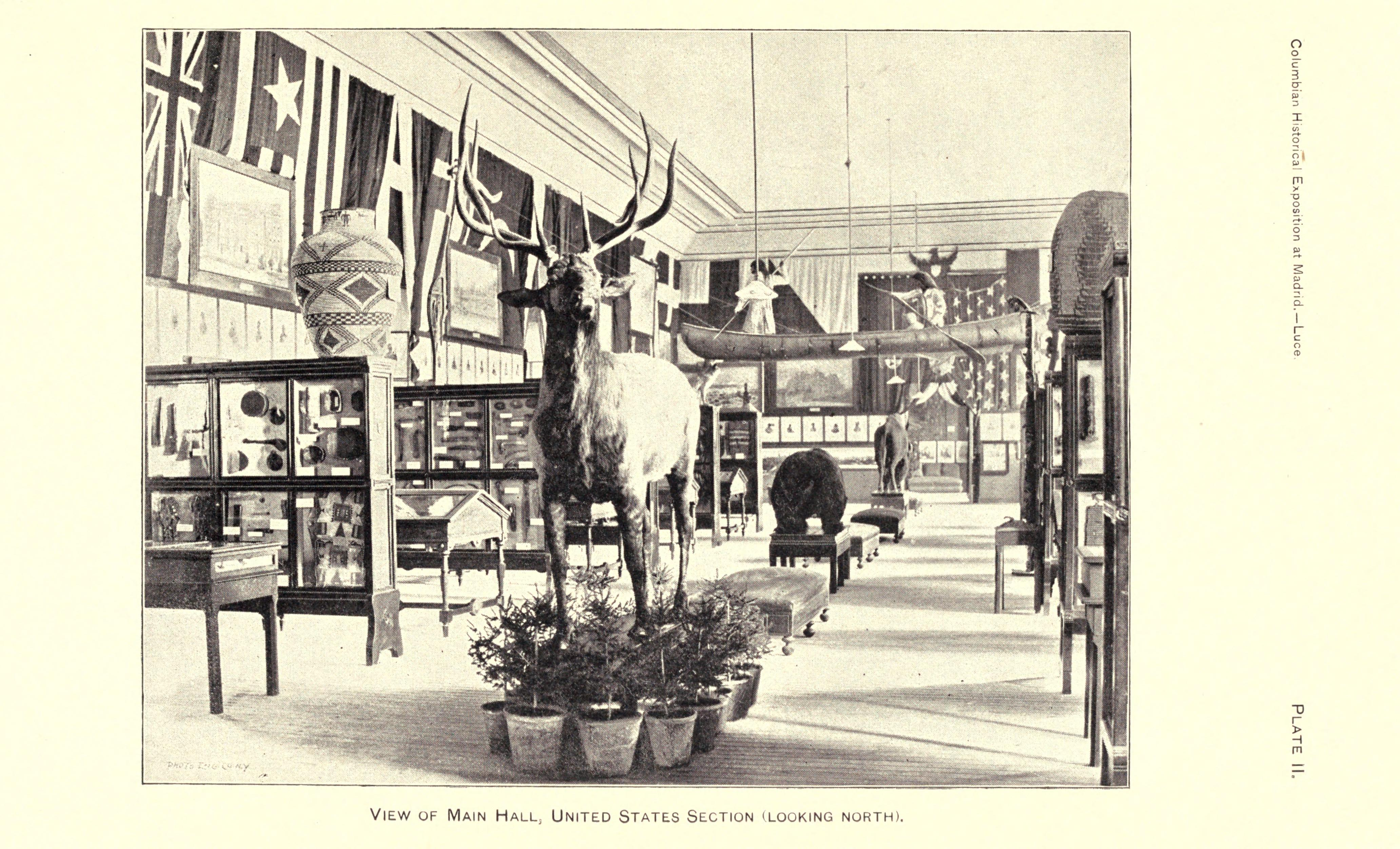
- The United States section of the main hall

Overview
- BIE-class: Unrecognized exposition
- Name: Historical American Exposition
- Building(s): Biblioteca Nacional de España/National Archaeological Museum of Spain
- Area: 5,000 square metres (0.50 ha)
- Organized by: Antonio Cánovas del Castillo

Participant(s)
- Countries: 19

Location
- Country: Spain
- City: Madrid
- Coordinates: 40.423333°N 3.688889°W

Timeline
- Opening: 30 October 1892
- Closure: 31 January 1893

The 1892 Historical American Exposition held in Madrid was intended to mark the four hundredth year of the discovery of America.

== Participants ==
Several countries including Argentina, Bolivia, Colombia, Costa Rica, Denmark, Dominican Republic, Ecuador, Germany, Guatemala, Mexico, Nicaragua, Norway, Peru, Portugal, Sweden, Uruguay and USA participated, along with the Captaincy General of Cuba and Spain herself.

=== Costa Rica ===
The Costa Rica exhibit was organised by the National Museum of Costa Rica director Anastasio Alfaro and included over 1000 relics from an 1891 excavation of a cemetery at Guayabo de Turrialba. After the Madrid exhibition, much of the Costa Rican display was taken to the 1893 World's Columbian Exposition in Chicago.

=== Mexico ===
The Mexican exhibit was curated by Francisco del Paso y Troncoso and included models of the El Tajín, Xochicalco, and Teuchitlan pyramids and of the complete Cempoala site.

=== Spain ===
The Spanish section had many artefacts loaned from the National Archaeological Museum of Spain including the Troano codex

== See also ==
- Exposición Nacional de Minería (1883)
