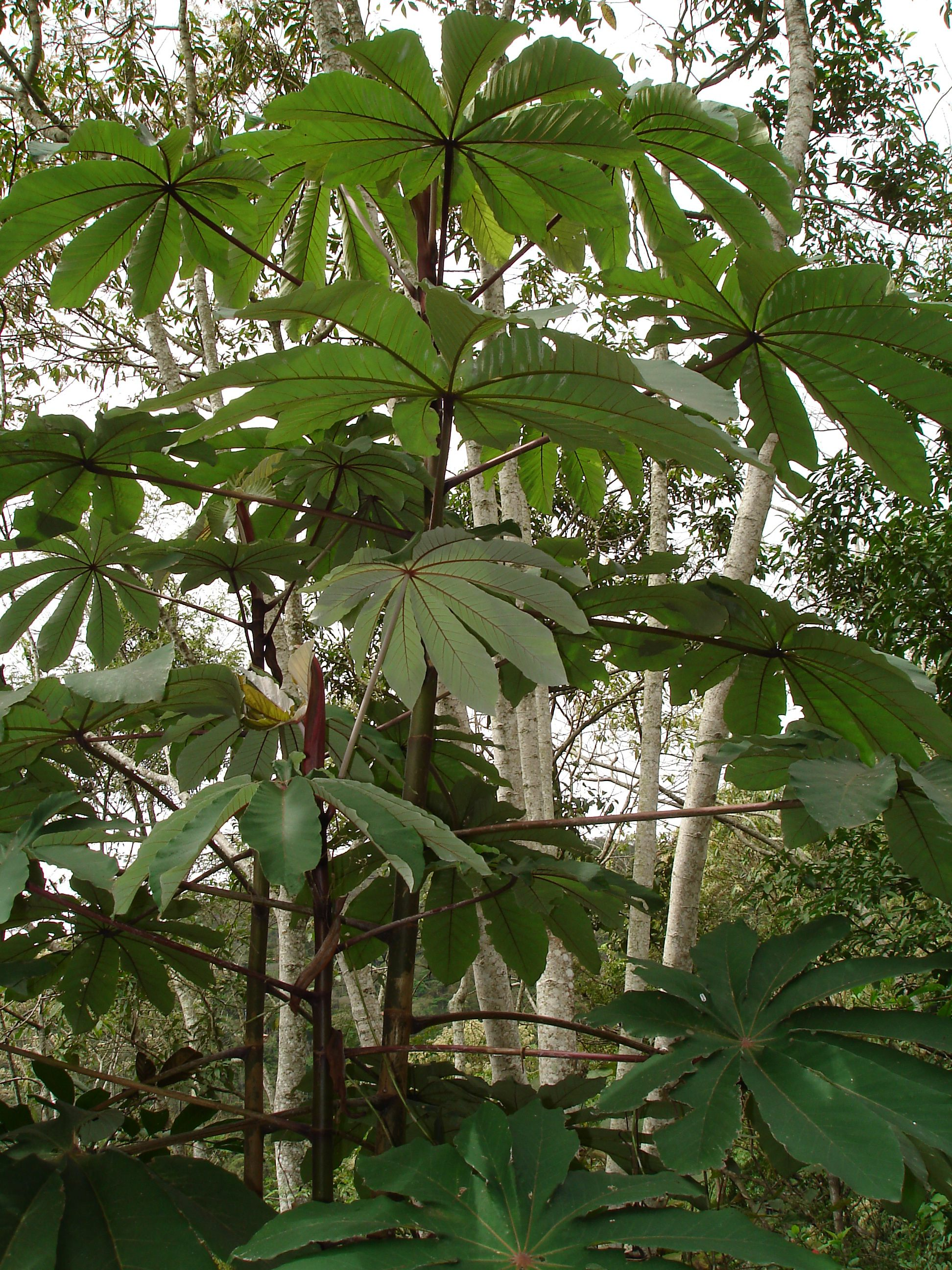
- Red cecropia, Cecropia glaziovii

Scientific classification
- Kingdom: Plantae
- Clade: Tracheophytes
- Clade: Angiosperms
- Clade: Eudicots
- Clade: Rosids
- Order: Rosales
- Family: Urticaceae
- Tribe: Cecropieae
- Genus: Cecropia; Loefl.

Species
- About 25, see text

= Cecropia =

Genus of flowering plants

Cecropia is a Neotropical genus consisting of 61 recognized species with a highly distinctive lineage of dioecious trees. The genus consists of pioneer trees in the more or less humid parts of the Neotropics, with the majority of the species being myrmecophytic. Berg and Rosselli state that the genus is characterized by some unusual traits: spathes fully enclosing the flower-bearing parts of the inflorescences until anthesis, patches of dense indumenta (trichilia) producing Müllerian bodies (food) at the base of the petiole, and anthers becoming detached at anthesis. Cecropia is most studied for its ecological role and association with ants. Its classification is controversial; in the past, it has been placed in the Cecropiaceae, Moraceae (the mulberry family), or Urticaceae (the nettle family). The modern Angiosperm Phylogeny Group system places the "cecropiacean" group in the Urticaceae.

The genus is native to the American tropics, where it is one of the most recognizable components of the rainforest. The genus is named after Cecrops I, the mythical first king of Athens. Common local names in Venezuela include yarumo or yagrumo, or more specifically yagrumo hembra ("female yagrumo") to distinguish them from the similar-looking but unrelated Didymopanax (which are called yagrumo macho, "male yagrumo"). In English, these trees are occasionally called pumpwoods (though this may also refer to C. schreberiana specifically) or simply Cecropias. Spanish-speaking countries in Central America, Mexico, the Caribbean, Colombia, Ecuador commonly use the vernacular name, guarumo.

== Taxonomic history ==
Cecropia was first recognized and accounted for by Marcgrave (1648) and Piso (1658), the latter including an illustration with characteristic features. Loefling (1758) coined the generic name Cecropia. In 1759, Linnaeus described Cecropia peltata which he applied to many species. Willdenow (1806) created C. palmate, which was also applied to a various species. Over the next decade, additional species were added by Bertoloni (1840), Martius (1841), and Liebmann (1851). Mixing of specimens was very common and a problem arose, which continues today, with many collections of Cecropia. Many species were also described by Hemsley (1883), Richter (1897), Donnell Smith (1899), Rusby (1907, 1910), Huber (1910), Robinson (1912), Pittier (1917), Bailey (1922), and the most extensive number by Snethlage (1923, 1924). Additional species were recognized by Burret (1924), Mildbread (1925, 1933), Standly (1929, 1940), Macbride (1937), Diels (1941), Standley & Steyermark (1944), and Stadley & Williems (1952).

Hans Melchior (1964) placed Cecropia in the Urticales and Moraceae (Concephaleideae) because of its woody bark. Later based on the floral characters, most notably the basal ovule and gynoecium, which appears to be formed from a single carpel, Thorne (1976) moved it to the Malvanae- Urticales, family Urticaceae. Berg (1978), however, placed it in its own family Cecropiaceae. When phylogenetic data became available, Cecropia was then moved back into the Urticaceae.

== Description ==
The genus is easily identified by its large, circular, palmately lobed leaves, about 30–40 cm in diameter and deeply divided into 7–11 lobes. The trees consist of very few branches, usually with candelabrum-like branching system. In Costa Rica, three-toed sloths are often spotted easily in Cecropia trees because of their open, leafless branches compared to other trees. Berg and Roselli state, “Branch development is often initiated in seedlings, even in the axils of the first formed (opposite) leaves; prophylls are formed, and often the development of the first leaf begins but is arrested (if the seedling is not decapitated). In the axils of the leaves formed during later development, the axillary branch primordia do not produce more than one or two prophylls and a bud.” The branches of C. garciae and C. hispidissima occur at a height of 0.6 to 1 m and the branches depart at acute angles. In most species of Cecropia, the branches depart at obtuse angles and the crown has a distinct umbrella shape.

High variation is seen in the morphology of Cecropia species, but most form small to medium-sized trees, 5–15 m tall. Although some species (C. distachya, C. herthae, C. insignis, and C. sciadophylla) grow much taller, as large as 40 m, and some (C. ulei) rarely surpass 5 m. The high degree of variation can be attributed to regional habitat differences and longevity. The family Cecropiaceae is characterized by having adventitious roots, and in Cecropia, they become stilt-roots, which are a common feature of large trees, especially living near rivers or marshes. Cecropia spp. are usually full of vines, but not normally overgrown by them. Most species have internodes that are hollow and contain whitish pith. These internodes provide a nesting area for the Azteca ants that inhabit the trees.

When the branches are cut, they release a watery, often mucilaginous sap, which turns black when it is exposed to the air. To prevent inhabitation by ants and occupation and damage by herbivorous insect larvae, the terminal buds and upper internodes are filled with mucilage. Several species' leafy twigs are covered by a waxy layer, making them bluish.

Berg and Rosselli describe in detail six types of trichomes that can be recognized on Cecropia and more information on each can be found in their paper. They are: thick unicellular hairs, thin unicellular hairs, pluricellular trichomes, cystolith hairs, pearl glands (or pearl bodies), and Müllerian bodies.

Parts of the Cecropia such as the stipules, the spathes, and the main veins of the lamina have red-coloring substances. The concentration of the substances varies, even within species, and some parts can be green, bluish, pale pink, dark red, dark purple, and even blackish. The color may fade with age, and can be deposited equally or in patterns such as longitudinal stripes.

The leaves of adult Cecropia species are large and peltate, almost circular in circumference. The lamina is attached to the petiole, the venation is radiate, and the lamina is radially incised between the radiating main veins. Variation is high in the number of lobes or leaf segments, ranging from five to more than 20.

=== Similar species ===
Pourouma bicolor is very similar in appearance to the Cecropia, with its umbrella-shaped leaves, stilt roots, large leaves with wide lobes, and whitish color on the underside. The distinctions between the two, however, are: the petiole attaches at the base of the leaf rather than at the center of the leaf like Cecropia and Pourouma has leaf lobes that are triangular and pointed at the tip, whereas most Cecropia are rounded.

== Habitat and distribution ==
Between 40 and 50% of the 61 species of Cecropia are montane or submontane Andean, with the majority of species in the northern part of the Andes, in Colombia and Ecuador. The Andean region is regarded as the center of species richness and speciation because of the additional 25% of lowland taxa that reach the eastern or western foothills of the Andes. Therefore, only about 25% of the species occur outside of the Andean region. A map of the distribution of Cecropia can be found in the article written by Berg and Rosselli, 2005. Most species of Cecropia are lowland humid/rainforest species occurring from sea level to 1,300 m in altitude, while submontane species occupy an altitudinal range from 1,300-2,000 m, and montane species are found in cloud forest from 2,000-2,600 m. Many species have a narrow altitudinal and ecological niche, with certain species specializing in specific habitats, such as seasonally inundated habitats, rocky slopes, swamps, natural or man-made clearings, etc.

Species in the genus Cecropia are some of the most abundant pioneer tree species in natural tree-fall gaps inside primary forests. Its geographic distribution extends along the Pacific and Atlantic Mexican coasts and in Central and South American forests, and are found over an elevation range of 0 to 2,600 m. Cecropia species are among the most abundant pioneers of other neotropical forests. It is native to the Neotropics and occurs as an introduced exotic plant elsewhere. In most low-elevation, wet regions of the Neotropics, Cecropia trees are ubiquitous and important invaders of man-made clearings.

The species C. pachystachya and C. peltata are invasive species in Old World localities including Singapore, Cameroon, Java, Malaysia, Ivory Coast, French Polynesia, and Hawaii. C. peltata has been nominated as one of the “100 of the World’s Worst Invasive Alien Species” by the Global Invasive Species Database. C. peltata was introduced to the Singapore Botanic Gardens in 1902 and has spread widely throughout Singapore along with C. pachystachya, which was introduced in the 1960s. The species is successful as an invasive species because of its ability to pollinate without the need for pollinators, the possible preferential liking for its fruits by frugivorous birds, and its lack of natural predators.

== Reproduction ==
Cecropia species have staminate and pistillate flowers on separate trees, more commonly referred to as a dioecious species. The fruits are achenes enveloped by a fleshy perianths, oblongoid, elliptic, subobovoid or subovoid. The pericarp is tuberculate in most species, although it is smooth in some species. Seeds can be viable for more than five years and germinate when triggered by full sunlight and changing temperatures. Full-grown Cecropia trees can produce up to a million seeds, and this regular presence of fruits allows this genus to play a major role in the ecosystem. It is often the keystone food supply for frugivorous animals, such as birds, fruit bats, monkeys, opossums, and even fish.

=== Pollination and dispersal ===
Traits of the staminate flowers and inflorescences are adapted to wind pollination- either by pendulous spikes, which can be moved by the wind to shed the pollen or by the special adaptation of detachment of anthers, and their secondary attachment allowing the shedding of pollen by motion of anthers. The dryness and its easy release by movement make it ideal for wind pollination. Wind pollination is the dominant form, but insects, small beetles, and flies can be pollinators. In the Neotropics, toucans and other birds help disperse the seeds of species with short infructescences, while bats are associated with species with long peduncles and spikes. Species growing near rivers, though, are usually dispersed by water.

== Conservation ==
Cecropia spp. are generally not endangered; so no major conservation efforts are in place. Their abundance increases temporarily with the clearing of forest or creation of gaps.

== Ecology ==
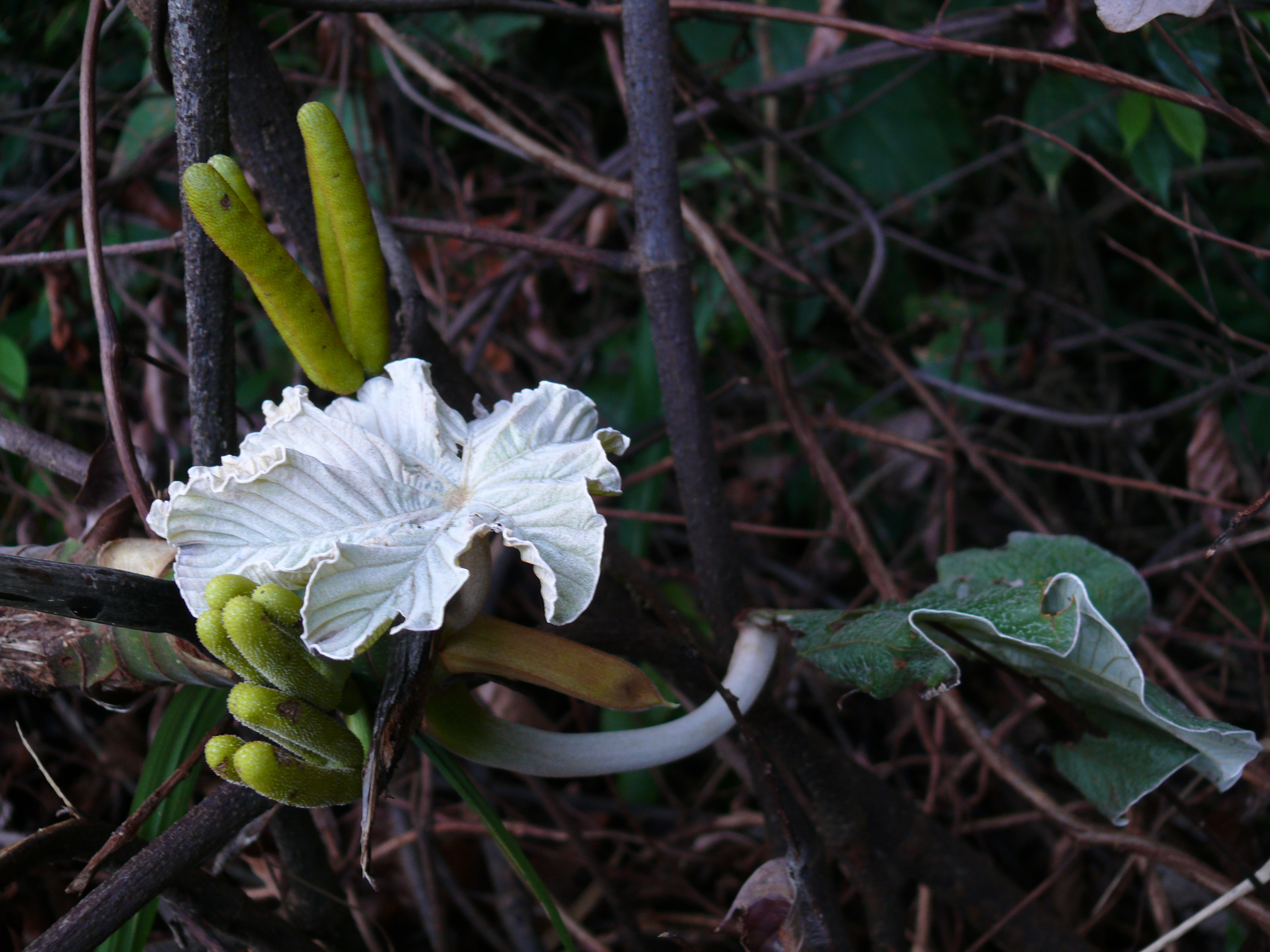
Young Cecropia sp., Kourou, French Guiana

Cecropia species are used as food plants by the larvae of some Lepidoptera species, including the arctiid moth Hypercompe icasia. The leaves and buds are also eaten by sloths as their main source of food, but many herbivores avoid these plants; most Cecropia spp. are myrmecophytes, housing dolichoderine ants of the genus Azteca, which vigorously defend their host plants against getting eaten. This symbiosis has been studied extensively by biologists such as Daniel Janzen.

Cecropia fruit, known as snake fingers, are a popular food of diverse animals, including bats like the common fruit bat (Artibeus jamaicensis) and short-tailed fruit bat, the Central American squirrel monkey (Saimiri oerstedii), and birds such as the green aracari (Pteroglossus viridis), the keel-billed toucan (Ramphastos sulfuratus), the peach-fronted conure (Eupsittula aurea), the bare-throated bellbird (Procnias nudicollis) and particularly nine-primaried oscines. The seeds are not normally digested, so these animals are important in distributing the trees. Some birds – e.g. the common potoo (Nyctibius griseus) – nest in Cecropia trees. The elfin-woods warbler (Setophaga angelae) is notable for using Cecropia leaves as nesting material, which no other New World warbler (family Parulidae) seems to do.

=== Pioneer species ===
Cecropia is a major pioneer tree genus in regions of the Neotropics with wet lowland and montane forest. These trees are characteristic features of many American tropical rainforest ecosystems and may be among the dominant tree species in some places. Being aggressive, rapid-growth trees, whose succulent fruits are readily sought by various animals, they tend to be among the first pioneer species to occupy former forest areas cleared for pasture or altered by human activity. C. hololeuca, known in Brazil as "silver cecropia", has broad, silver-hued leaves that make it desirable as an ornamental plant for landscaping projects, as is the case with the similar species C. pachystachya. Greenhouse experiments have been performed with some species of Cecropia indicating them as “gap” and “pioneer” species under different light regimens and nutrient treatments. Some species (C. maxima, C. tacuna, C. telealba, and C. telenitida) do not show the traits of pioneer species, though, as they occur evenly in the forest. The pioneer Cecropia species have a higher demand for light, occur in open habitats, relatively rapid growth rates, and short-lived leaves. According to McKey's theory, these pioneer species tend to invest more heavily in pearl bodies and less heavily in Mullerian bodies than more shade-tolerant species with slower intrinsic growth rates and longer leaf lifespans. In the small light gaps (which are more shaded than normal), the most distinctive myrmecophytic Cecropia spp, are found.

=== Myrmecophytism ===
Species of Cecropia often display myrmecophytism as a form of biotic defense. D.W. Davidson said,

“In all the world, the genus Cecropia is unrivaled for the number of myrmecophytes, or true “ant-plants” counted among its species. Based on the proportion of Cecropia species producing Mullerian bodies in at least some parts of their distribution, myrmecophytes comprise the vast majority (80%) of species in the genus; most nonmyrmecophytes occur at higher elevations and on islands, where their ants are missing.” (Berg, Rosselli and Davidson, 2005: page 214)

Myrmecophytism is a mutualistic relationship formed with ant colonies, where the ants protect the tree from herbivory and the trees provide shelter and food for the ants. Along with protection against herbivory, the ants also prevent the Cecropia from encroaching vines and other plants. This may vary between or within species and over geographical locations. The main ants found living in Cecropia are different species of Azteca ants, although all ants belong to the same family, the Formicidae. The genus Azteca is endemic to the New World and its greatest abundance is in the lowland tropics. In the article written by Davidson, 2005 on page 221, Table 1 contains known obligate Cecropia-ants listed by species and geographic distribution. Ants and Cecropia have coadapted to each other, meaning that each species has evolved one or more traits in response to selective pressures exerted by the other. An example is the recognition and use of both prostomata and Mullerian bodies by queens and worker ants.

== Use ==
The wood from Cecropia trees is used by local people mainly to make musical instruments and tool handles. Flutes and guitars are commonly made of Cecropia wood. In addition, the wood is used for production of matches and cheap boxes. An attempt was made to use the wood to produce paper, but the wood pulp was too high in resin and it was not suitable. The fibers of the bark can be twisted into rope and the ropes are manufactured for bowstrings and hammocks. The leaves can also be burned and the ashes mixed in with roasted and powdered coca leaves to be placed between the cheek and gum under the tongue as “dip”.

The main human use of Cecropia trees is planting them in soil erosion-prone areas. The trees make few demands on the soil and grow very quickly. The trees are used in clear-cut areas because they retain the soil, create new biomass, and allow other types of plants to settle in the area. Berg and Rosselli stated that decoctions of leaves are made to stimulate the cardiac system, to treat asthma and pneumonia, to treat diabetes and as a diuretic. Powder of leaves is used for control of Parkinson's disease and extract of roots is used to heal wounds or eczema.

Red Cecropia (C. glaziovii) shows antidepressant-like activity in rats. Native peoples use Cecropia for food, firewood, and in herbalism; some species also have cultural significance. In Trinidad and Tobago, C. peltata root is chewed and given to dogs that have been bitten by venomous snakes as an emergency remedy (although there is no strong scientific evidence that this is useful). Cecropia leaves can be used as a substitute for sandpaper. In western South America, Cecropia leaf ash is used in the traditional preparation of ypadu, a mild coca-based stimulant. Cecropia bark can be used in rope making and in tannery. Cecropia wood is used in the manufacture of boxes, toys, aeromodeling models, and rafts.

== Pharmaceutical applications ==
So far, no pharmaceuticals in the North or South American markets are based on Cecropia species. However, scientists in Brazil have been studying the preparation of pharmaceutical products containing mainly C. glaziovii extracts. The preparation of pellets by extrusion-spheronization and polymeric nanoparticles has been reported.

== Selected species ==
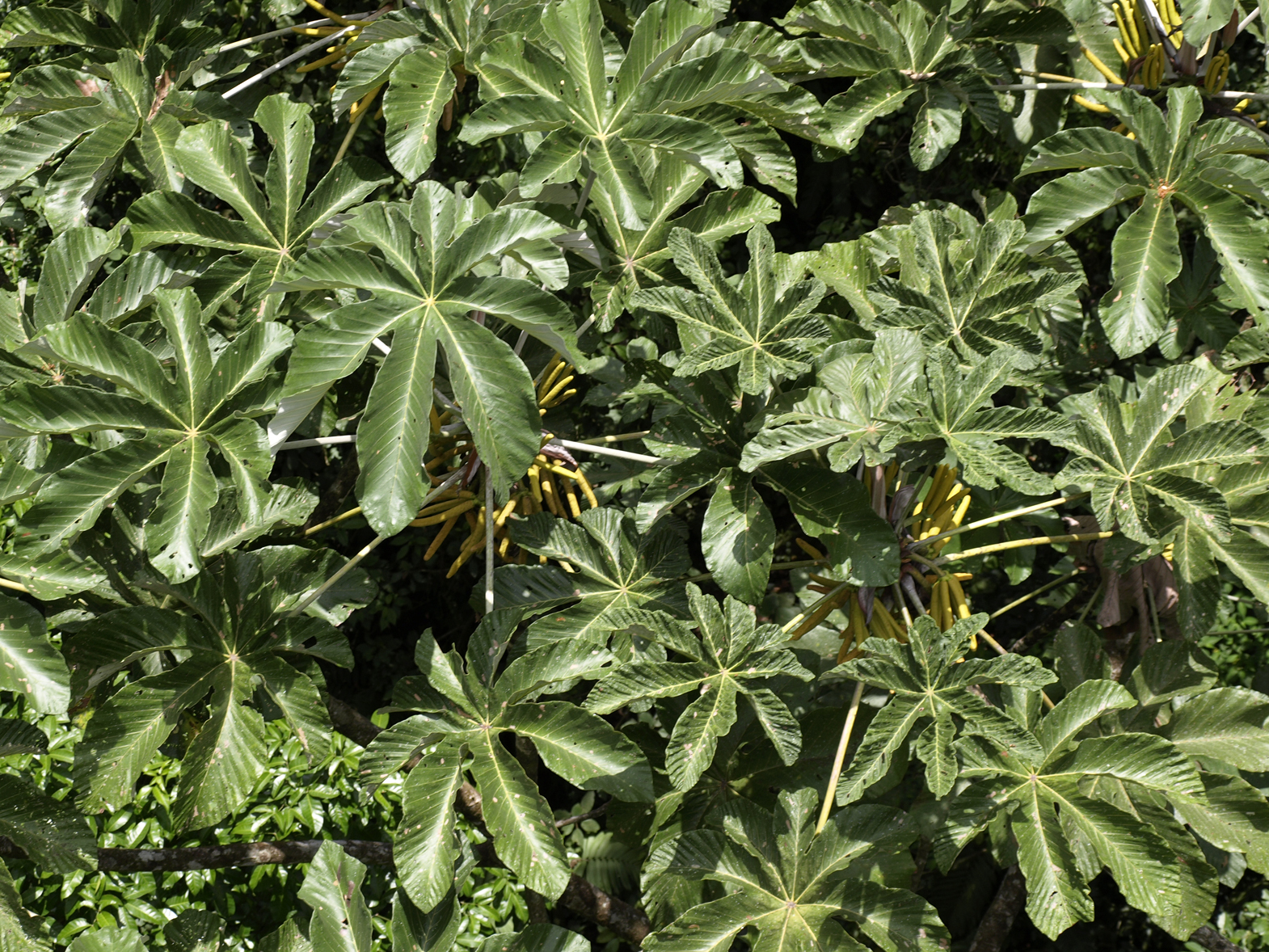
Cecropia insignis foliage

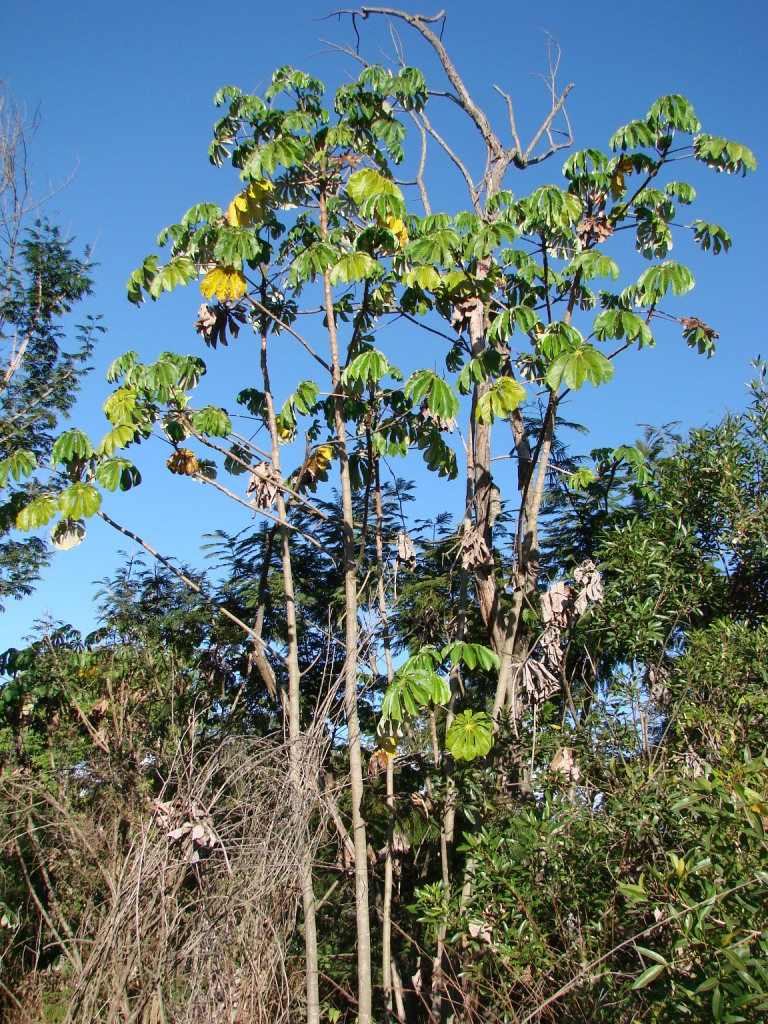
Ambay pumpwood, Cecropia pachystachya

- Cecropia angustifolia Trécul
- Cecropia concolor Willd.
- Cecropia glaziovii Snethl. – red cecropia
- Cecropia hololeuca Miq.
- Cecropia insignis Liebm.
- Cecropia longipes
- Cecropia lyratiloba Miq.
- Cecropia maxima
- Cecropia maxonii
- Cecropia multiflora
- Cecropia myrtluca
- Cecropia obtusa Trécul
- Cecropia obtusifolia
- Cecropia pachystachya Trécul – Ambay pumpwood, ambay (= C. adenopus)
- Cecropia palmata Willd.
- Cecropia pastasana
- Cecropia peltata L. – Shield-leaved pumpwood, bois canôt, "trumpet tree"
- Cecropia pittieri
- Cecropia polyphlebia
- Cecropia polystachya Trécul
- Cecropia schreberiana Miq.
  - Cecropia schreberiana ssp. antillarum (Snethl.) C.C.Berg & P.Franco (= C. antillarum)
  - Cecropia schreberiana ssp. schreberiana
- Cecropia sciadophylla Mart.
- Cecropia utcubambana
- Cecropia velutinella
