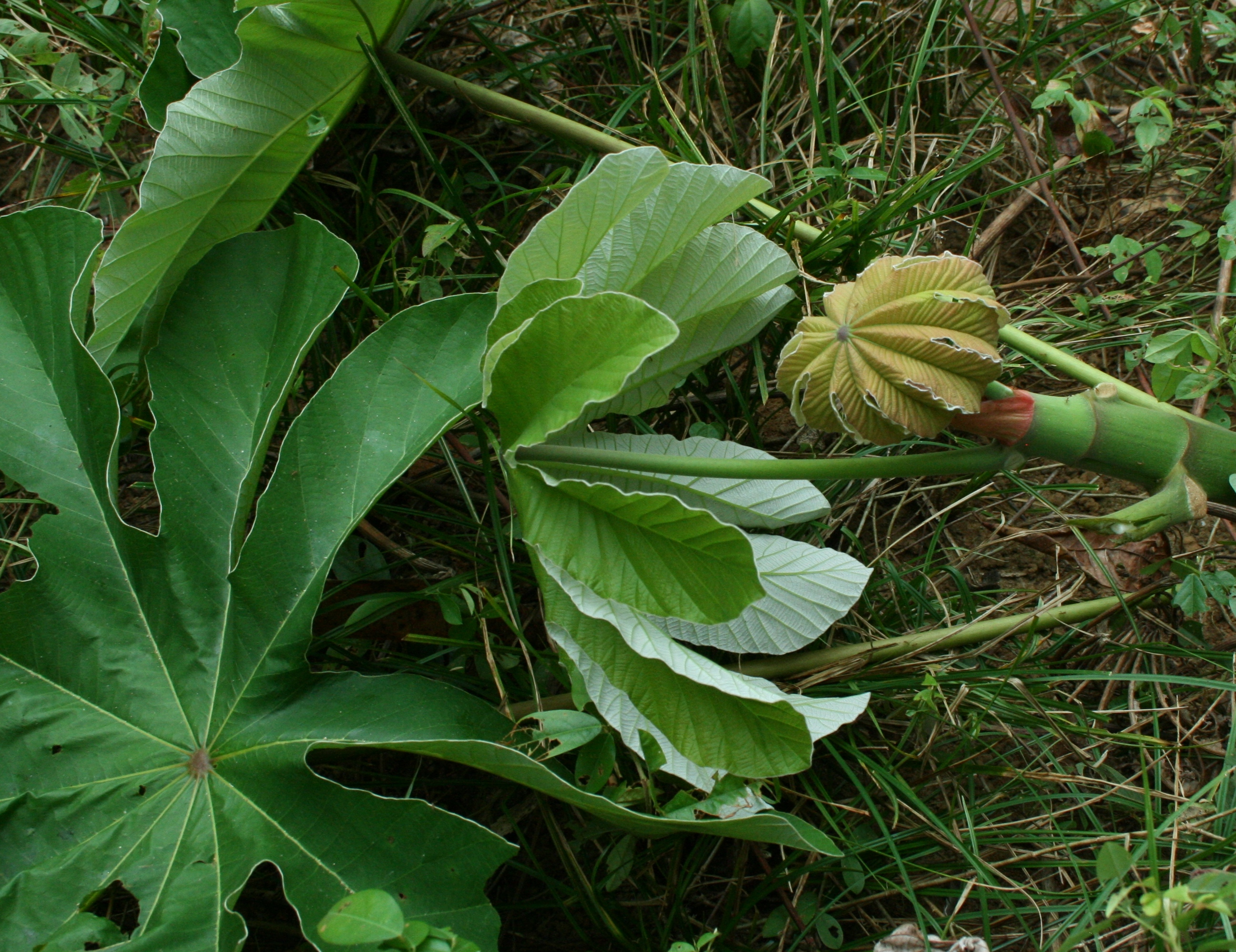

Conservation status
- Least Concern (IUCN 3.1)

Scientific classification
- Kingdom: Plantae
- Clade: Embryophytes
- Clade: Tracheophytes
- Clade: Angiosperms
- Clade: Eudicots
- Clade: Rosids
- Order: Rosales
- Family: Urticaceae
- Genus: Cecropia
- Species: C. peltata

Binomial name
- Cecropia peltata Linnaeus, 1759

= Cecropia peltata =

Species of tree

Cecropia peltata is a fast-growing tree in the nettle family Urticaceae. Common names include trumpet tree, trumpet-bush, bacano, bois canon and snakewood. It is listed as one of the world's 100 worst invasive alien species.

== Description ==
Cecropia peltata is a fast-growing tree, normally reaching 15 metres (49 ft), but occasionally growing up to 25 metres (82 ft) tall. The leaves are large – 10–60 centimetres (4–24 in) in length and width, but more commonly about 20 × 20 centimetres (8 in) and palmately divided into 7–11 (but generally 8–10) lobed. The upper surfaces of the leaves are scaled, while the lower surfaces are covered with minute hair, interspersed with longer ones. The petioles are generally 20–50 centimetres (8–20 in) long, while the branches are green and covered with short, stiff hairs.

Like other members of the genus, C. peltata is dioecious – there are separate male and female plants. Male flowers, which are 1–1.5 millimetres (0.039–0.059 in) long, are borne in spikes 10–60 centimetres (4–24 in) long. The male inflorescence is enclosed in a spathe which splits open and drops off once the anthers mature. The female flowers are borne in paired spikes 3–5 centimetres (1.2–2.0 in) long. The fruit, which is about 2 millimetres (0.079 in) long, is an achene which is enclosed in a fleshy jacket which forms from the perianth.

== Taxonomy ==
The species was described by Carl Linnaeus in the 1759 edition of Systema Naturae. It was the first species to be described in the genus and was originally applied to many species of Cecropia. As additional species were described, the usage narrowed. The genus was placed in the family Urticaceae by Adolf Engler in 1889. E. J. H. Corner suggested moving the genus to the Urticaceae in 1962, while Cornelis Berg placed Cecropia in its own family, the Cecropiaceae. Based on molecular data, the Angiosperm Phylogeny Group merged the family back into the Urticaceae.

== Distribution ==
Cecropia peltata ranges from southern Mexico through Central America to northern South America, Guyana, Trinidad and Tobago, Puerto Rico, and Jamaica, and has been introduced in Africa, Asia and the Pacific. The species has been listed as one of the hundred worst invasive alien species by the Invasive Species Specialist Group. Replacement of its very close ecological analogue, the native African Musanga cecropioides, by C. peltata has been reported along major roads of Cameroon.
