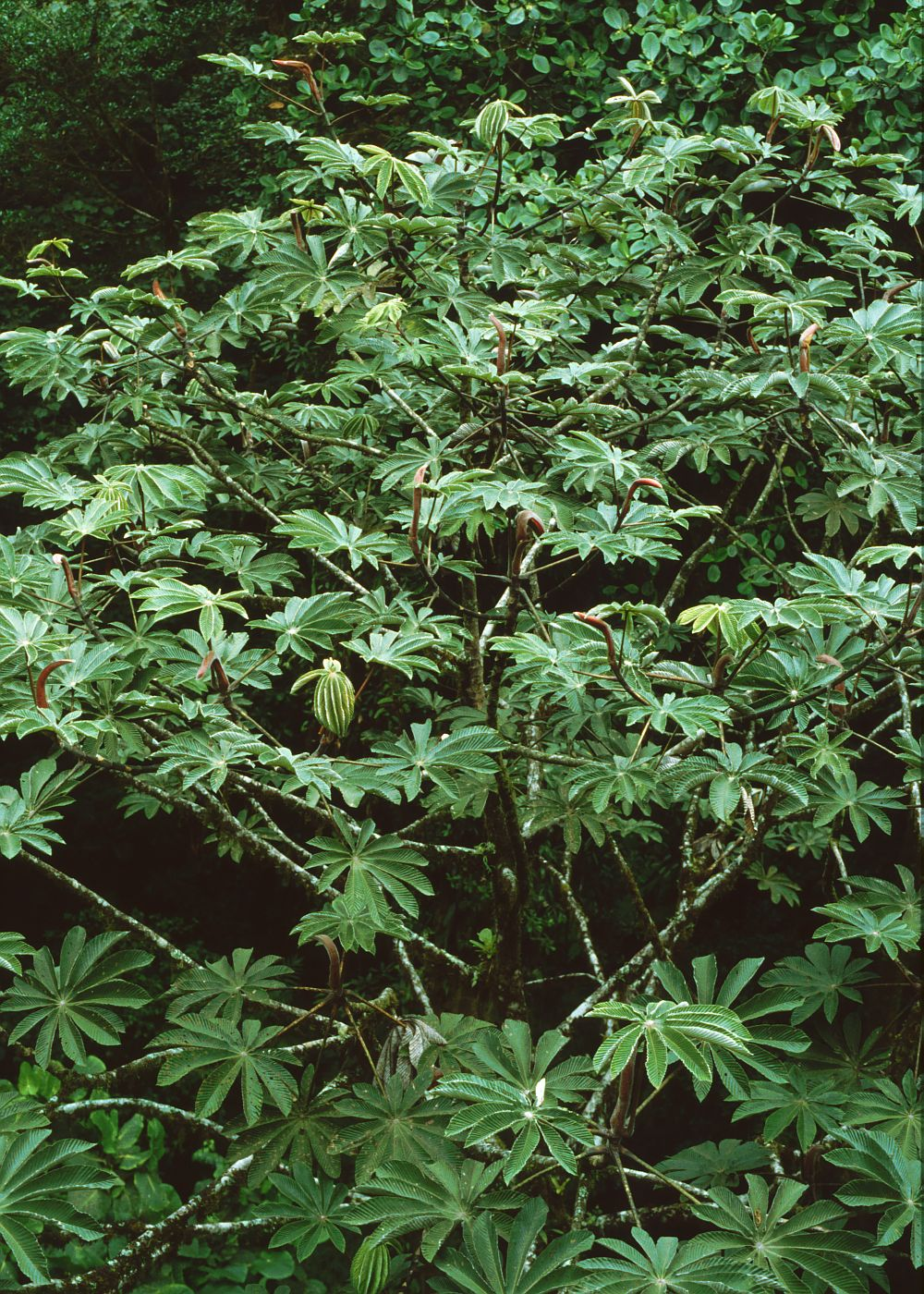

Conservation status
- Least Concern (IUCN 3.1)

Scientific classification
- Kingdom: Plantae
- Clade: Tracheophytes
- Clade: Angiosperms
- Clade: Eudicots
- Clade: Rosids
- Order: Rosales
- Family: Urticaceae
- Genus: Cecropia
- Species: C. angustifolia

Binomial name
- Cecropia angustifolia Trécul

Synonyms
- Synonymy: Ambaiba acutifolia (Trécul) Kuntze; Ambaiba digitata (Klotzsch) Kuntze; Ambaiba tubulosa (Ruiz ex Klotzsch) Kuntze; Cecropia acutifolia Trécul; Cecropia caucana Cuatrec.; Cecropia coriacea Cuatrec.; Cecropia danielis Cuatrec.; Cecropia digitata Klotzsch; Cecropia hachensis Cuatrec.; Cecropia moniquirana Cuatrec.; Cecropia palmatisecta Cuatrec.; Cecropia philipsonii Cuatrec.; Cecropia polyphlebia Donn.Sm.; Cecropia strigilosa Cuatrec.; Cecropia sylvicola Standl. & Steyerm.; Cecropia tubulosa Ruiz ex Klotzsch; Cecropia villosa C.C.Berg & P.Franco; Cecropia villosa subsp. polycephala C.C.Berg

= Cecropia angustifolia =

Species of plant

Cecropia angustifolia is a species of flowering plant in the family Urticaceae. It is a tree which ranges from Puebla and Oaxaca in southern Mexico through Central America to Venezuela and Bolivia in South America.

C. angustifolia grows 7–15 meters tall, and flowers from January to April, as well as in July, September, November and December. It differs from other species of Cecropia in not having an ant mutualism on its stems.

It grows in lowland rain forest and in wet, pluvial, and cloud premontane to montane forests and montane oak forests, mainly in secondary forests, clearings, and at forest edges, from 465 to 2,400 meters elevation.

It is used as a street tree in a number of Colombian cities.
