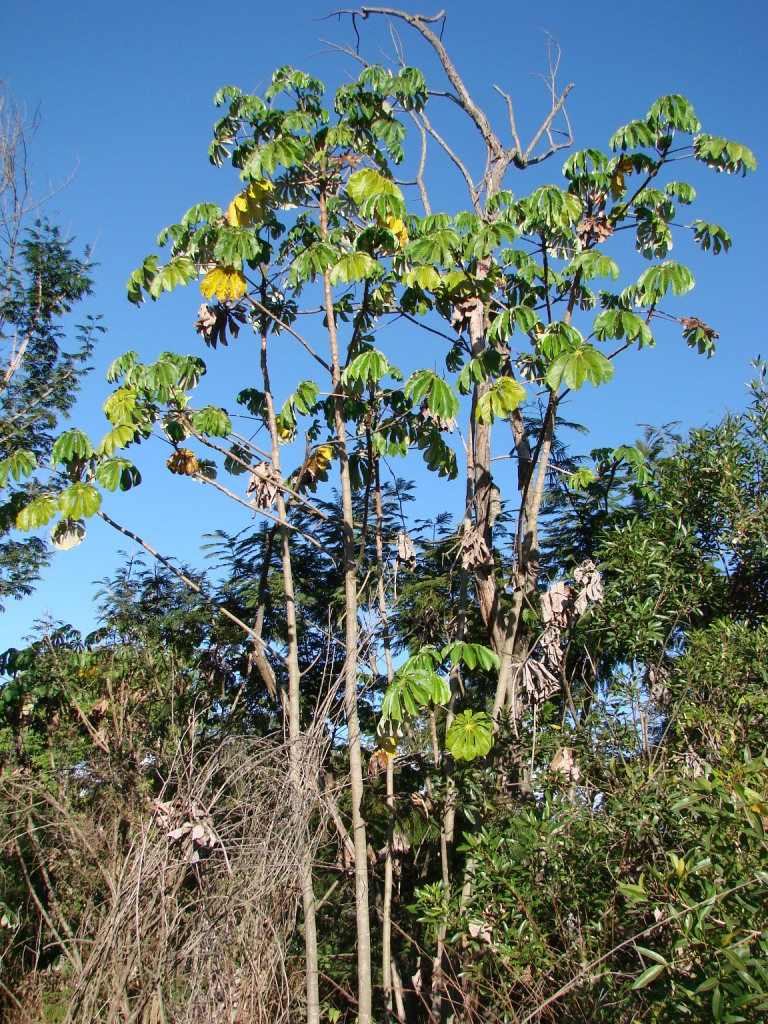

Scientific classification
- Kingdom: Plantae
- Clade: Tracheophytes
- Clade: Angiosperms
- Clade: Eudicots
- Clade: Rosids
- Order: Rosales
- Family: Urticaceae
- Genus: Cecropia
- Species: C. pachystachya

Binomial name
- Cecropia pachystachya Trécul

Synonyms
- List: Ambaiba adenopus (Mart. ex Miq.) Kuntze; Ambaiba carbonaria (Mart. ex Miq.) Kuntze; Ambaiba cinerea (Miq.) Kuntze; Ambaiba cyrtostachya (Miq.) Kuntze; Ambaiba lyratiflora (Miq.) Kuntze; Ambaiba pachystachya (Trec.) Kuntze; Ambaiba tenoreana Kuntze; Cecropia adenopus Mart. ex Miq.; Cecropia adenopus var. lyratiloba (Miq.) Hassl.; Cecropia adenopus var. macrophylla Hassl.; Cecropia carbonaria Mart. ex Miq.; Cecropia catarinensis Cuatrec.; Cecropia cinerea Miq.; Cecropia cyrtostachya Miq.; Cecropia glauca Rojas Acosta; Cecropia lyratiloba Miq.; Cecropia lyratiloba var. nana J.C.de Andrade & J.P.Pereira Carauta; Cecropia peltata Vell.

= Cecropia pachystachya =

Species of tree

Cecropia pachystachya, commonly known as Ambay pumpwood, is a species of tree in the family Urticaceae. It is native to Argentina, Paraguay, Bolivia and Brazil where it grows near the edges of moist forests.

== Description ==
Cecropia pachystachya is a small evergreen tree growing to a height of about 6 m (20 ft), and a trunk diameter of 15 to 25 cm (6 to 10 in). The tree has an open structure, with a small number of branches forking at an obtuse angle, and often forms a parasol-like shape. The twigs are hollow and are filled with mucilage, and both twigs and branches exude a mucilaginous sap when damaged. The large leaves are almost circular, and are deeply divided into nine to ten lobes which are separated by gaps of two or three centimetres. The upper surfaces of the leaves are rough and the lower surfaces are felted with pale-coloured hairs. It is a dioecious species, male and female flowers occurring on separate trees. The tree has a mutualistic relationship with ants from the genus Azteca which protect the tree from herbivory. To facilitate this, it provides nourishment for the ants in the form of Müllerian bodies, glandular areas on the leaf stalks that produce oily secretions, nectar from the female flowers and pearl bodies on the surfaces of the leaves.

== Distribution and habitat ==
This tree mostly found in Brazil, Bolivia, Paraguay and Argentina at altitudes of up to about 1,000 m (3,300 ft). It grows near the margins of humid primary forests and in clearings and secondary growth forests. It is a pioneering, fast-growing but short-lived species that sprouts readily in recently cleared areas of forest.

== Uses ==
Cecropia pachystachya is used locally for its timber, which is lightweight and suitable for making toys, boxes, pencils and plywood. Fibres from the bark are used for making sails and the mucilage can be used to make glue.

The tree has many uses in traditional medicine and contains a number of bioactive compounds. The leaves have anti-inflammatory properties and have shown antibacterial activity in the laboratory against various bacteria. The leaves and other parts of the tree are used to treat respiratory complaints, oedema, kidney disorders, diabetes, Parkinson's disease and high blood pressure, as well as a number of other conditions.
