= Pearl body =

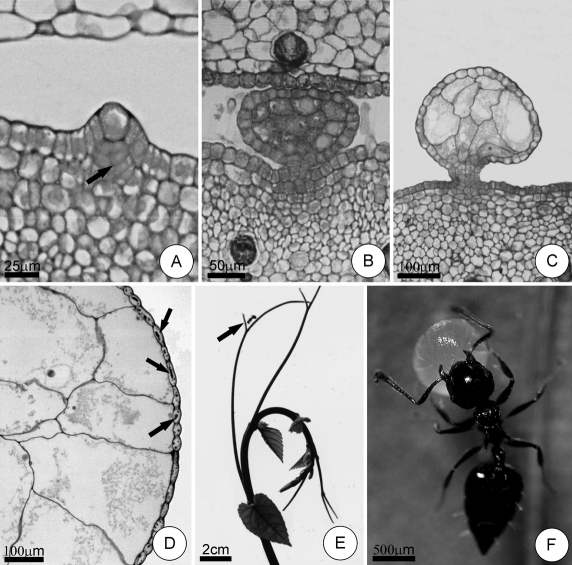
Food bodies of Cissus verticillata. (A–C) Ontogenesis of the food bodies. In (A), the initial stage of differentiation of these structures can be seen, and the first divisions of the subjacent tissues can be observed (arrow). (D) Detail of a mature food body, note the large volumes of the internal cells and the presence of plates of pectic compounds in the protoplast of the epidermal cells (arrows). (E) Apical portion of a branch with an ant patrolling a twig (arrow). (F) Ant (Crematogaster sp.) carrying a food body

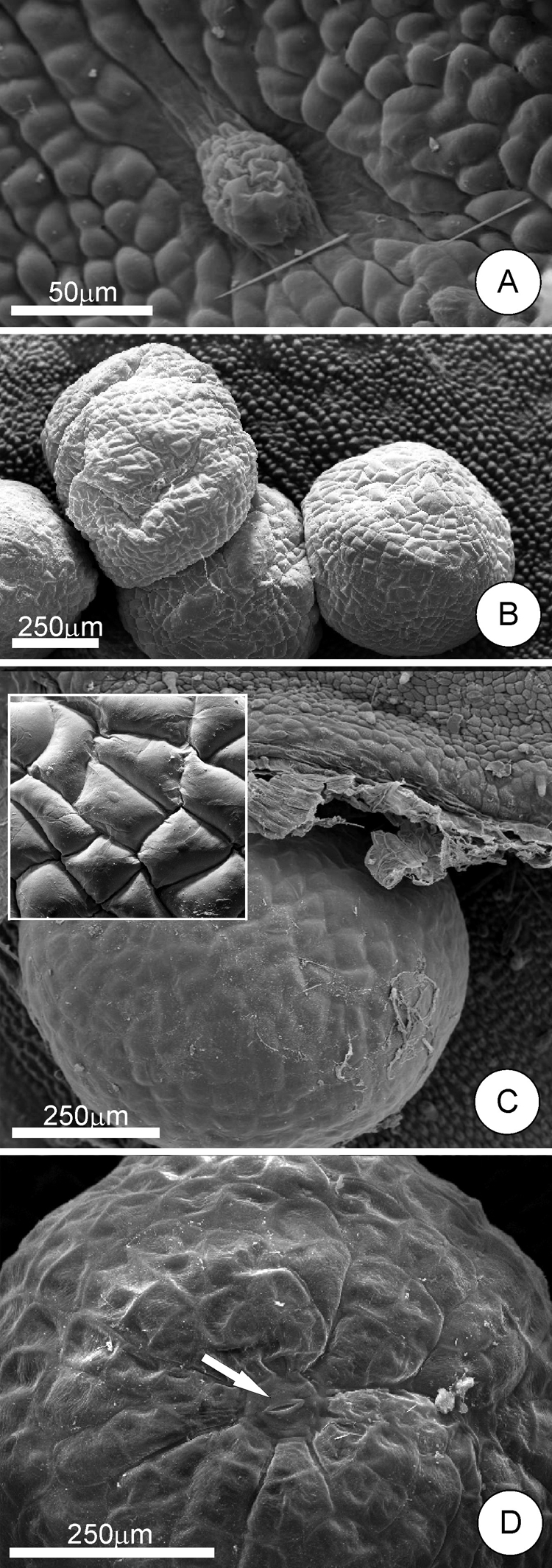
Scanning electron microscopy images of Cissus verticillata food bodies. (A) Locality where food bodies are formed on the stem; note the depression in which the FBs are formed in the midst of the papilose epidermal cells. (B) Food bodies in the nodal region of the stem. (C) Food body in the nodal region, partially protected by the stipule. Inset: detail of the epidermal cells of a food body; note the absence of any pores or ruptured areas of the cuticle. (D) Food body on a leaf, detail of the distal portion, demonstrating a stoma (arrow)

Pearl bodies are small (0.5 - 3.0mm), lustrous, pearl-like food bodies produced from the epidermis of leaves, petioles and shoots of certain plants. They are rich in lipids, proteins and carbohydrates, and are sought after by various arthropods, that carry out vigorous protection of the plant against herbivores, thus functioning as a biotic defence. They are globose or club-shaped on short peduncles, easily detached from the plant, and are food sources in the same sense as Beltian bodies, Müllerian bodies, Beccarian bodies, coccid secretions and nectaries. They occur in at least 19 plant families (1982) with tropical and subtropical distribution.

Cells or tissues that offer food rewards to arthropods are commonplace in the plant world and are an important way of establishing symbiotic relationships. Ants collect these energy-rich bodies (27.8 kJ/g dry weight) and carry them into their nests. Removal of these bodies appears to stimulate the formation of new ones in the same place. The simultaneous presence of pearl bodies, ant domatia and extrafloral nectaries, suggest a facultative plant-ant mutualism. Early researchers dubbed these bodies 'perldrüsen' (Meyen 1837), 'pärlharen' (Nils Holmgren 1911) and 'perlules' (Kazimierz Stefan Rouppert 1926). Pearl bodies appear to be the primary, and possibly the only nutrient for ants inhabiting Central American myrmecophytes.

== Relationships with arthropods ==
Phytophagous mites such as Tetranychus kanzawai have been observed feeding on pearl bodies produced by Cayratia japonica of the family Vitaceae, a family in which pearl bodies are common. It also appears possible that the predatory mite Euseius sojaensis uses the pearl bodies as an alternative food source.

Pearl bodies are important in the association between the ant species Pheidole bicornis and various Piper species that have spaces between the leaf petiole and stem suitable for use as ant domatia. Some Piper species have stems hollowed out by the ants, while others have naturally hollow stems. These tunnels are 3 – 4 mm in diameter, and, when the ants are in residence, numerous pearl bodies grow from the adaxial surfaces of the petioles, and from the tunnel walls. A study by Deborah K Letourneau in 1983 found that the ants were so sated by the plant's pearl bodies that more than half the insect eggs they encountered while patrolling were dropped to the ground. In Mallotus japonicus extrafloral nectaries and pearl bodies function as a biotic defence, while a second line of defence is made up trichomes and pellucid dots containing toxic secondary metabolites.

== See also ==
- Food bodies
- Elaiosome
- Gongylidia

== Gallery ==
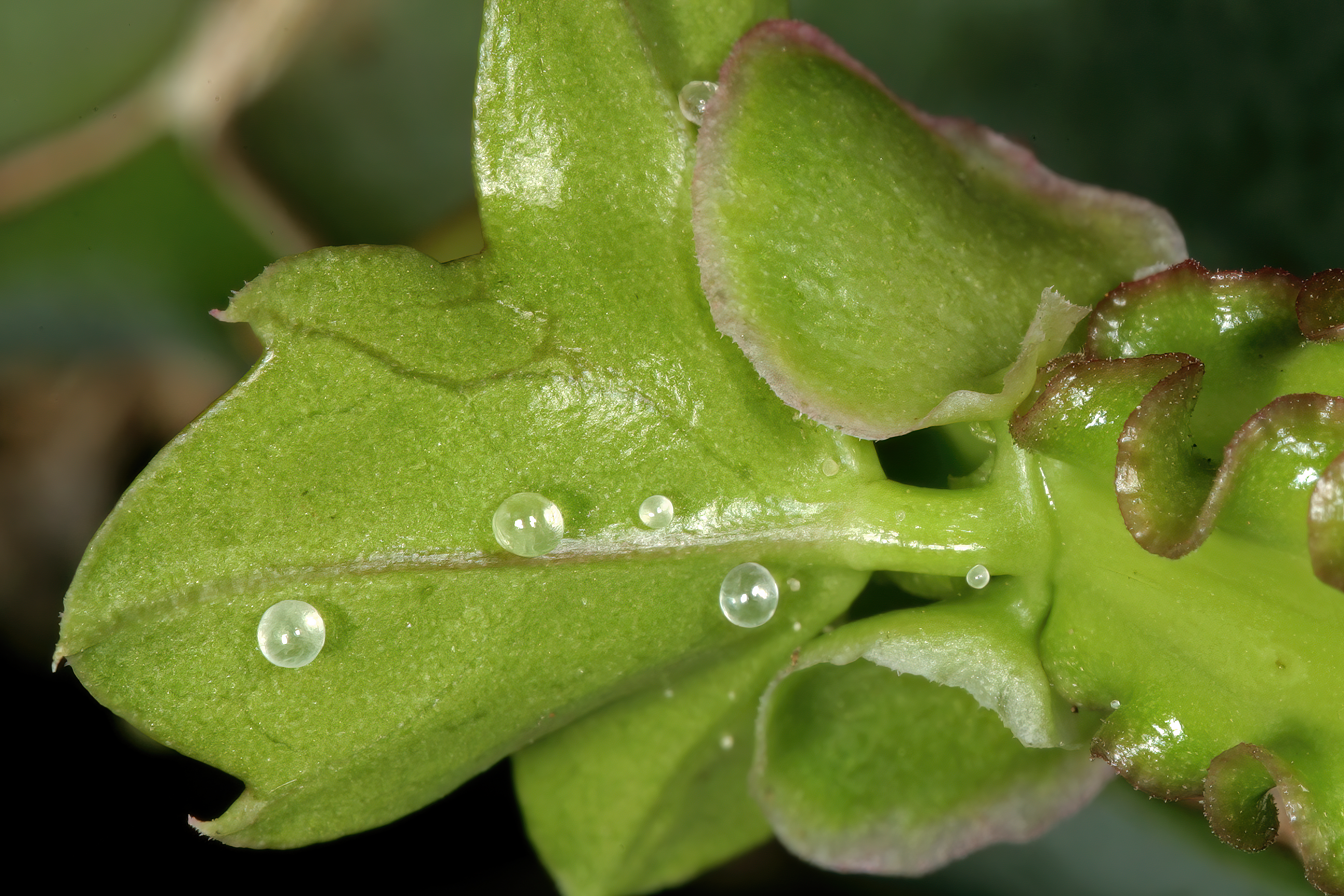
Cissus quadrangularis, young growth showing several pearl bodies.

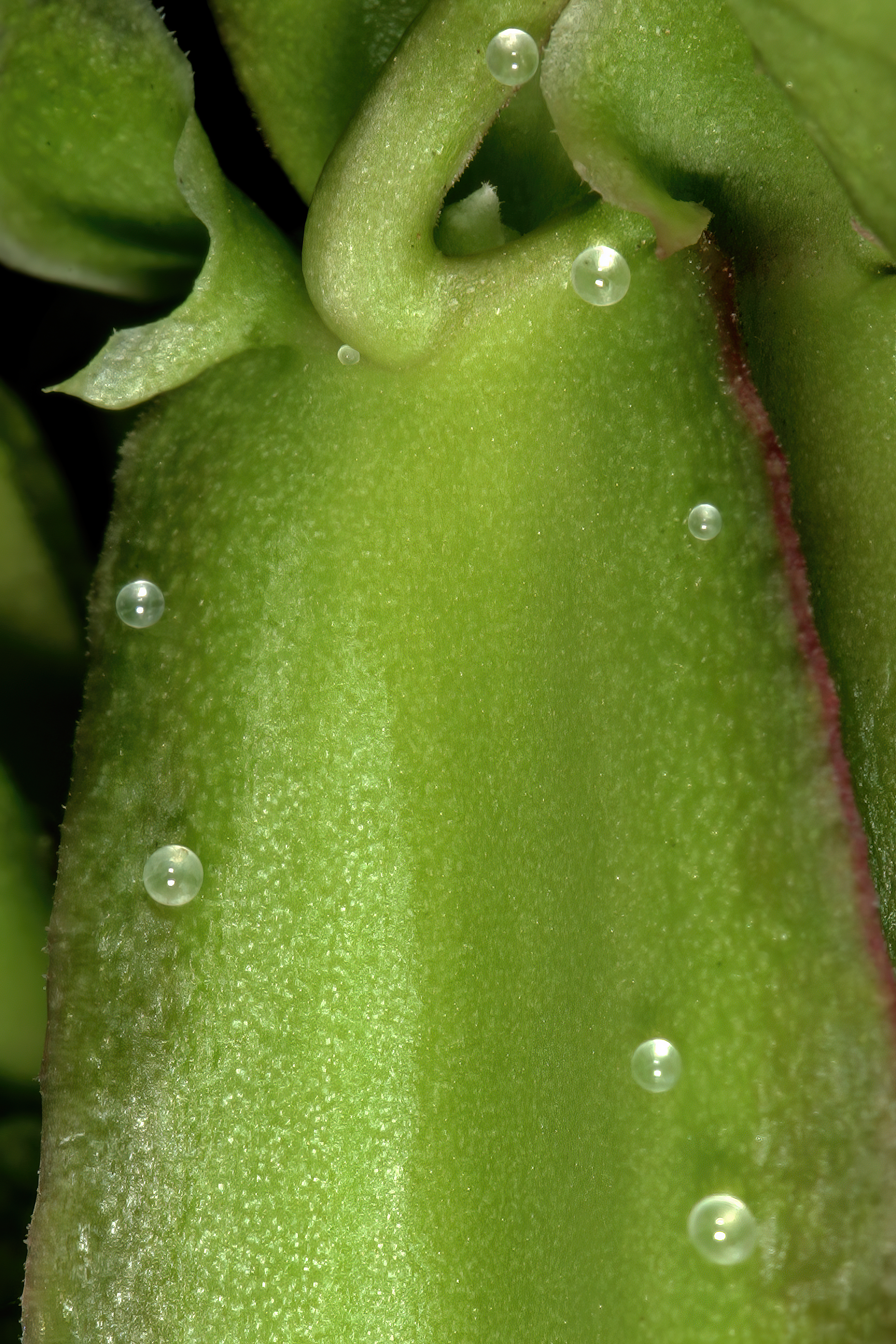
Cissus quadrangularis, young stem with several pearl bodies.

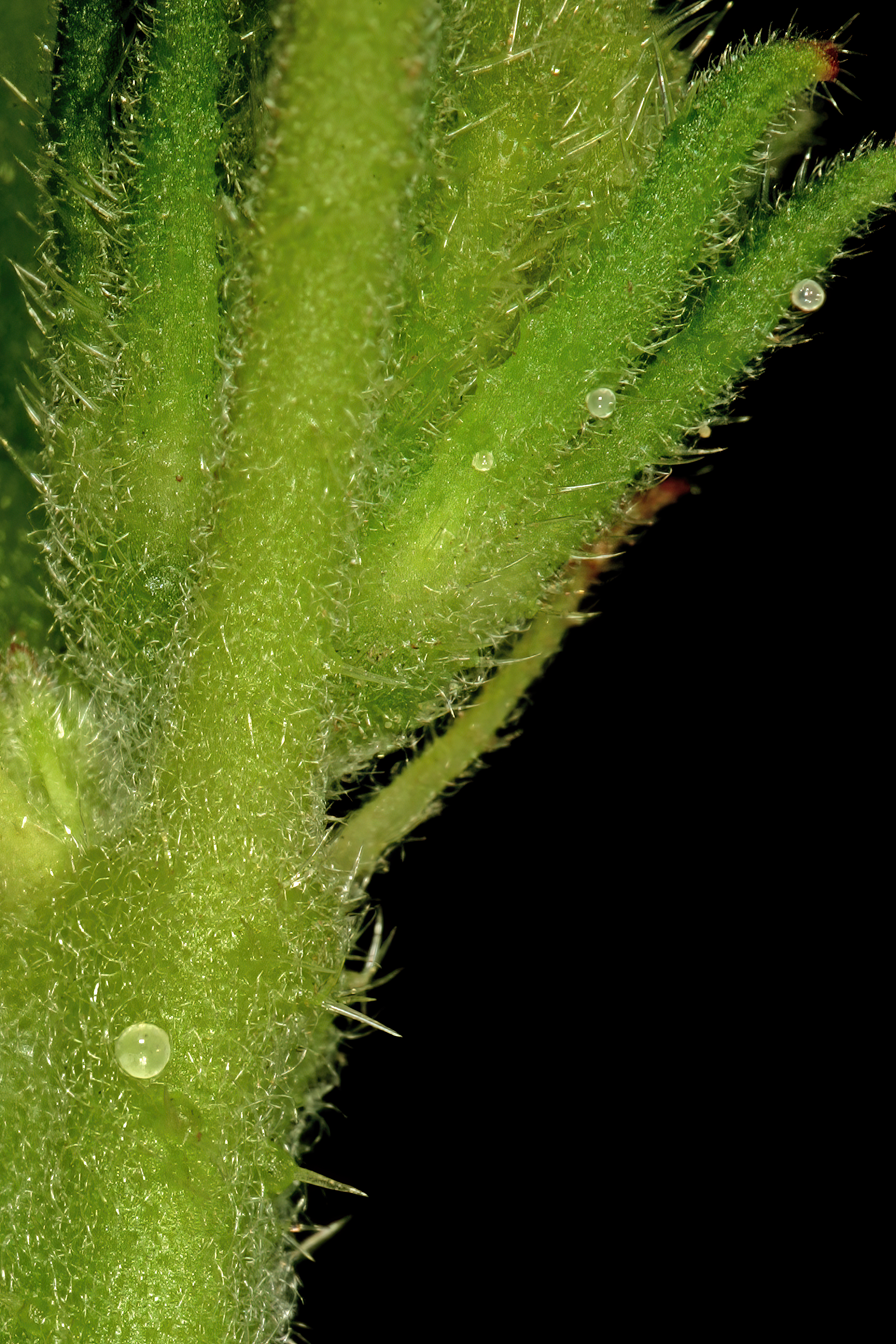
Hibiscus nigricaulis, node with base of flower, showing pearl bodies on stem and epicalyx.

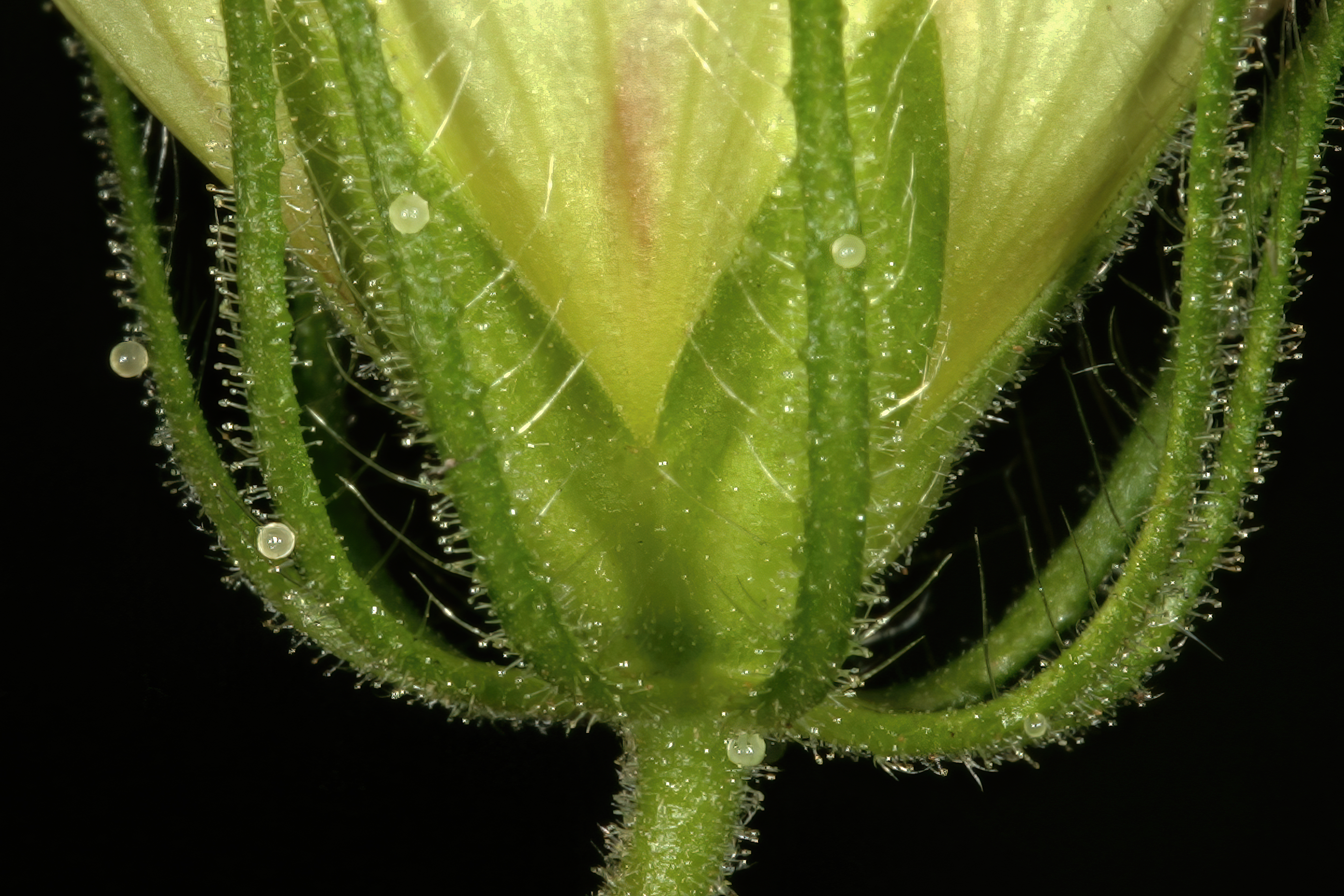
Pavonia transvaalensis, several pearl bodies mainly on epicalyx.
