= Toco toucan =

- A toco toucan in Mato Grosso, Brazil Call of the toco toucan

Conservation status
- Least Concern (IUCN 3.1)
- CITES Appendix II

Scientific classification
- Kingdom: Animalia
- Phylum: Chordata
- Class: Aves
- Order: Piciformes
- Family: Ramphastidae
- Genus: Ramphastos
- Species: R. toco

Binomial name
- Ramphastos toco Statius Müller, 1776
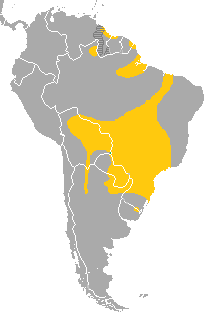
- Range in South America

Species of bird

The toco toucan (Ramphastos toco) is a species of bird in the family Ramphastidae. It is noted for its distinctive appearance, having a black body, white chest and throat, white uppertail coverts, and red undertail coverts. Its most conspicuous feature however is its huge beak, which is yellow-orange with a black base and a large, dark spot on the tip. It is the largest toucan species by size and is endemic to South America, where it has a wide distribution from the Guianas to northern Argentina, and its range has recently been expanding further southwards. Unlike other toucans which inhabit closed-canopy forests, toco toucans primarily inhabit a variety of semi-open habitats at altitudes of up to 1,750 m (5,740 ft). They are especially common in gallery forests, the Pantanal, and the cerrado of Brazil. They are the only species of toucan known to thrive in these environments.

Toco toucans mainly feed on fleshy fruits, but also supplement their diets with insects, eggs, and the nestlings of other birds. They will eat any available sugar-rich fruits, and show a high level of variation in their diet depending on the surrounding habitat. Breeding is seasonal, with the timing of the breeding season differing between regions. Nests are usually made in tree hollows and contain two to four eggs; both parents incubate the eggs for 17–18 days before hatching. It is considered to be of Least Concern by BirdLife International.

== Taxonomy ==
The oldest known remains of the toco toucan date back to around 20,000 years ago, from Pleistocene deposits in Lagoa Santa, Minas Gerais. The first European account of the species was written by the French naturalist Pierre Belon in his 1555 work Histoire de la nature des oyseaux. Belon possessed only a specimen of the bird's bill, and hypothesized that the toucan was a web-footed, fish-eating bird due to its long, serrated bill, which Belon thought shared some features with the bills of pelicans, mergansers, and some ducks. Belon's description and ideas remained influential until the eighteenth century.

The species was formally described as Ramphastos toco by the German zoologist Philipp Ludwig Statius Müller in 1776 on the basis of specimens from Cayenne, French Guiana. In 1862, the German ornithologist Jean Cabanis described R. albogularis as a new species based on specimens from southern Brazil; by 1870, it had been demoted to the status of a subspecies of R. toco. The name of the genus, Ramphastos, derives from a misspelling of the Ancient Greek ῥαμφηστης, rhamphēstēs, meaning snouted, which is itself derived from the Greek ῥαμφη, rhampē, meaning bill; the name refers to the large bill of the toucans. The specific name toco comes from either Tucá or Tucán, the Guarani word for toucan, and may mean "bone-nose". Toco toucan is the official common name designated by the International Ornithologists' Union (IOU). It is called the tucanuçu in Portuguese, tucán grande or tucán toco in Spanish, and tucano-boi locally in Rio Grande do Sul, Brazil. In Tsimané, an indigenous language spoken in the Bolivian Amazon, it is known as yubibi.

The toco toucan is one of eight species currently placed in the genus Ramphastos, and one of over forty species in the toucan family Ramphastidae. In 1974, the German ornithologist Jürgen Haffer hypothesized that the Ramphastos toucans could be split into two clades (groups of organisms descending from a common ancestor): the "smooth-billed yelpers", comprising the chestnut-mandibled and yellow-throated toucans, and the "channel-keel-billed croakers", comprising the toco, red-breasted, keel-billed, Choco, and channel-billed toucans. He further postulated that the toco toucan was basal (closest to the root of the phylogenetic tree) within the group of channel-keel-billed croakers. Later studies of mitochondrial DNA have largely confirmed the existence of these two clades, but have found the toco toucan to be basal within the family instead of being a part of the channel-keel-billed croakers. The following cladogram shows phylogenetic relationships within Ramphastos, based on a 2009 study by José Patané and colleagues: (Note: The study treated the citron-throated toucan (R. citreolaemus) as a subspecies of the channel-billed toucan (R. vitellinus).)

- Ramphastos
  - Toco toucan (Ramphastos toco)
  - - - White-throated toucan (Ramphastos tucanus)
      - Yellow-throated toucan (Ramphastos ambiguus)
    - - Keel-billed toucan (Ramphastos sulfuratus)
      - - Red-breasted toucan (Ramphastos dicolorus)
        - - Choco toucan (Ramphastos brevis)
          - Channel-billed toucan (Ramphastos vitellinus)

=== Subspecies ===
Two subspecies are recognized by the IOU:

- R. t. toco Statius Müller, 1776: found in the Guianas, north and northeastern Brazil, and south-eastern Peru.
- R. t. albogularis Cabanis, 1862: (Note: albogularis means "white-throated" and is derived from the Latin albus, meaning "white", and the Modern Latin gularis, meaning "-throated".) Found in Paraguay, southern and eastern Brazil, northern Bolivia, and northern Argentina. Very similar to the nominate subspecies, but is said to be slightly smaller, with a shorter bill and whiter throat; however, measurements of individuals from both subspecies have found that differences in size are not consistent.

== Description ==
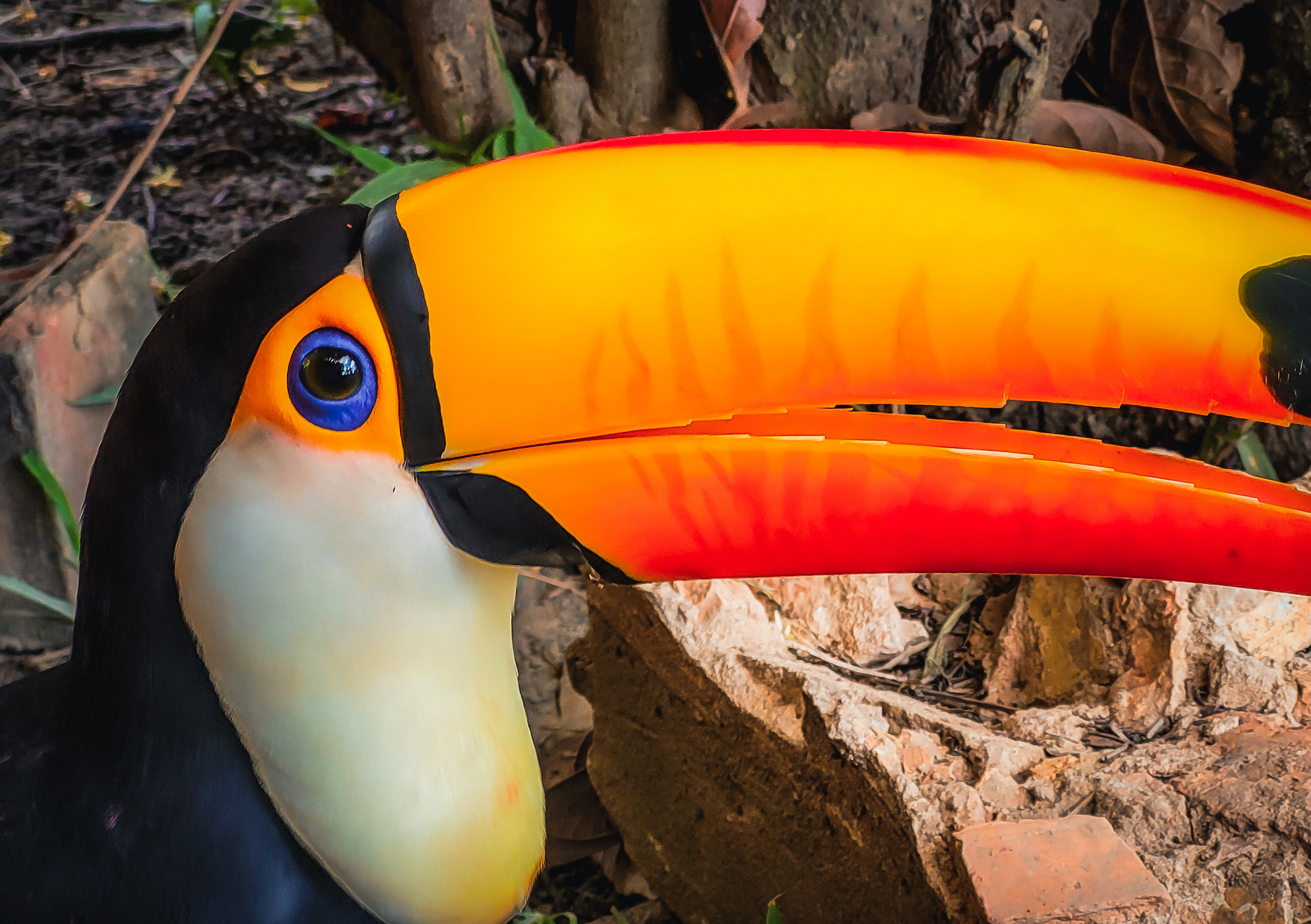
Lateral view of the beak

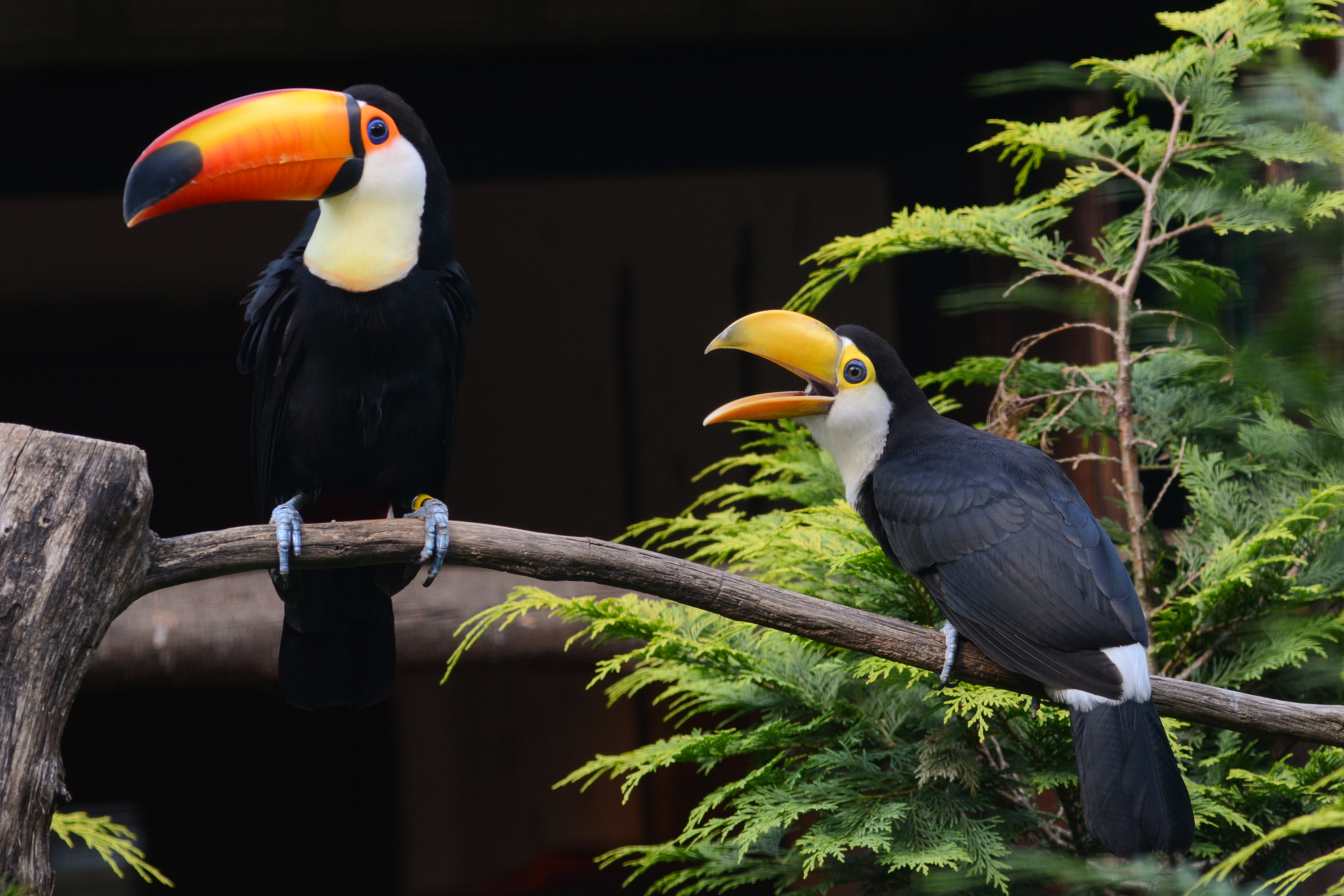
Adult (left) and juvenile

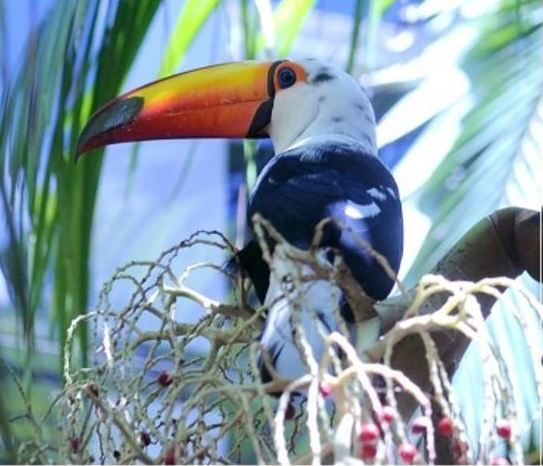
A partially leucistic toucan

Toco toucans are the largest identified species of toucan, with an average length of 56 cm (22 in). They cannot be mistaken for any other bird and are easily recognized by their large orange beaks. The body is mainly glossy black, with a white upper breast and throat. This white patch will sometimes have a citrine yellow tint and a red band where it meets the lower black breast, but these features are highly variable between individuals. The rump is white, while the underside of the tail, including the crissum, is red. The eye is brown (although it has also been reported as being varying shades of yellow, green, and blue), and is surrounded by a narrow blue ring, with the rest of the orbital skin being sulfur yellow to orange. A small patch of feathers near the lores is white and the orbital skin below the eye is sometimes greenish-yellow.

The extremely long and thin bill is usually reddest along the top of the culmen and has irregular orangish-brown bands on its sides, across the tomia. The beak varies in length from 173 to 215 mm (6.8 to 8.5 in) in male toucans and 158 to 202 mm (6.2 to 8.0 in) in females; on average, it is 200.5 mm (7.89 in) long in males and 178.6 mm (7.03 in) long in females. The base of the beak is black, forming a band thickest at the bottom of the mandible. The tip of the maxilla has a large black oval, which shines intensely when seen in light.

The beak looks heavy, but as in other toucans, it is relatively light because the inside is largely hollow. The tongue is nearly as long as the bill and very flat. Other than the size difference, there are no external differences between the sexes. Juveniles are duller and shorter-billed than adults. Among standard measurements, the wing chord is 22 to 26 cm (8.7 to 10.2 in), the tail is 14.1 to 17.9 cm (5.6 to 7.0 in) and the tarsus is 4.8 to 6.5 cm (1.9 to 2.6 in). Toco toucans are known to exhibit partial leucism.

=== Vocalizations ===
The species' voice consists of a variety of grunting, croaking, or snoring notes similar to those given by toads, including "groomkk", "grunt", "grunnkkt", "kkreekk", "grenggkt", "grr", "ggrekkekk", "arkk-rk", "rrraa", and "rrro-rrro". These notes can be made singly or in a long series, with up to 50 notes given per minute. The toucan's song is a series of grunting notes. Other calls include a murmured "te-te-te" and "ehh-ehh" vocalizations made by immatures of the species. Sounds are also made non-vocally, by hitting the bill against a branch.

Although the toco toucan is unlikely to be confused visually with any other species, its vocalizations may be confused for those of the red-breasted and channel-billed toucans. The toco toucan's calls are deeper and less resonant than the calls of both of those species. Additionally, the fast parts of its calls are slower than the corresponding portions of the red-breasted toucan's calls.

== Distribution and habitat ==
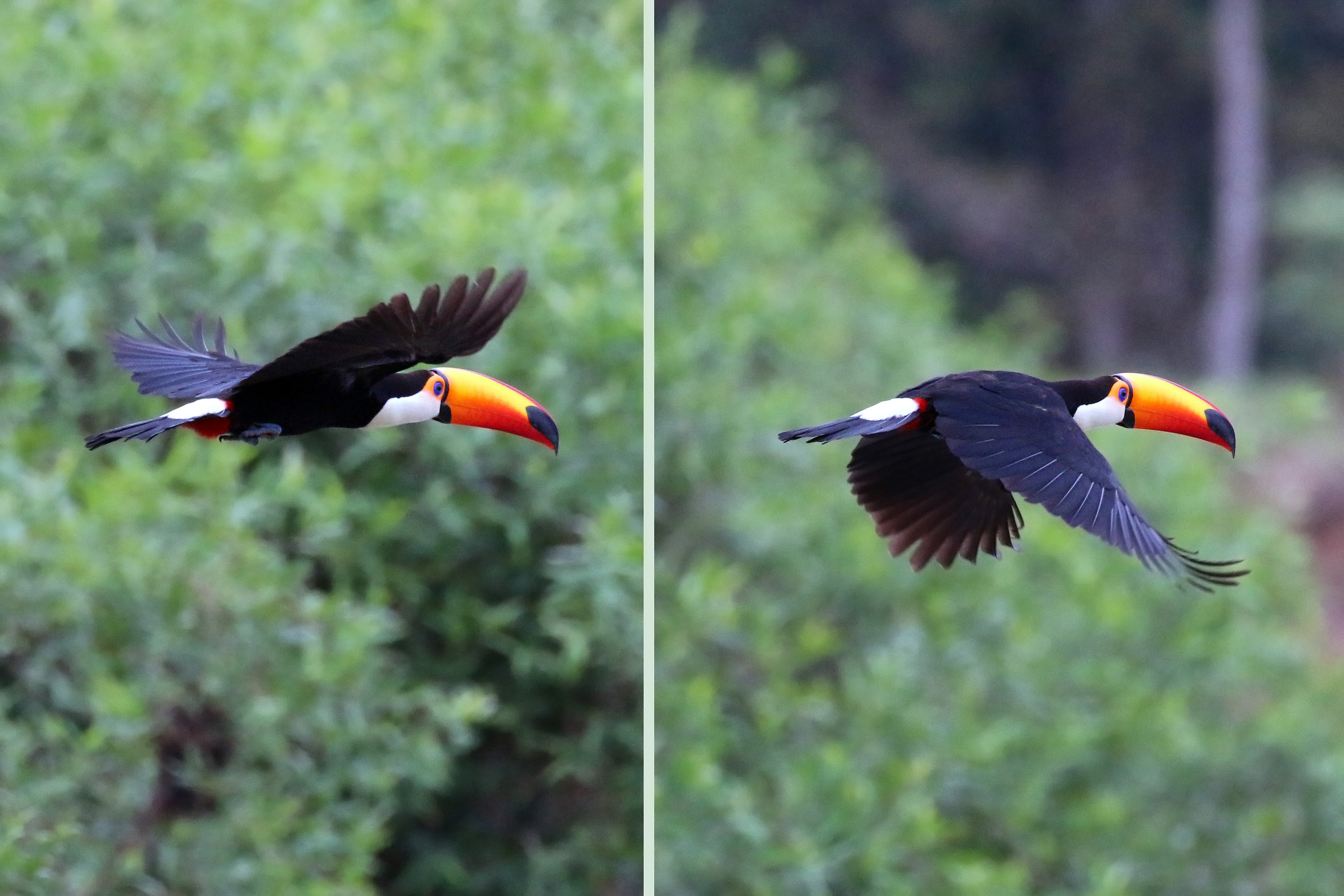
Toco toucan flying in the Brazilian Pantanal

The toco toucan is endemic to South America, where it has a wide distribution from the Guianas in the north to northern Argentina and Uruguay in the south. In the northern portion of its range, it has several disjunct populations, including in the Guianas, in northern Brazil near the Rio Branco, and along the mouth of the Amazon upstream to around Manaus in eastern Amazonas. It is also found from coastal Maranhão extending southwest to southwestern Brazil, Bolivia, and Pampas del Heath in far southeastern Peru, as well as south through Piauí and Bahia to northern Argentina and Uruguay. It was previously thought to have gone extinct in Tucumán in northwestern Argentina by the late 1990s, but was rediscovered there in the early 2010s. The species's range in the Amazon rainforest may be increasing due to deforestation. Similarly, it has only been recorded from Uruguay recently; previously, the southward limit of its range was Lagoa dos Patos in Brazil. The recent expansion its range south of the 30th parallel may be caused by escapes of captive individuals or changes in ecological conditions. Toco toucans are generally resident, but will sometimes move en masse in search of food.

Compared to other toucans, toco toucans are adapted to more dry and open habitats; hence they prefer gallery forests, savannas, woodlands, secondary forests, forests near bodies of water, the chaco, plantations, orchards, and groves over the dense Amazon. They are especially common in the Brazilian cerrado, a tropical savanna biome, and in the wetlands of the Pantanal. They are known to inhabit altitudes of up to 1,750 m (5,740 ft).

== Behavior and ecology ==
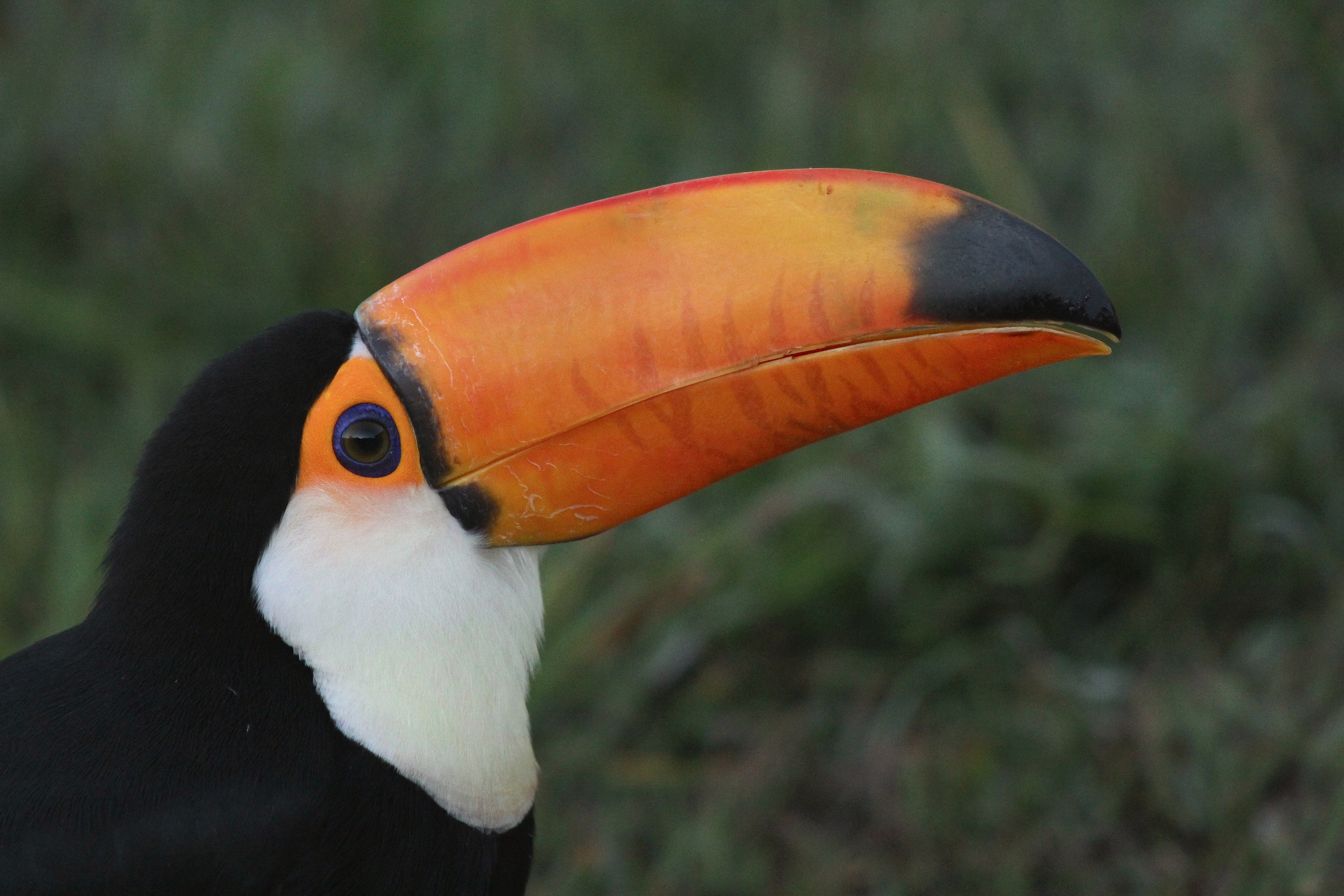
Close-up of beak

Toco toucans are typically seen when flying or feeding in treetops, hopping from branch to branch. Their flight is somewhat undulating because they switch between heavy flapping and gliding when flying. Toco toucans, like other toucans, have large home ranges, with an average size of 86 ha (210 acres). They are more widely dispersed than other toucans, who do not cross large bodies of water, and are able to sustain flight across water bodies over 5 km (3.1 mi) wide.

Toco toucans are less active during the day, occasionally resting in treetops. They are less gregarious than other toucans and usually feed alone or in small groups at fruiting trees. When foraging together, toucans fly from treetop to treetop in single file. Members of a group will often preen each other, although this behaviour usually ends after egg-laying occurs, as mates begin to exclusively preen each other. After the end of the breeding season, toco toucans will sometimes form large flocks that fly around forests searching for fruit. These flocks may sometimes include other species like the white-throated toucan.

=== Bill ===
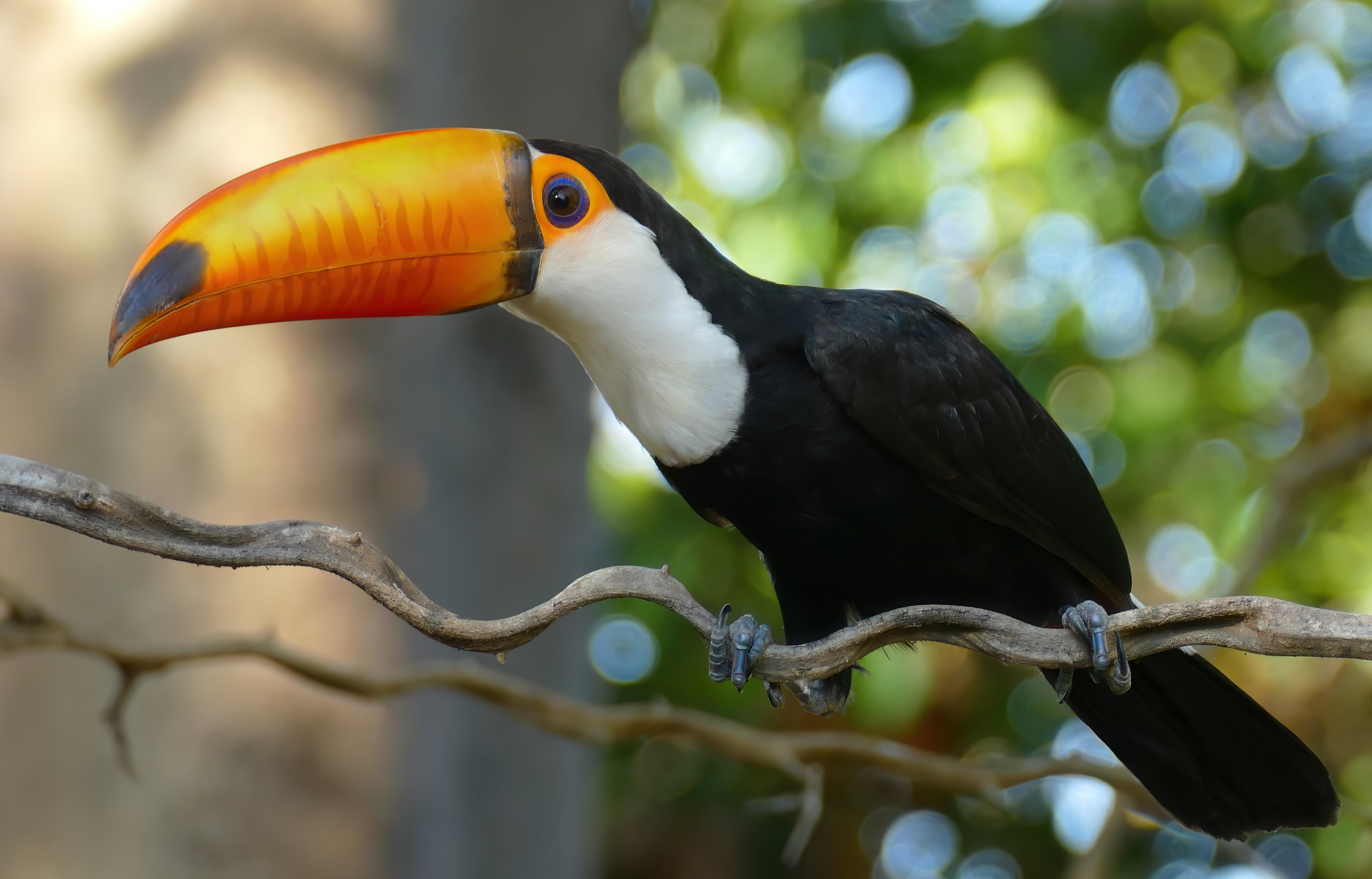
A toco toucan in Mato Grosso, Brazil

The toco toucan has the largest bill relative to body size of any bird, comprising 30-50% of its total surface area, although another Neotropical species, the sword-billed hummingbird, has a longer bill relative to its body length.

Research has shown that one function of the beak is to increase the surface area for heat exchange. The bill has the ability to modify blood flow and regulate heat distribution in the body, allowing it to be used as a thermal radiator. In terms of surface area used for this function, the bill relative to the bird's size is amongst the largest of any animal and has a network of superficial blood vessels supporting the thin horny sheath on the bill made of keratin called the rhamphotheca.

In its capacity to remove body heat, the bill is comparable to that of elephant ears. The ability to radiate heat depends upon air speed: if this is low, only 25% of the adult bird's resting heat production is radiated; if high, it radiates as much as four times this heat production. In comparison, the bill of a duck and the ears of an elephant can shed only about 9% of resting heat production. The bill normally is responsible for 30–60% of heat loss. The practice of toco toucans of placing their bills under their wings may serve to insulate the bill and reduce heat loss during sleep. It has been observed that "complexities of the vasculature and controlling mechanisms needed to adjust the blood flow to the bill may not be completely developed until adulthood."

Further suggestions for its beak have included aid in peeling fruit, intimidation of other birds when attacking nests, social selection for defending territory, and to serve as a visual warning to predators.

Toco toucan beaks can suffer from a number of deformities, such as crossed mandibles, the absence of up to half of the upper or lower mandible, and perforations.

=== Diet ===
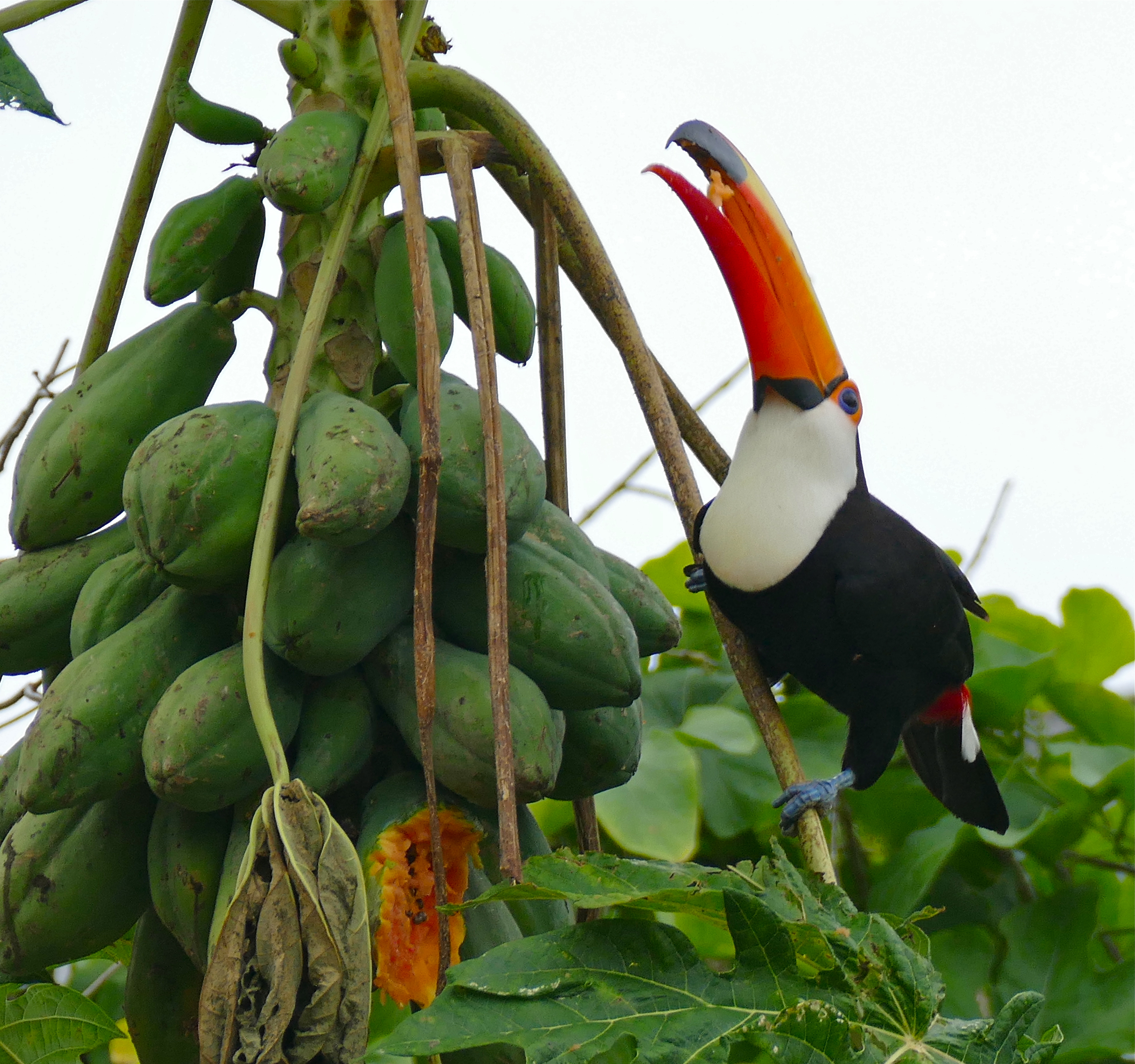
Toco toucan feeding on papaya

Toco toucans are generalist frugivores that primarily feed on fleshy fruits, but also commonly supplement their diets with insects, eggs, and nestlings of other birds. Foraging usually takes place in the canopy, but toucans will also visit the understory and ground to feed on fallen fruits. Toucans are known to feed on a variety of fleshy fruit, most notably figs, oranges, guavas, and peppers. Other plants that fruit year-round and feature significantly in the species's diet include Cecropia pachystachya and Inga laurina. Toucans will also opportunistically feed on any available sugar-rich fruits, and display a high level of variation in their diet depending on the surrounding habitat. In deciduous forests with a year-round supply of figs, toucans do not show significant change from season to season in their diet. In areas with significant variation in the availability of fleshy fruits, toucans are more common during the fruiting season, and subsequently move to other habitats when fruit availability declines.

Plants that have been recorded as contributing majorly to the toco toucan's diet include Genipa americana, Ficus luschnatiana, and Virola sebifera in gallery forest, Schefflera macrocarpa, Copaifera langsdorffii, Didymopanax morototoni, and Nectandra cissiflora in the cerrado, and Guibourtia hymenaefolia and D. morototoni in semi-deciduous forests. During the dry season, when the availability of fruits declines, toco toucans will also feed on flowers of species such as Handroanthus chrysotrichus and Erythrina fusca.

The insects most commonly consumed by toco toucans are caterpillars and termites. Toco toucans also feed on small vertebrates such as amphibians, lizards, eggs, nestlings, and small birds. In the wild, toucans prey on the nests of icterid blackbirds, tyrant flycatchers, puffbirds, and parrots, and especially target the nests of yellow-rumped caciques. The largest known birds whose nests are predated upon by the toco toucan are the hyacinth macaw and buff-necked ibis; the nestlings of the latter weigh 200–300 g (7.1–10.6 oz), compared to the toucan's body mass of around 540 g (19 oz), and are killed by breaking their necks with sideways movements of the toucan's beak. In captivity, toucans will feed on a number of smaller birds that are placed with them, such as Toxostoma thrashers, house sparrows, Inca doves, cactus wrens, and Gambel's quails.

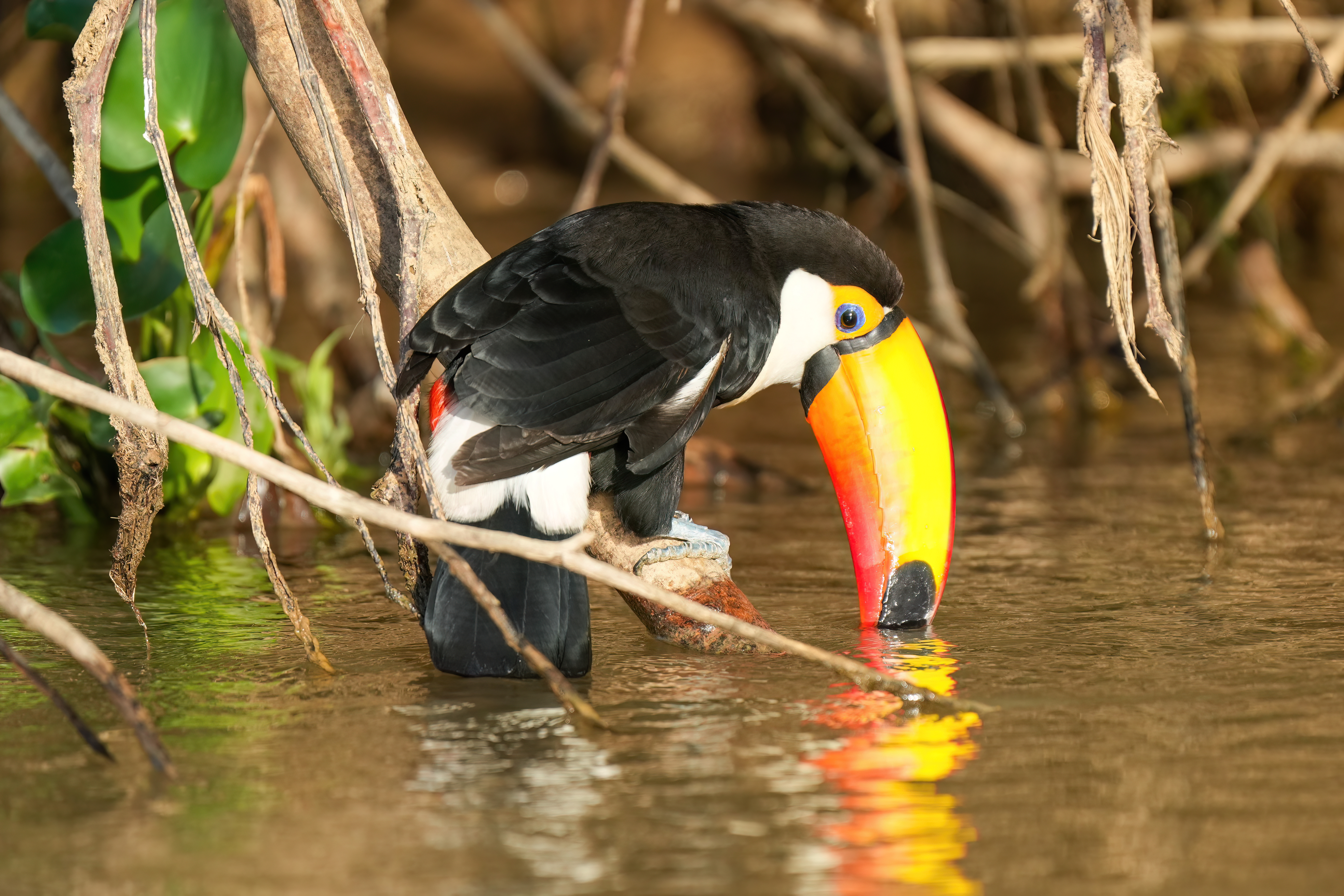
Drinking water from a river in the Pantanal

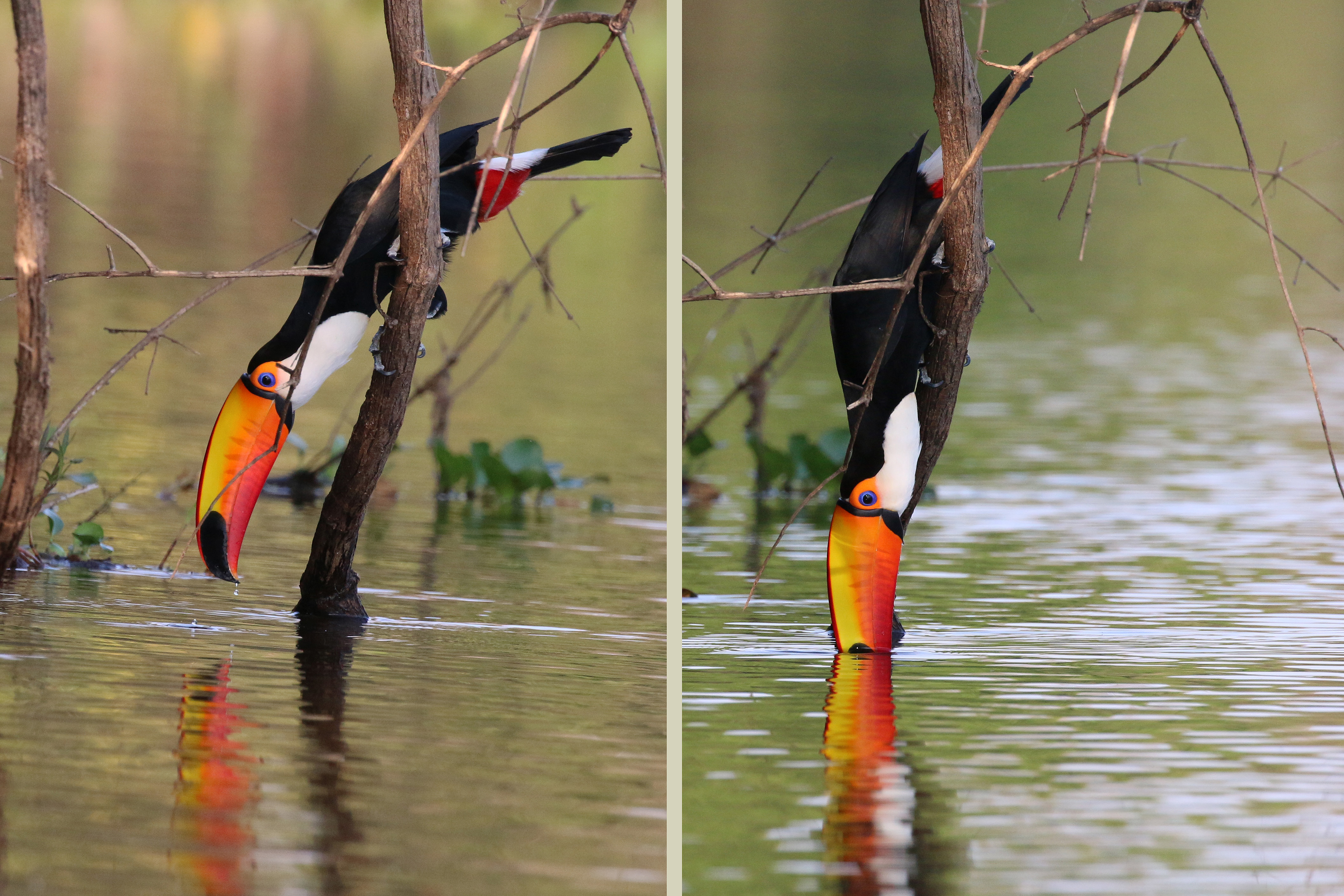
Drinking water from the Cuiaba River

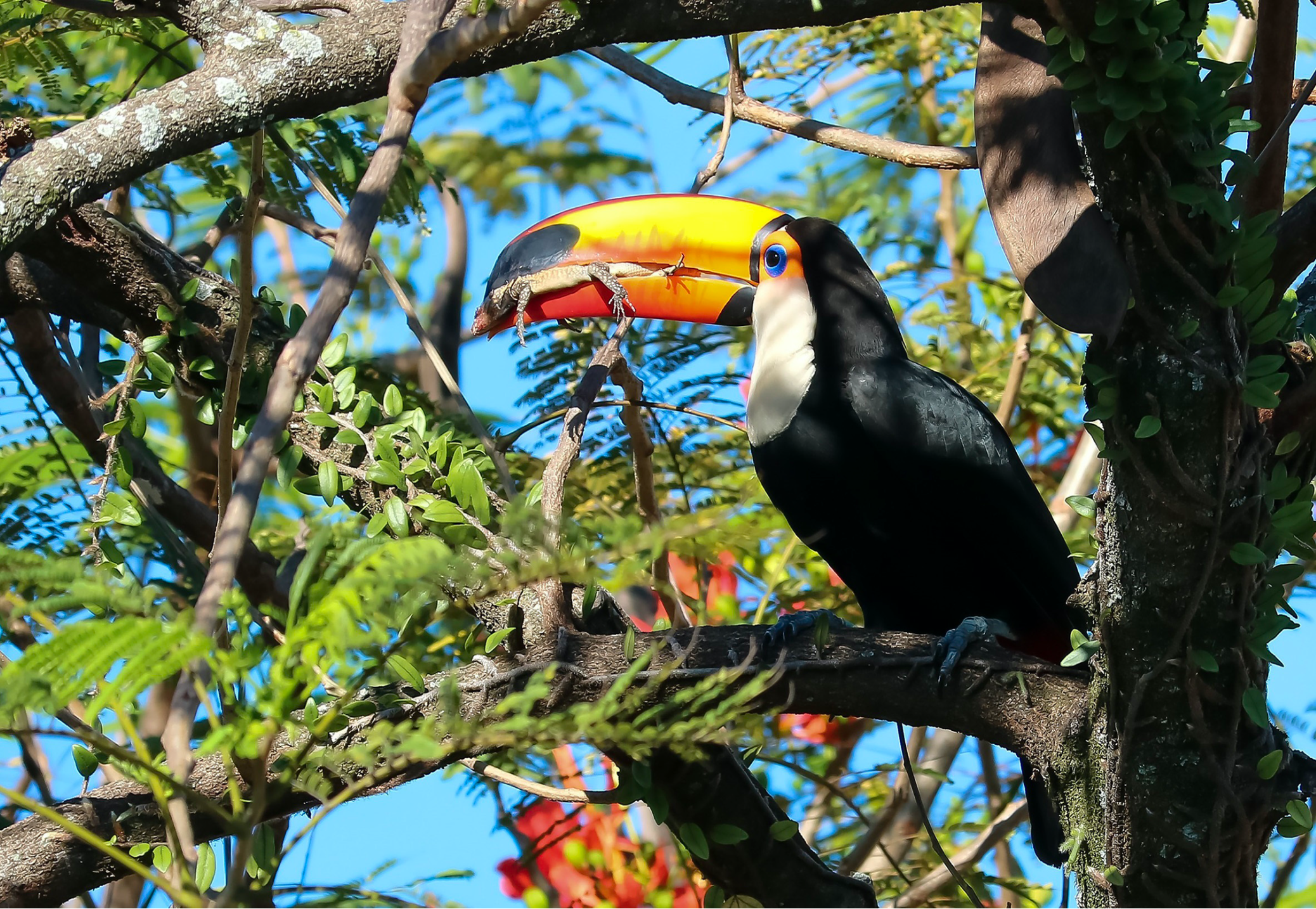
Eating Amazon lava lizard

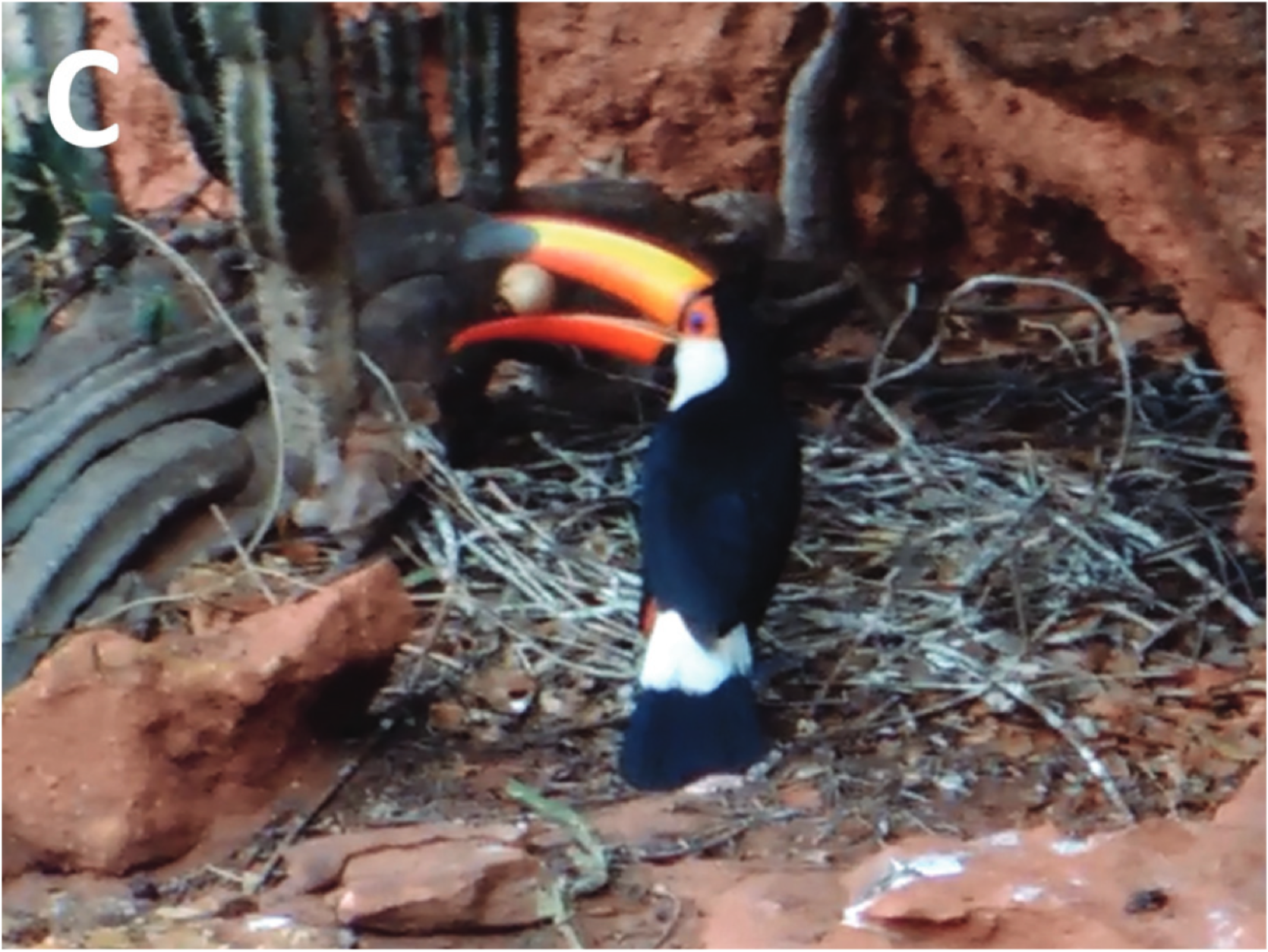
Feeding on buff-necked ibis eggs

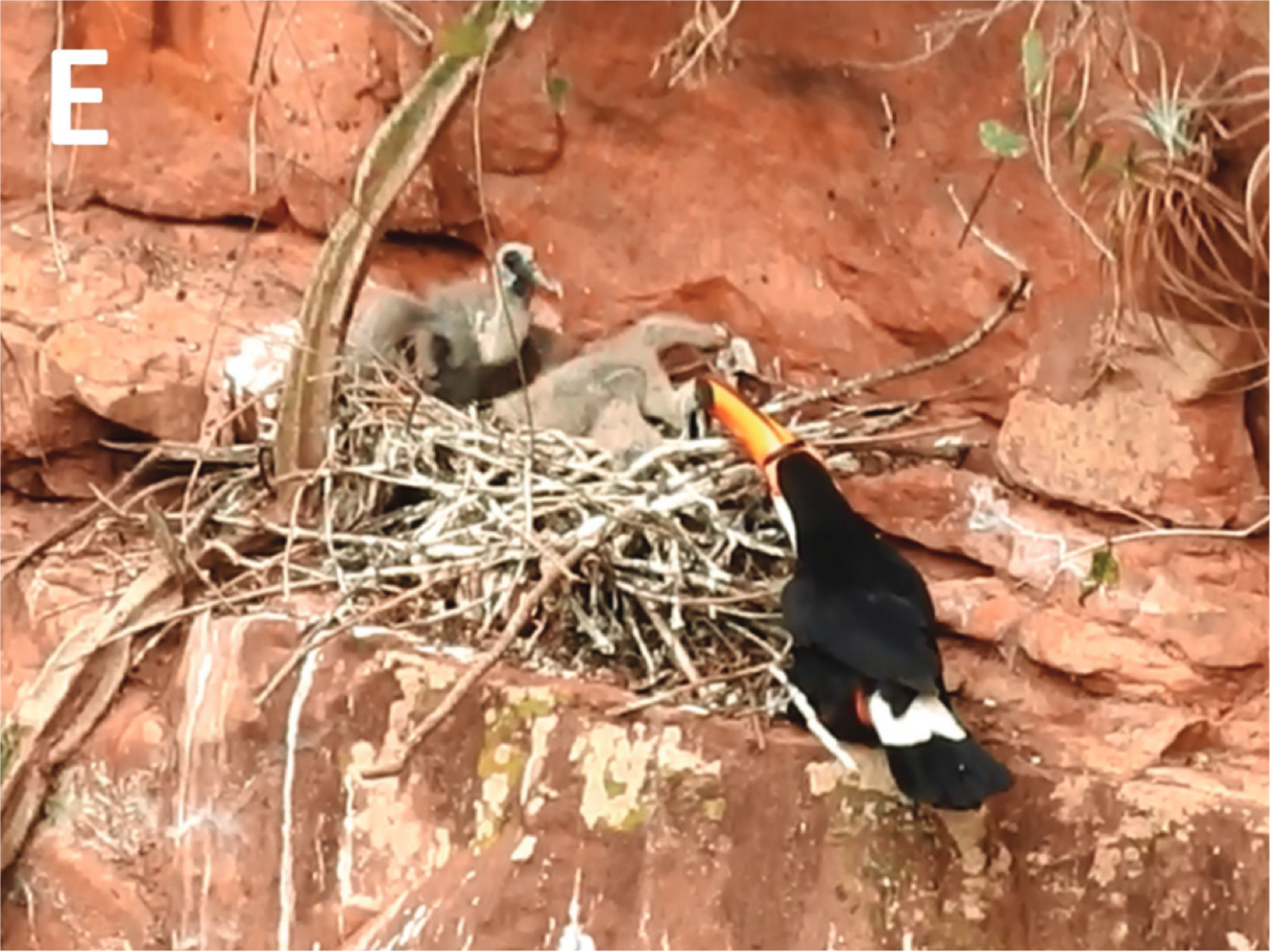
Attacking buff-necked ibis nestlings by attempting to break their neck

=== Breeding ===
Toco toucans show several changes in behavior during their nesting season, becoming more secretive and solitary in habit. Preening of toucans by birds outside of the mated pair stops soon after egg-laying; mates will continue to frequently preen each other or tap their beaks together. Males will sometimes display the red feathers on the underside of the tail while fanning out their undertail coverts; their large, conspicuous bill may also be used in breeding displays.

Nesting is seasonal, but the timing of the breeding season differs between regions. Breeding has been observed from September to January in Amazonas and Maranhão and from September to February in São Paulo, Rio de Janeiro, Paraná, and Paraguay. In eastern Argentina and Rio Grande do Sul, it occurs from October to February, and in Goiás, Minas Gerais, and Bahia, it lasts from November to February. It has been documented from December to June in Bolivia and western Argentina, and from May to June in Piauí. Nesting occurs in cavities, which are usually made in trees such as coral cockspur and slash pines, but which can also be in stream banks or termite mounds. Nests are sometimes made in cavities excavated by other species of birds: recorded instances include nests in cavities made by campo flickers and cream-backed woodpeckers. Successful breeding has also been observed in urban areas, although high levels of human-caused disturbances, such as construction activities, around the nest can lead to abandonment by the parents. Captive birds have been observed cleaning their nests early on, but the nests are eventually filled with droppings and fruit seeds.

Toucans usually breed annually in the wild, but have been reported breeding multiple times a year in captivity. Females lay two to four eggs, which are incubated by both parents for 17–18 days, after which they hatch. Chicks can be detected by the loud begging calls they make in the absence of their parents. Hatchlings are initially fed mostly insects, with the proportion of fruit in their diet increasing as they age. Chicks fledge 43–52 days after hatching.

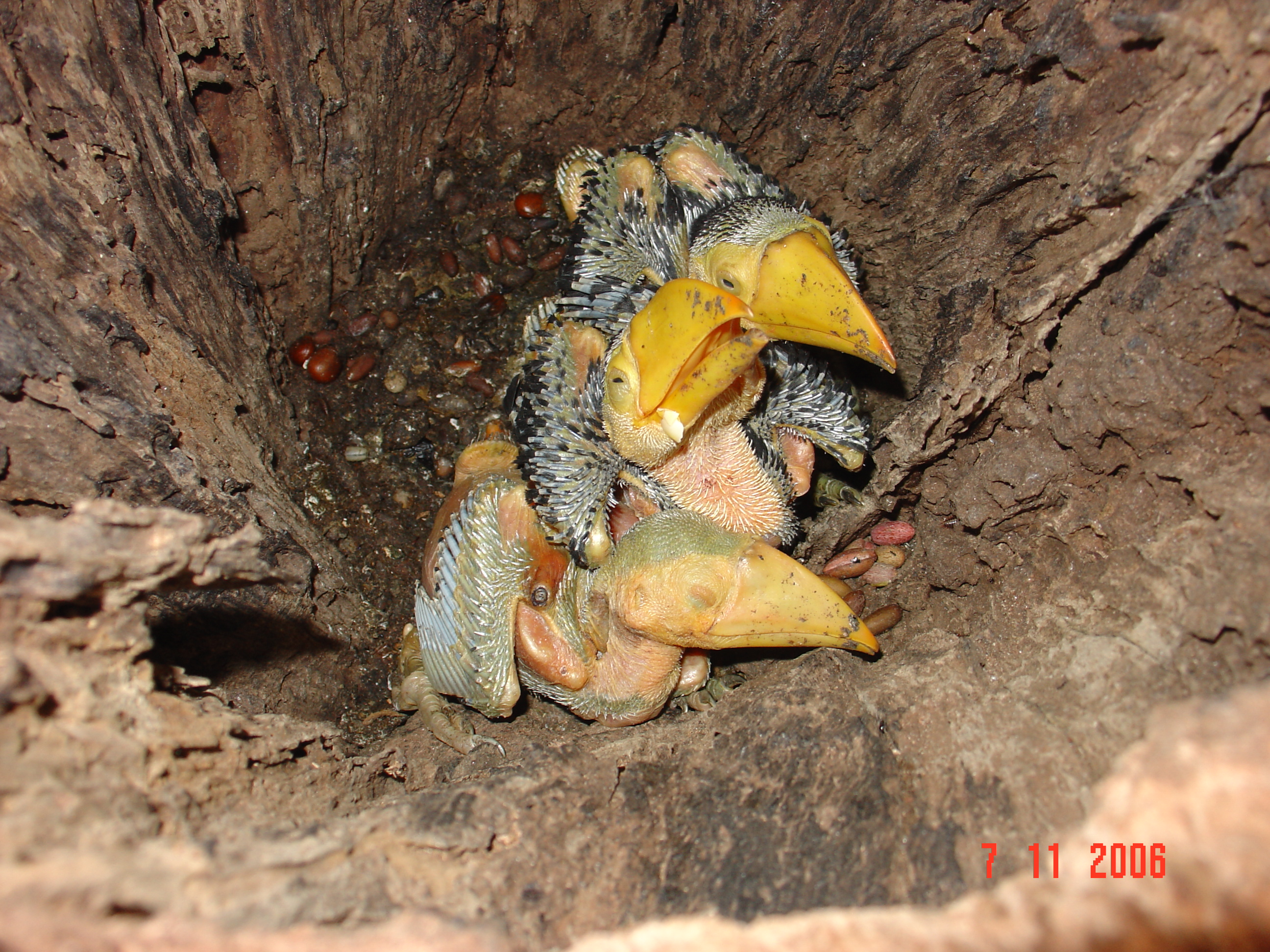
Hatchlings

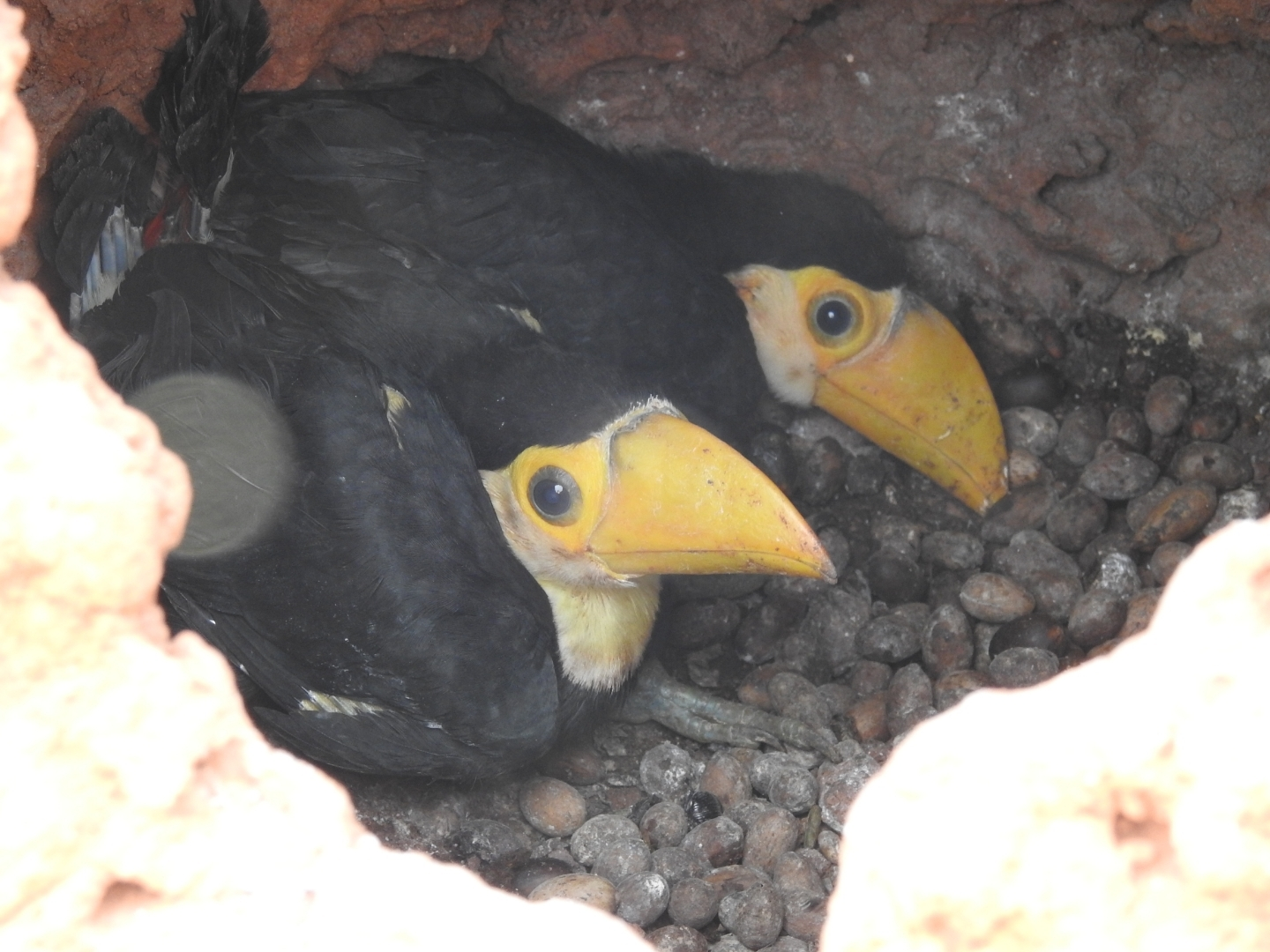
Young at nest; note the layer of fruit seeds at the bottom of the nest.

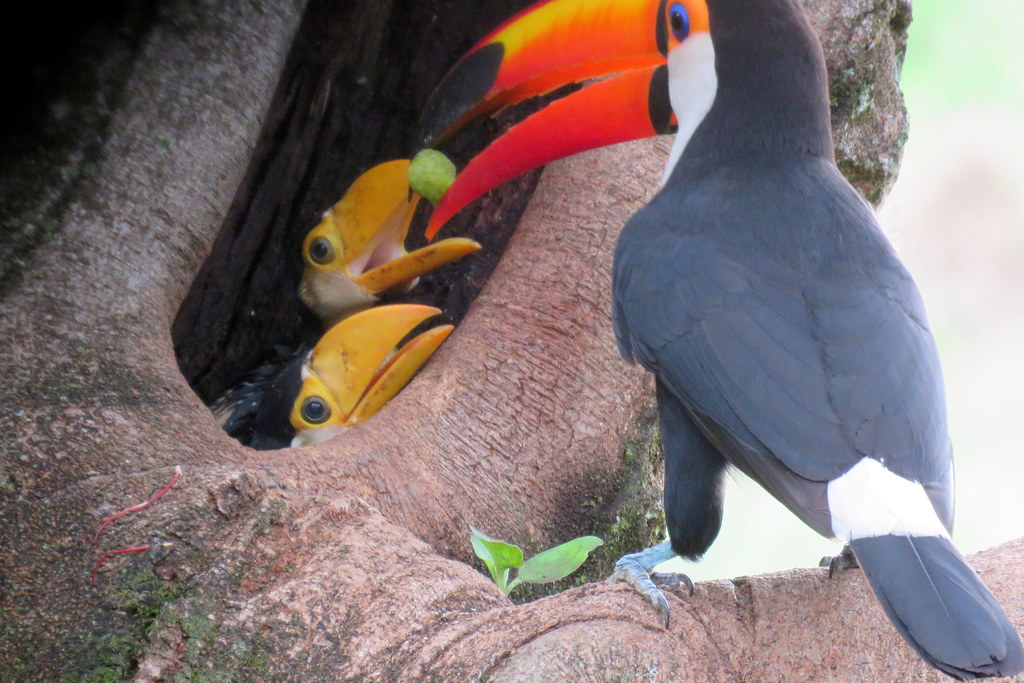
Adult toucan feeding young

=== Interactions with other species ===
Like other toucans, toco toucans are significant seed dispersers due to their large mouths, large home ranges, and adaptability to different types of habitats. They are amongst the few large frugivorous birds that remain in urban environments. Toco toucans defecate large numbers of undamaged seeds; such seeds are less likely to germinate than those regurgitated by smaller seed dispersers, but the toucan's larger size and feeding habits mean that it disperses seeds further from the parent plant. One study estimated that medium-sized seeds are deposited 269–449 m (883–1,473 ft) away from the plants where they originated. Although toco toucans mainly feed on native species, some invasive plants, like Royostenia oleracea and Elaeis guineensis, do represent significant portions of their diet. Toco toucans may help spread such invasive species to forest fragments and rural areas near cities, helping them become established and accelerating the process of invasion.

Toco toucans are also an especially important seed disperser for the manduvi tree, being responsible for over 83% of the seed dispersal of that species. The endangered hyacinth macaw nests near-exclusively in hollows in manduvi trees, leading to an indirect dependency on the toco toucan, despite the latter species being responsible for over half of egg predation of the hyacinth macaw. Toco toucans may also be ecologically significant nest predators for species which nest in areas with few other terrestrial predators, such as cliffs.

No specific predators of the toco toucan are known, but toucans in general are known to be hunted by monkeys and large birds of prey such as hawks and eagles. Several species of chewing lice, such as Austrophilopterus cancellosus and Myrsidea witti, are known to parasitize the toco toucan. The species is also parasitized by the protozoans Plasmodium nucleophilum, P. huffi, P. pinottii, Toxoplasma gondii, and Giardia duodenalis, Trichomonas parabasalids, and trematodes.

== Relationship with humans ==
=== Conservation ===
Because it prefers open habitats, the toco toucan is likely to benefit from the widespread deforestation in tropical South America; it is known to inhabit areas around airports and newly-made roads. It has a large range and except in the outer regions of its range, it is typically fairly common. It is therefore considered to be of Least Concern by BirdLife International. Toco toucans are hunted for their meat and for the pet trade; the large flocks it forms after the breeding season were previously known to be hunted heavily for meat, with their bills being kept as a souvenir. The impact of hunting on the population is unknown. A 2023 study of the wildlife trade in toucans found that toco toucans were the second most commonly traded species from 1975 to 2018. They were exported from a greater range of Latin American countries than other toucans and were the most expensive, with an average retail price of US$12,450 in 2020 (equivalent to $15,490 in 2025) and some specimens fetching up to $13,400 (equivalent to $16,700 in 2025).

=== Culture ===
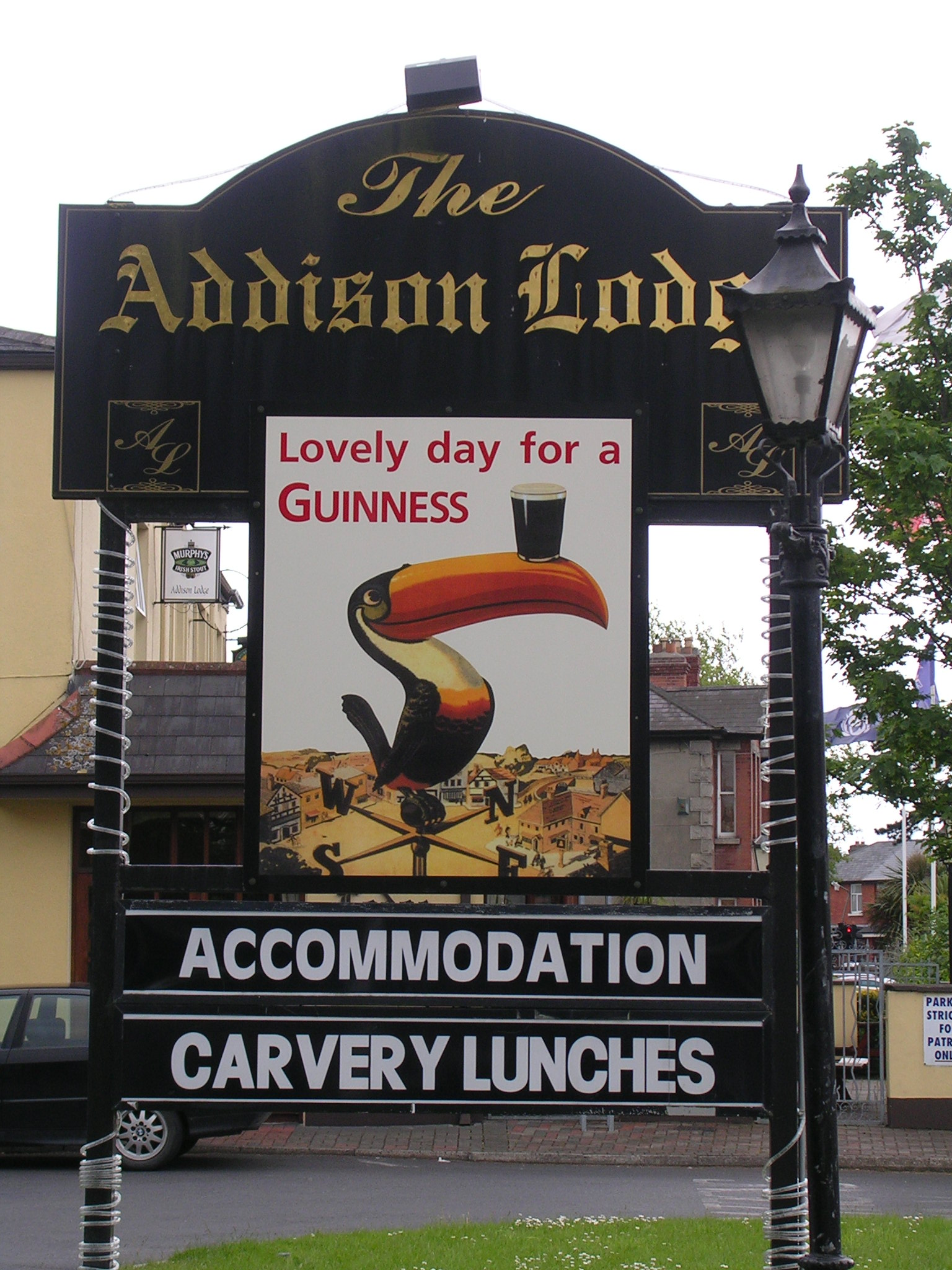
Ad featuring the Guinness toucan in Dublin, Ireland

Toco toucans are one of the best-known Neotropical birds, likely due to their colorful appearance and beak. They are recognized both internationally and domestically within their range. They have gained popularity through the spread of the Internet, also both internationally and within Brazil. The toucan is an object of ridicule in Brazilian legend. According to one story, the birds accepted him as their king after seeing the size of his bill while he was hidden inside a hole; after he came out, the birds mocked him for being "nothing but nose". In the mythology of the Ayoreo people of the Gran Chaco of Bolivia and Paraguay, the word for toco toucan, Carai, is also the name of a honey hunter. The toco toucan was part of one of the most famous ad campaigns for Guinness, an Irish brand of stout. The toucan is the symbol of the centre-right Brazilian Social Democracy Party.

== See also ==
- Wildlife of Brazil
- List of birds of Brazil
- List of birds of South America
