= Didymopanax =

Scientific classification
- Kingdom: Plantae
- Clade: Embryophytes
- Clade: Tracheophytes
- Clade: Angiosperms
- Clade: Eudicots
- Clade: Asterids
- Clade: Campanulids
- Order: Apiales
- Family: Araliaceae
- Genus: Didymopanax; Decne. & Planch.

Species
- See text

Genus of flowering plants

Didymopanax is a genus of flowering plants in the family Araliaceae, native to southern Mexico, Central America, the Caribbean, and South America. It was resurrected from Schefflera in 2020.

== Species ==
The following species are accepted:

- Didymopanax acuminatus Marchal
- Didymopanax angustissimus Marchal
- Didymopanax auratus (Fiaschi) Fiaschi & G.M.Plunkett
- Didymopanax botumirimensis (Fiaschi & Pirani) Fiaschi & G.M.Plunkett
- Didymopanax burchellii Seem.
- Didymopanax calvus (Cham.) Decne. & Planch.
- Didymopanax capixabus (Fiaschi) Fiaschi & G.M.Plunkett
- Didymopanax cephalanthus Harms
- Didymopanax ciliatifolius (Fiaschi & Frodin) Fiaschi & G.M.Plunkett
- Didymopanax confusus (Marchal) Fiaschi & G.M.Plunkett
- Didymopanax cordatus Taub.
- Didymopanax decaphyllus (Seem.) Fiaschi & G.M.Plunkett
- Didymopanax dichotomus (Fiaschi & Frodin) Fiaschi & G.M.Plunkett
- Didymopanax distractiflorus Harms
- Didymopanax fruticosus (Fiaschi & Pirani) Fiaschi & G.M.Plunkett
- Didymopanax gardneri Seem.
- Didymopanax glaziovii Taub.
- Didymopanax grandigemmus (Fiaschi) Fiaschi & G.M.Plunkett
- Didymopanax kollmannii (Fiaschi) Fiaschi & G.M.Plunkett
- Didymopanax longe-petiolatus (Pohl ex DC.) Marchal
- Didymopanax lucumoides Decne. & Planch. ex Marchal
- Didymopanax macrocarpus (Cham. & Schltdl.) Seem.
- Didymopanax malmei Harms
- Didymopanax morototoni (Aubl.) Decne. & Planch.
- Didymopanax pimichinensis (Maguire, Steyerm. & Frodin) Fiaschi & G.M.Plunkett
- Didymopanax plurifolius (Fiaschi & Frodin) Fiaschi & G.M.Plunkett
- Didymopanax plurispicatus (Maguire, Steyerm. & Frodin) Fiaschi & G.M.Plunkett
- Didymopanax prancei (Fiaschi & G.M.Plunkett) Fiaschi & G.M.Plunkett
- Didymopanax pubicarpus (Fiaschi & G.M.Plunkett) Fiaschi & G.M.Plunkett
- Didymopanax quinquecarinatus (Steyerm.) Fiaschi & G.M.Plunkett
- Didymopanax racemifer (Fiaschi & Frodin) Fiaschi & G.M.Plunkett
- Didymopanax ruschianus (Fiaschi & Pirani) Fiaschi & G.M.Plunkett
- Didymopanax selloi Marchal
- Didymopanax tamatamaensis (Maguire, Steyerm. & Frodin) Fiaschi & G.M.Plunkett
- Didymopanax umbrosus (Frodin & Fiaschi) Fiaschi & G.M.Plunkett
- Didymopanax villosissimus (Fiaschi & Pirani) Fiaschi & G.M.Plunkett
- Didymopanax vinosus (Cham. & Schltdl.) Marchal
