= Didymopanax cordatus =

Scientific classification
- Kingdom: Plantae
- Clade: Tracheophytes
- Clade: Angiosperms
- Clade: Eudicots
- Clade: Asterids
- Order: Apiales
- Family: Araliaceae
- Genus: Didymopanax
- Species: D. cordatus

Binomial name
- Didymopanax cordatus Daub

Synonyms
- Schefflera cordata (Taub.) Frodin & Fiaschi

Species of flowering plant

Didymopanax cordatus is a flowering plant in the family Araliaceae. It is native to Brazil.
