= Toco toucan beak =

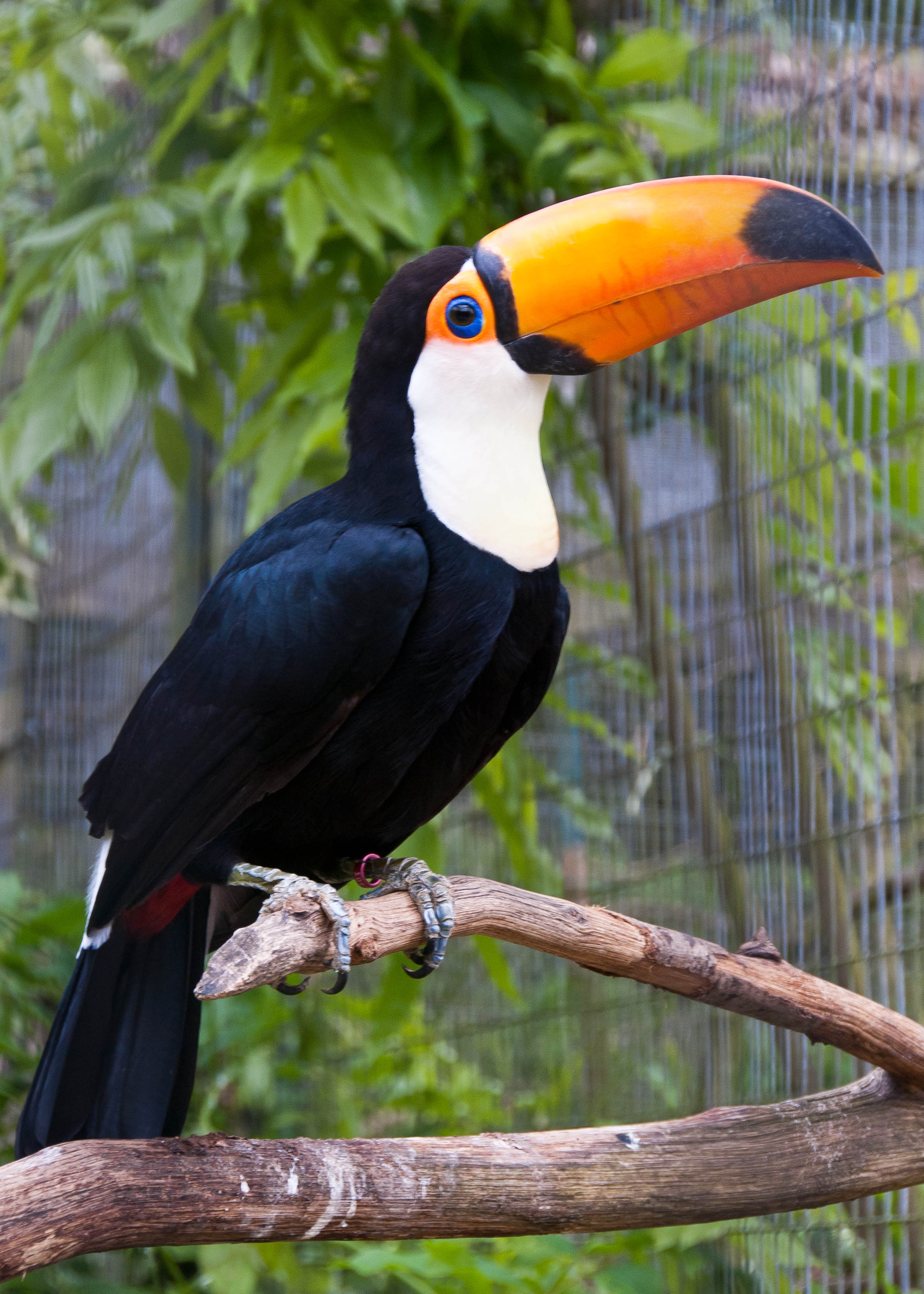
The toco toucan, the largest species of toucan, has a beak that amounts to one third of its body length.

The beak of the toco toucan is integral to their vital social, feeding, foraging, and nest building behaviors. Since the toucan beak does not fully regenerate, it is evolutionarily favorable for it to have robust mechanical properties while still being light enough to allow flight. The beak makes up one-third of the toucan's body length, while contributing to less than three percent of the toucan's weight. The beak structure largely influences its mechanical properties and the lifestyle of the toucan. The beak's properties are increasingly becoming popular in the realm of biomimicry as several industries such as architecture, transportation, and protective equipment can utilize trends of the biological beak structure in manmade designs.

== Structure ==
=== Outer beak ===
The toucan beak has a synergistic sandwich structure with a thin rigid outer shell encapsulating the bulk of the volume which is a cellular solid. The exterior layer, known as the rhamphotheca, is composed of several layers of overlapping sheets of beta keratin . Each keratin sublayer is between 2 and 10 micrometers thick with the entire rhamphotheca stack being 0.5 to 0.75 mm thick, varying by position along the length of the beak. Hexagonal keratin cells with a diameter around 50 micrometers make up the majority of the laminate shell. Each cell boundary and interior are interwoven with a matrix of intermediate filaments with randomly distributed orientations, allowing for the isotropic character of the material. The purpose of the matrix is to act as a viscoelastic medium for dispersing severe impacts to the beak over a greater area, to reduce the effects of local imperfections, protecting it from cracking damage.

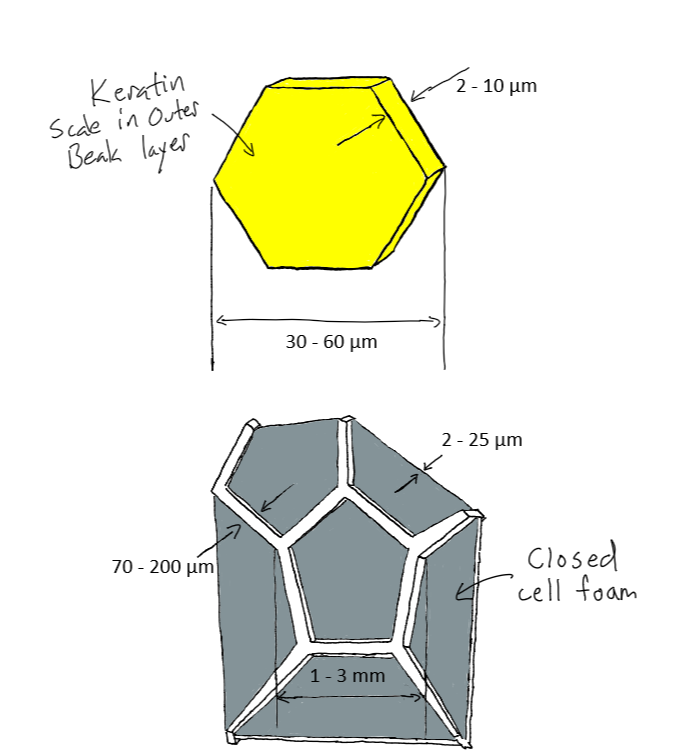
The toucan beak has an outer shell composed of hexagonal keratin tiles and an inner closed cell foam.

Hydroxyapatite mineralization is present but to a lesser extent than in the inner foam. Keratin in the rhamphotheca of the toucan beak has a much lower abundance of sulfur, and therefore the amino acid, cystine, compared to other keratin structures like hair. This indicates less disulfide crosslinking.

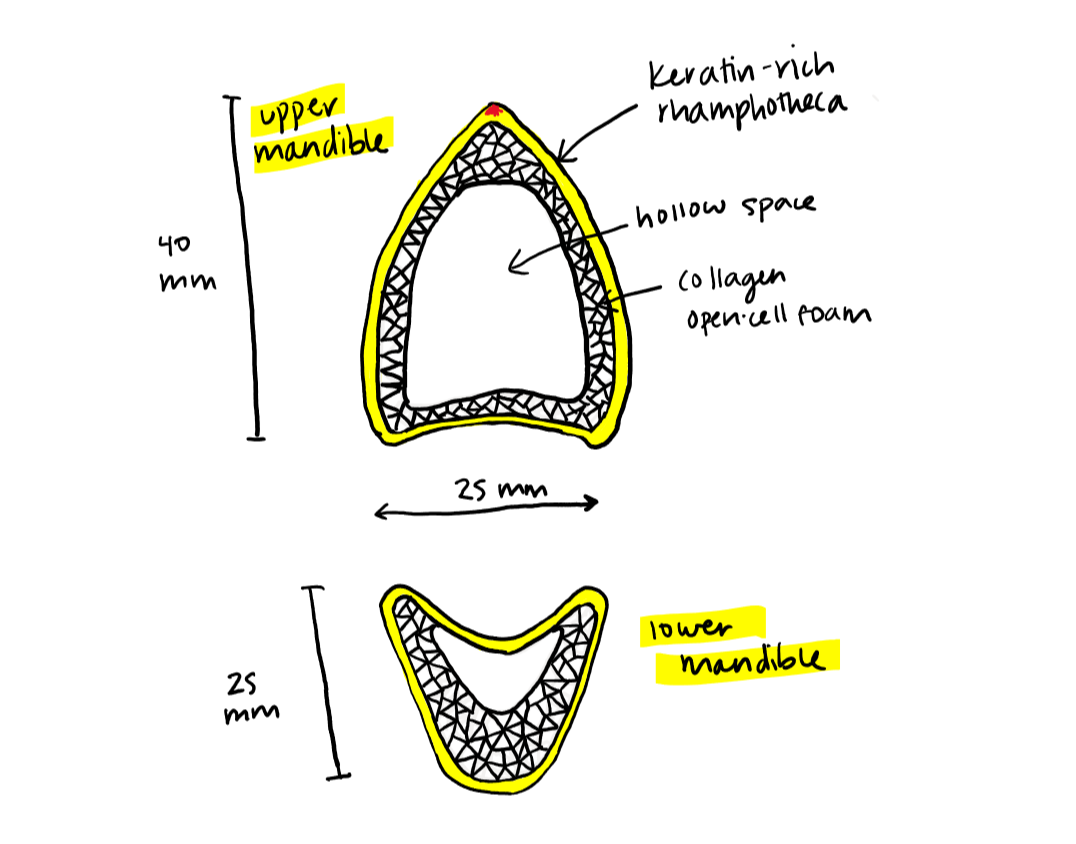
The toucan beak features a synergistic sandwich structure with a thin rigid outer shell layer encapsulating a foam interior. This image shows a cross-section of the upper and lower parts of the toco toucan beak.

=== Inner beak ===
The inner beak is a collagen foam, with a high glycine content and subsequent hardness as in most bones. The fibrous network of collagen trabeculae varies from 70 to 200 micrometers in thickness and are often hollow with an edge connectivity of 3 or above. These, along with even thinner (2 to 25 micrometer) membranes characterize a closed cell foam network which provides the optimal strength at low density for flight consideration. The membranes and trabeculae have higher calcium mineralization content than the dense outer beak. Micro- and nano- indentation testing supports the notion that the inner collagen trabeculae are stronger pound for pound than the outer shell.

== Mechanical and material properties ==
Research has been conducted in order to determine mechanical and material properties of the Toucan Beak. The apparent density of the overall beak is estimated to be between 0.1 and 0.25 grams per cubic centimeter.

=== Outer beak properties ===
The exterior shell of the beak, the rhamphotheca, has a tensile strength of around 50 MPa and a Young's Modulus of 6.7 GPa. From testing the keratin-layer of the beak, it was found the mean value of the Yield Strength is 30 MPa. Further, the yield strength of the beak is sensitive to the strain rate and is associated with the viscoelasticity of the inter-scale glue for the keratin scales. When the yield stress of the beak nears or exceeds the ultimate tensile strength, the fracture of the keratin scales is preferred for the beak over the viscoelastic deformation of the inter-scale glue. In regard to the Young's Modulus and Yield Strength of the keratin in the beak, these values do not change along the longitudinal and transverse direction. The keratin shell can therefore be considered transversely isotropic. The fracture modes of the keratin shell demonstrate a dependence on the strain rate at which the fracture occurs. Testing at lower strain rates revealed a slipping of the scales that is a result of the organic glue being released. For higher strain rates, the keratin scales fractured. Hardness tests were conducted to determine microhardness and nanohardness values for the keratin shell, which are 0.22 ± 0.01 GPa and 0.48 ± 0.06 GPa, respectively.

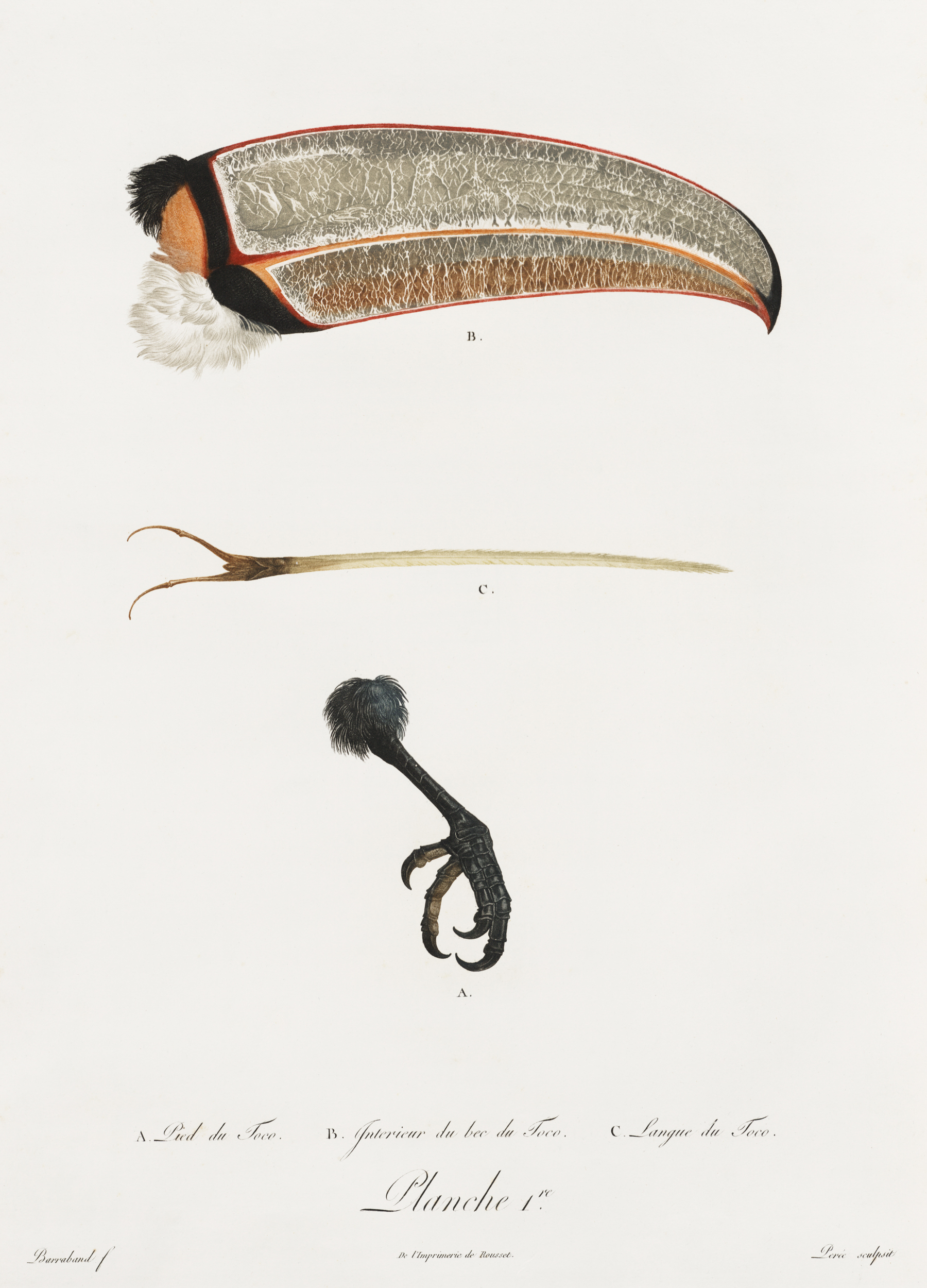
The toco toucan beak (top) has a foam interior that is populated with blood vessels to help it serve as a thermoregulator for the bird.

=== Inner beak properties ===
For the internal foam part of the toucan beak, which is composed of trabeculae, the Young's Modulus was found to be 12.7 GPa, which is higher than that of the outer shell. This difference is due to the calcium content being higher in the foam than that in the keratin shell. The relative density of the foam was found to be 0.09. Tests were conducted to determine the hardness values of the trabecula. The Microhardness value was found to be 0.28 ± 0.03 GPa, and the nano-hardness value was found to be 0.55 ± 0.12 GPa. For the foam of the beak, the crushing stress increased with its density. The mean value found for crushing stress is 0.17 MPa.

== Functions ==
The toucan beak serves several functional roles for the toucan such as acting as a thermal regulator for heat exchange, a tool in feeding, and a method of defense. The toucan has an extreme beak size, with the beak accounting for approximately forty percent of the bird's total body surface area. When compared to other birds, it is noted that the toucan is exposed to some of the warmest monthly temperatures and has the longest beak length. Geographic and temperature variation in beak size has been presumed to relate to resource exploitation and reproduction. Many early researchers assumed to associate beak size with sex-specific traits such as mate selection or vocalization. However, more recently the beak has more closely been linked to its role in physiological homeostasis.

=== Thermoregulation ===
As endothermic organisms, toucans produce their own body heat through metabolism and regulate their body temperature through heat exchange with the environment. Such a heat exchange process occurs usually within an enlarged, uninsulated and well vascularized appendage where blood is able to flow to allow for efficient heat exchange. The toucan beak has a network of superficial blood vessels that support the rhamphotheca, the horny sheath of the bill. The toucan is able to dilate or enlarge the beak's blood vessels when temperatures rise above a thermal neutral zone to allow for blood to pass readily into the beak, allowing for heat exchange and cooling. While below the thermal neutral zone the vessels constrict in order to allow for conservation of metabolic heat. Research has shown that at warmer temperatures, heat is observed throughout the length of the beak in both adult and young toucans, indicating that heat release through the beak is done to cool the toucan body. In colder temperatures, the beak largely maintains the ambient temperature of the environment with only the proximal beak showing warmer temperatures, demonstrating that blood may be shunted away from the beak and kept flowing mostly within the body to maintain warmth. Other research shows that the toucan bill's foam interior and ability to quickly transfer heat renders the bill a liability in colder climates and is the typical reason why toucans commonly sleep with their bills tucked beneath their wings to help aid in heat conservation.

=== Feeding ===
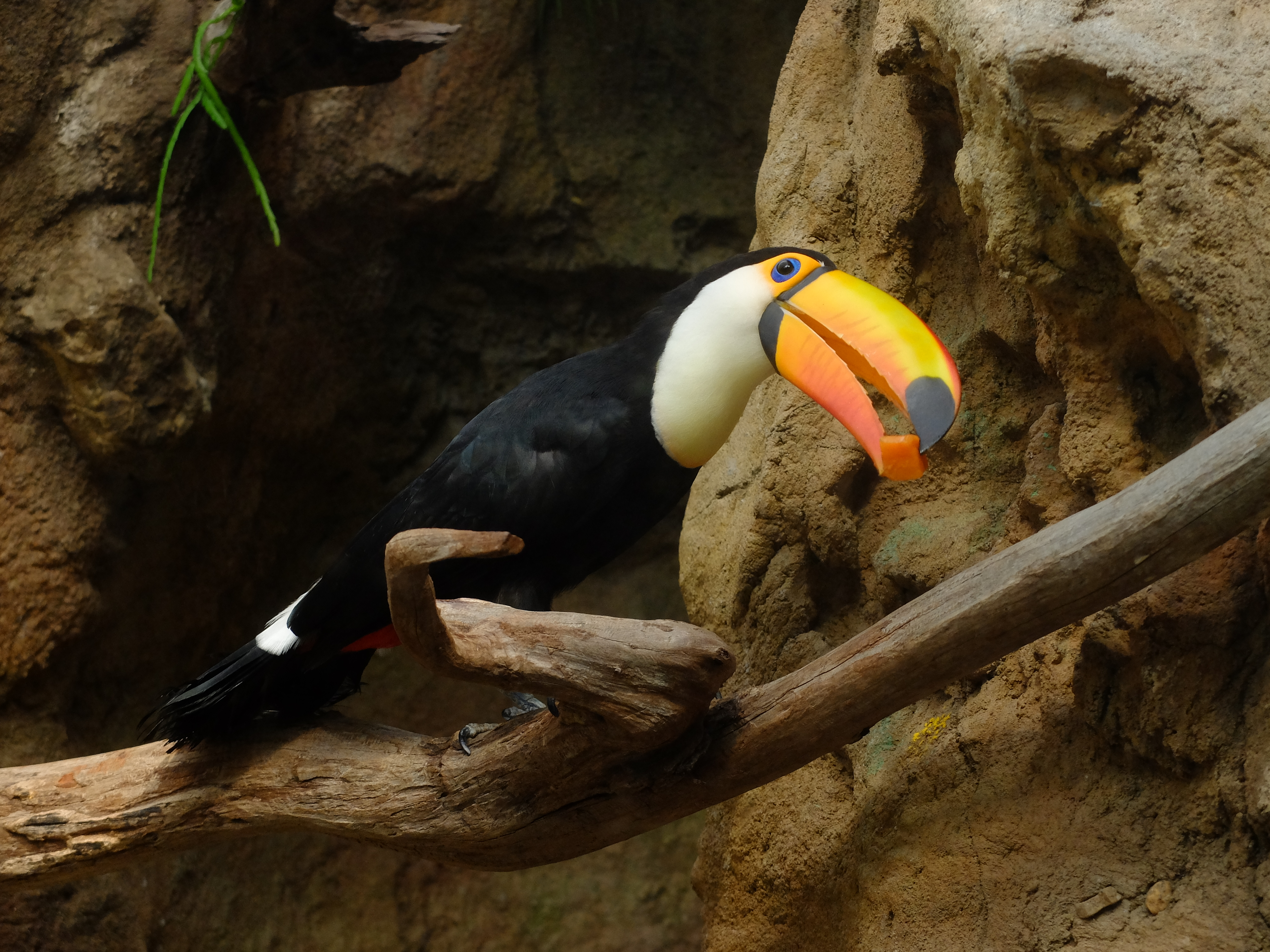
Toucan in Dutch bird park Avifauna

Toucans are omnivorous and feed on food of both plant and animal origin. The large size of the toucan bill enables the bird to crack larger seeds for fuel and easily grasp fruits, vegetables, insects, eggs, and small birds. The longer length of their bill allows toucans to pluck fruit from the tips of tree branches without requiring them to leave a stable position on another branch or perch. The structure of the toucan bill has serrations similar to those of a knife which allows them to easily tear food apart and peel fruits.

=== Defense ===
Toucans' natural predators include forest eagles, hawks, and owls. The birds must also defend themselves from boas, jaguars and margays who sometimes invade toucan nests. To protect themselves, toucans rely heavily on their loud voices that aim to scare off enemies and alert other toucans to the threat of danger. In addition, toucans will strike their bill against a tree or branch as a defensive display of strength. The toucan bill can withstand such compressive strikes against branches due to its previously described structure. Other defensive acts include toucans consuming small baby birds or eggs of other birds. The extreme size of the toucan's bill provides defensive assistance since smaller birds are frightened by both the size and bright colors of the bill. The toucan's beak and its strength, however, are only useful in defense while perched; other birds typically only attack a toucan while it is in flight since the bird cannot defend itself with its beak while flying.

== Biomimicry ==
The unique properties of the toco toucan beak make it a viable option for biomimetic designs, or systems modeled on biological entities. Toucan beaks are responsible for only one twentieth of the entire mass of the creature allowing the bird to fly even with its massive beak. As previously mentioned, the keratin shell and closed-cell foam organization in the toucan beak plays a role in the beak's characteristic energy absorption, compressive resistance, high stiffness and strength features. Additionally, toucan beaks also have insulation capacities. All of the properties of the toucan beak in tandem with its low weight make the beak a valuable biological entity to study for a variety of design applications. However, there are currently only a few applications of the toucan and its beak in biomimetic models.

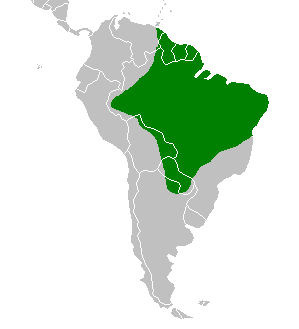
The toco toucan is found in northeastern South America, mainly in Brazil. Here there are designs and architecture that draw inspiration from the properties of the toco toucan's beak.

=== Architecture ===
For example, Brazilian biologist and architect Alessandra Araujo aided in the design of the Votu Hotel in Bahia, Brazil. This hotel was aimed to maintain and support the region's native species. Araujo employed various biomimetic designs for the hotel, such as how prairie dogs utilize burrows to insulate from extreme heat, the saguaro cactus' self-shading ability, and the native bird - the toco toucan - beak which plays a role as an extremely efficient thermal regulator. Specifically in the layout of the hotel, Araujo chose to design the kitchens of the rooms at the Votu hotel after the toco toucan's beak. Since one of the goals of this hotel was to minimize air conditioning and electricity consumption, the kitchen schematics were inspired by the toucan's ability to live with large temperature swings like having extremely hot days and cool nights. As the heat produced in the kitchen areas rises to the ceiling, it is drawn into a copper coil that passes through rooftop soil on the hotel. Air cools in the shade of a rooftop garden, and eventually returns to the kitchen. This system allows the hotel to have a natural air conditioner which requires no additional energy.

=== Protective equipment ===
Many potential biomimetic applications based on the characteristics of the toucan beak are currently hypothetical ideas that have not yet been employed. Among the most popular ideas is using the toucan beak to design personal protective wear like helmets. Helmets are very important for the safety of individuals riding bikes, motorcycles, for rock climbers, athletes, and more. However, the heavy, awkward, and uncomfortable wear of helmets can lead to people taking them off and risking a head injury. By integrating characteristics of a toucan beak into new helmet design, the risk of head injury might decrease since new designs may provide a more comfortable, lighter, thinner, but stronger protective piece. Such new helmets or protective equipment draw inspiration from toucan beaks by having a light mass but immense strength. Additionally, the aesthetic of these new helmets could be improved with a thinner, less bulky design, and could eliminate the hesitation to wear helmets because of their unpleasing appearance. Similar to helmets, the toucan beak features could also be incorporated into football crash pads and other protective gear whose innovative design would reduce bulkiness prevent interference with activity performance. Some current protective wear inhibits athletic ability, such as bulky knee pads hindering skaters’ speeds.

=== Other ===
More general possible applications for the toucan beak design are creating crash resistant vehicles without compromising fuel economy. These possibilities can draw on the toucan beak's energy absorption capacity created by its structural properties. A famous materials researcher, Meyers, studied toucan beaks extensively and suggested another application for cars: the creation of car panels that are lighter, stronger, and safer than current panels. Meyers also noted the ability for the toucan beak design, specifically the ultra-lightness, to be incorporated into aircraft or other vehicle components.

Another situation in which the toucan, though not specifically the beak features, was employed was for the "Beak Laser Projector". This projector" is a portable projector drawing inspiration from the toucan's ability to tuck its long beak against its neck and under its wings. This design allowed the projector to achieve its goal of "skull" rotation and simultaneously provided a product with better usability, convenience, and most compact form.

== In popular culture ==
In the Finnish video game series Angry Birds, the green toucan character Hal is given a long, massive beak with a boomerang-like structure that allows him to do something called "boomeranging", which is actually turning back in the direction towards the starting point.
