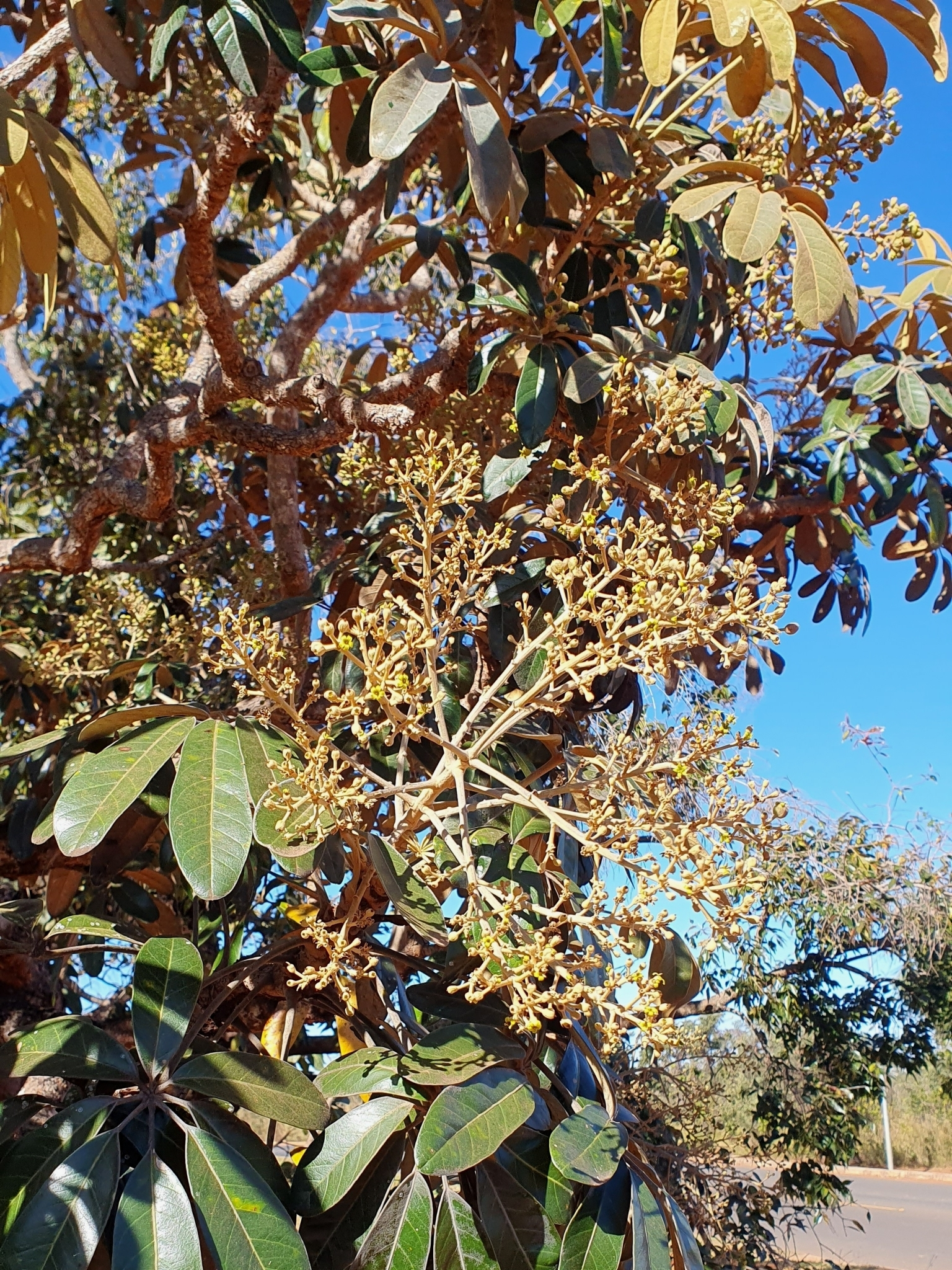

Conservation status
- Least Concern (IUCN 3.1)

Scientific classification
- Kingdom: Plantae
- Clade: Tracheophytes
- Clade: Angiosperms
- Clade: Eudicots
- Clade: Asterids
- Order: Apiales
- Family: Araliaceae
- Genus: Didymopanax
- Species: D. macrocarpus

Binomial name
- Didymopanax macrocarpus (Cham. & Schltdl.) Seem.

Synonyms
- List: Panax macrocarpus Cham. & Schltdl.; Schefflera macrocarpa (Cham. & Schltdl.) Frodin

= Didymopanax macrocarpus =

Species of flowering plant

Didymopanax macrocarpus is a tree and grows primarily in the seasonally dry tropical biome. It is native to the central and eastern Brazil.

== Description ==
This plant is a small tree or treelet, typically standing between 0.5 and 5 m (1.6 and 16.4 ft) tall, though some can reach up to 9 m (30 ft). Its branches have loose, light brown or ochre bark that tends to fall apart when dry. The leaves are palmately compound, clustering at the branch tips, with leaf stalks (petioles) ranging from 5.5 to 37 cm (2.2 to 14.6 in) long. Each leaf consists of 3 to 9 thick, leathery leaflets that measure 4 to 20 cm (1.6 to 7.9 in) long and 1.5 to 9 cm (0.59 to 3.54 in) wide, featuring smooth edges and rounded tips.

The leaf venation is pronounced, with a main vein visible on both surfaces and secondary veins more prominent on the underside. The plant produces terminal flower clusters that can be erect or drooping, becoming pendulous as the fruit develops. These clusters are densely covered in soft hairs, adding a distinctive texture to the plant's appearance.

This plant can be distinguished from other species of the Didymopanax group by the frequent presence of a loose exfoliating bark in dry material, leaflets with coriaceous blades and persistently light brown or ochre to grayish villous indumentum abaxially, a usually rounded, large (4.5 mm–8 mm × 8 mm–15 mm (0.2 in–0.3 in × 0.3 in–0.6 in)), and very fleshy fruits.

== Distribution and habitat ==
Didymopanax macrocarpus is common in the eastern region of Brazilian Cerrado. It can be found in the states of Bahia, Goiás, eastern Mato Grosso, Minas Gerais, São Paulo, and the Distrito Federal.

== Life cycle ==
Didymopanax macrocarpus flowers and form fruits all year around.
