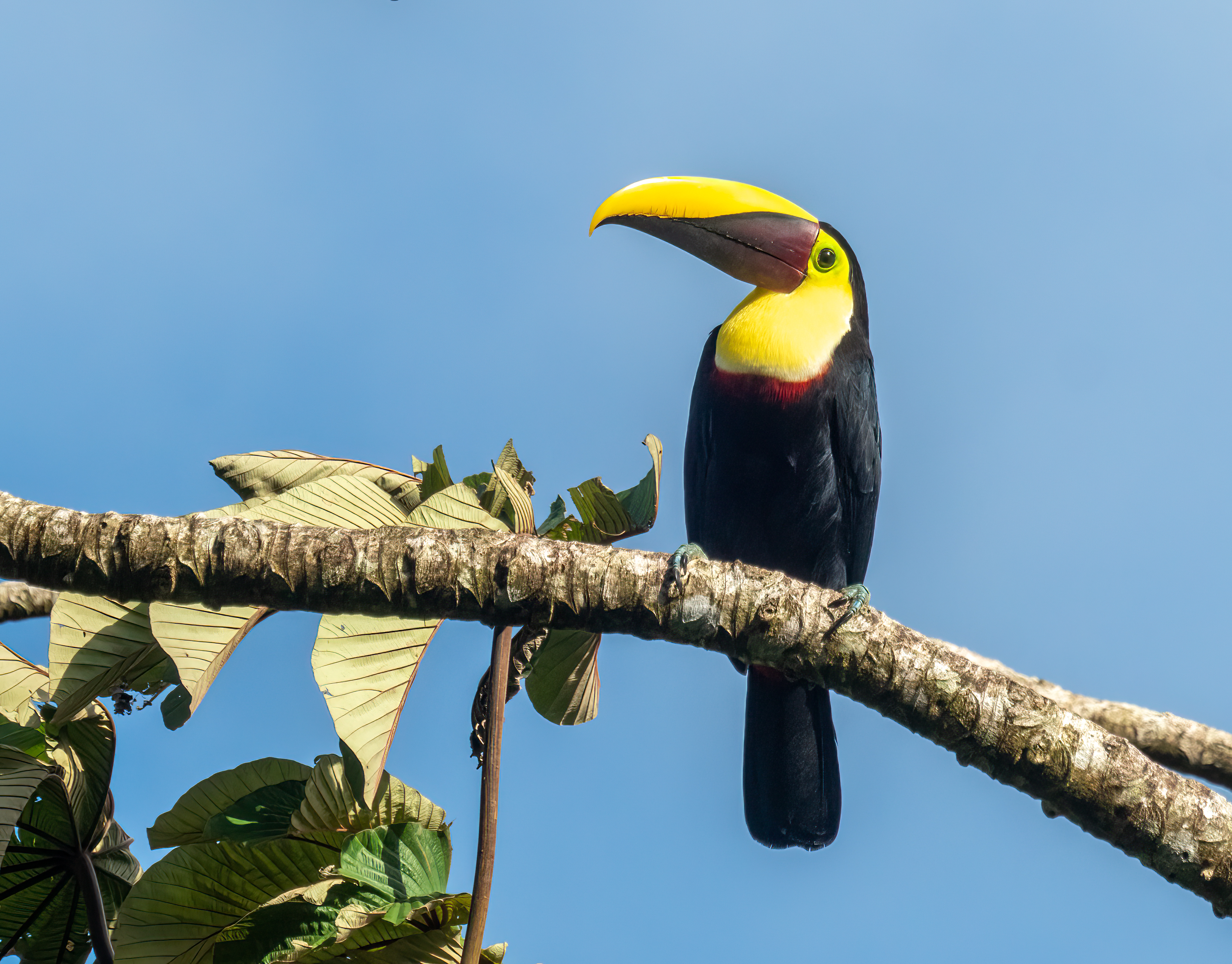
- R. a. swainsonii in Costa Rica

Conservation status
- Least Concern (IUCN 3.1)

Scientific classification
- Kingdom: Animalia
- Phylum: Chordata
- Class: Aves
- Order: Piciformes
- Family: Ramphastidae
- Genus: Ramphastos
- Species: R. ambiguus

Binomial name
- Ramphastos ambiguus Swainson, 1823

Subspecies
- See text

= Yellow-throated toucan =

Species of bird

The yellow-throated toucan (Ramphastos ambiguus) is a Least Concern species of bird in the family Ramphastidae, the toucans, toucanets, and aracaris. It is found from Honduras south into northern South America and beyond to Peru.

== Taxonomy and systematics ==
Three subspecies of yellow-throated toucan are recognized:

Image	Subspecies	Distribution
	"Chestnut-mandibled" toucan, R. a. swainsonii - (Gould, 1833)	from southeastern Honduras through Nicaragua, Costa Rica, Panama, and western Colombia to southwestern Ecuador
	"Black-mandibled" toucan (in part), the nominate R. a. ambiguus - Swainson, 1823	from southwestern Colombia on the eastern slope of the Andes, through Ecuador to south-central Peru
	"Black-mandibled" toucan (in part), R. a. abbreviatus - Cabanis, 1862	northeastern Colombia and northwestern and northern Venezuela

All three subspecies were originally described as separate species. R. a. abbreviatus was relatively early reassigned as a subspecies of R. a. ambiguus. Subspecies R. a. swainsonii differs from ambiguus by 1.35% in mitochondrial DNA which led to its treatment as a species by major taxonomies until about 2010.

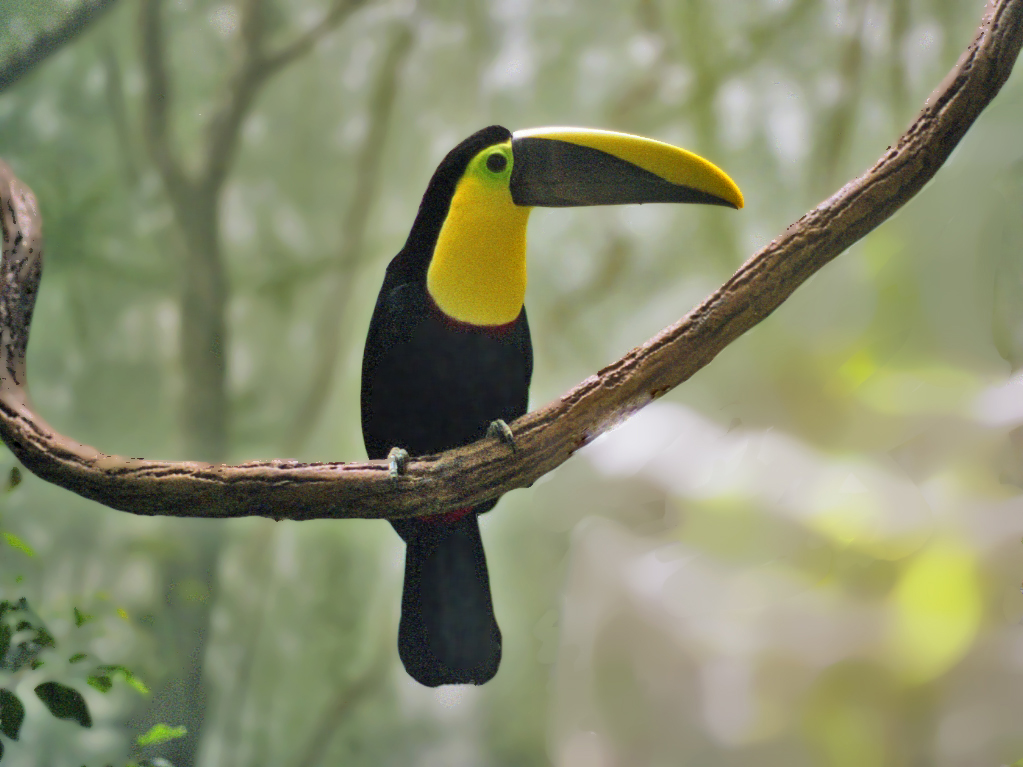
Ramphastos ambiguus at the Bronx Zoo

== Description ==
The yellow-throated toucan is 47 to 61 cm (19 to 24 in) long and weighs 584 to 746 g (1.3 to 1.6 lb). The three subspecies differ little in their dimensions, though females' bills are shorter than males' in all three. Bill lengths vary between 15.1 and 19.8 cm (5.9 and 7.8 in) in males and 12.9 and 16.0 cm (5.1 and 6.3 in) in females. Other measurements differ little by sex. Their wing chord is 20.4 to 24.8 cm (8.0 to 9.8 in), their tail length is 14.0 to 16.2 cm (5.5 to 6.4 in), and their tarsus is 4.7 to 5.5 cm (1.9 to 2.2 in) long.

The yellow-throated toucan's subspecies have essentially the same plumage. They are mostly black, with a maroon tint to the hindneck and upper back and white uppertail coverts. Their face, throat, and upper breast are bright yellow with white and crimson bands below the breast. Their vent and undertail coverts are bright red. The bare skin around their eye does differ: sky blue in the nominate R. a. ambiguus, yellow green in R. a. abbreviatus, and varying between yellow and bright green in R. a. swainsonii. The three subspecies' bills differ as well. All have a mostly yellow maxilla with a greenish yellow stripe on the culmen and a thin black line at the base. The nominate and R. a. abbreviatus have black mandibles; R. a. swainsonii' is maroon to reddish chestnut brown.

== Distribution and habitat ==
The "chestnut mandibled" R. a. swainsonii primarily inhabits lowland evergreen primary forest and also occurs in gallery forest, older secondary forest, and well-treed parks and gardens. It shuns dry forest and large open areas but can be found in plantations with fruiting trees that border forest. The two "black-mandibled" subspecies are usually found in the interior of humid primary montane forest but also occur at its edges and clearings and in older secondary forest. In Ecuador the "chestnut-mandibled" is found from sea level to 1,000 m (3,300 ft), in Colombia below 2,000 m (6,600 ft), and in Costa Rica to 1,200 m (3,900 ft). The "black-mandibled" occurs between 1,000 and 1,600 m (3,300 and 5,200 ft) in Ecuador and up to 2,500 m (8,200 ft) in Colombia.

== Behavior ==
=== Movement ===
As far as is known the yellow-throated toucan is a year-round resident throughout its range.

=== Feeding ===
Most of the data on the yellow-throated toucan's diet and foraging behavior are from studies of the wide-ranging R. a. swainsonii. It is primarily a fruit eater, with small amounts of animal matter such as insects and other arthropods, small lizards, and the eggs and young of other birds. Most of the animal matter is apparently fed to nestlings. The species forages mainly in the forest canopy, singly, in pairs, or in small groups, but also retrieves fallen fruit from the ground. They take fruit by hopping from branch to branch and may hang upside down to reach it. Though the species is not territorial, individuals often defend a single fruiting tree.

=== Breeding ===
The yellow-throated toucan's breeding season varies latitudinally, from March to June in Costa Rica, January to July in Panama and Colombia, and between December and May in Ecuador. Males allopreen and courtship-feed females. The species nests in tree cavities formed by rot; they may enlarge it but cannot truly excavate. The cavity is typically between 9 and 30 m (30 and 98 ft) above the ground. The clutch size is thought to be two or three eggs. The incubation period and time to fledging are not known. Both parents defend the nest and care for young.

=== Vocal and non-vocal sounds ===
The yellow-throated toucan's primary vocalization is "a series of loud, far-carrying yelps." The call is somewhat variable in tempo and the number of notes. It has been transcribed as "Díos te dé te dé", which translates from Spanish as "God give you". The species calls year round, usually from the tops of trees, and especially near dawn and dusk. It also "grunts, croaks, and rattles loudly in aggressive displays." In flight its wings rustle due to notches in the two outer primaries.

== Status ==
The IUCN has assessed the yellow-throated toucan as Least Concern. It has a very large range, and its population is decreasing, but not at a rate that would merit a Vulnerable assessment. The major threat is continuing conversion of its forest habitat to agriculture and ranching; hunting is also a threat. "Yellow-throated Toucan is able to tolerate some human disturbance and forest alteration, but is nonetheless affected greatly by habitat loss."
