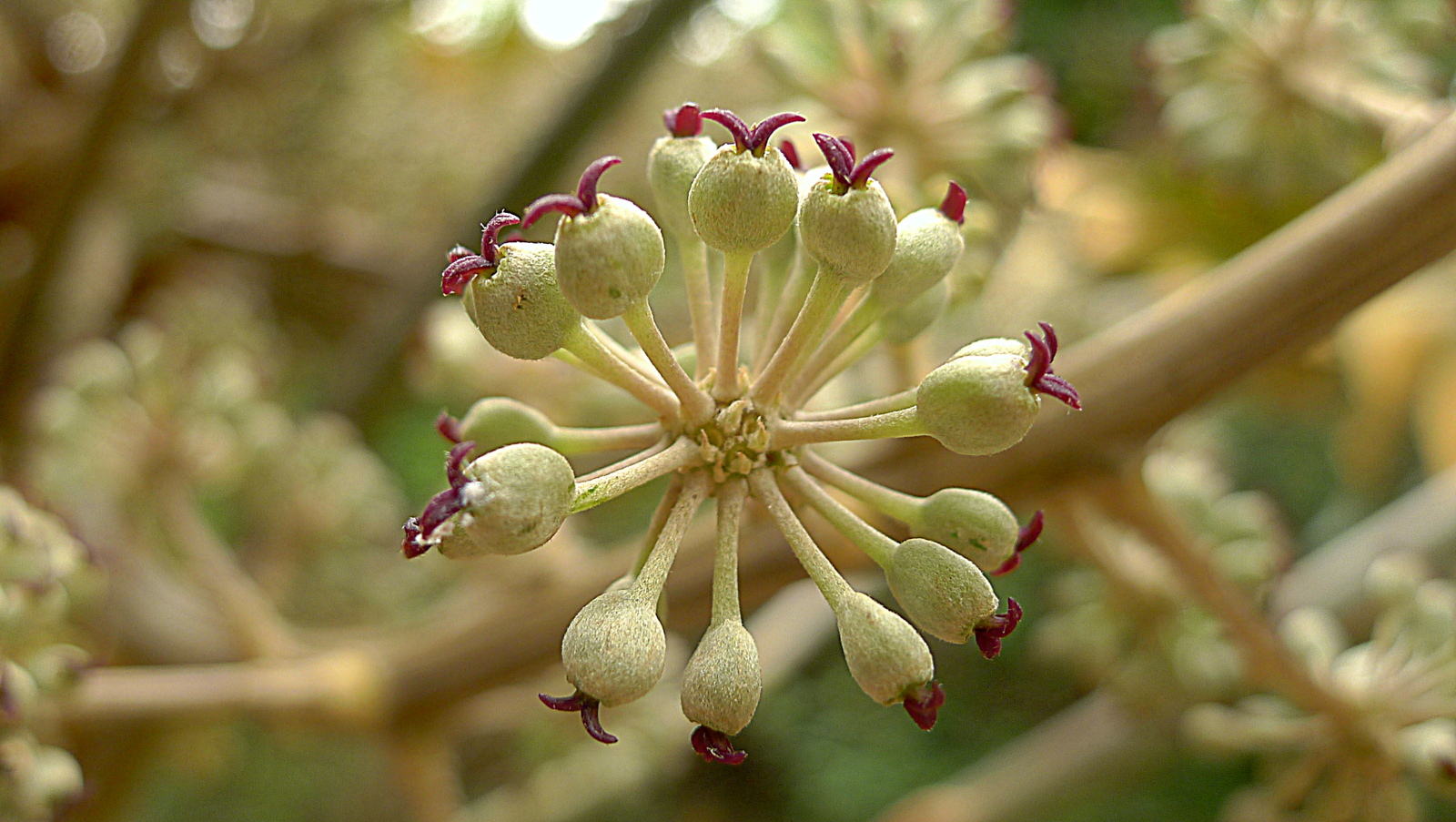

Conservation status
- Least Concern (IUCN 3.1)

Scientific classification
- Kingdom: Plantae
- Clade: Tracheophytes
- Clade: Angiosperms
- Clade: Eudicots
- Clade: Asterids
- Order: Apiales
- Family: Araliaceae
- Genus: Didymopanax
- Species: D. morototoni

Binomial name
- Didymopanax morototoni (Aubl.) Decne. & Planch. (1854)

Synonyms
- Synonymy: Aralia micans Willd. ex Schult. (1820); Didymopanax calophyllus Decne. & Planch. (1868), nom. nud.; Didymopanax chrysophyllus (Vahl) Decne. & Planch. (1854); Didymopanax micans (Willd. ex Schult.) Krug & Urb. (1899); Didymopanax morototoni var. poeppigii Marchal (1878); Didymopanax morototoni var. sessiliflorus Marchal (1878); Didymopanax poeppigii Decne. & Planch. (1854); Didymopanax speciosus (Willd.) Decne. & Planch. (1854); Didymopanax splendens (Kunth) Decne. & Planch. ex Seem. (1868); Didymopanax splendidus Planch. ex Linden (1855); Didymopanax undulatus Decne. & Planch. ex C.Wright (1869); Oreopanax morototoni (Aubl.) Pittier (1923); Panax chrysophyllus Vahl (1797); Panax morototoni Aubl. (1775); Panax speciosus Willd. (1806); Panax spinosus Poir. (1812); Panax splendens Kunth (1821); Panax undulatus Kunth (1821), nom. illeg.; Schefflera morototoni (Aubl.) Maguire, Steyerm. & Frodin (1984); Schefflera morototoni var. sessiliflorus (Marchal) Frodin (2003 publ. 2004); Schefflera splendens (Kunth) Frodin ex Lindeman (1986); Sciodaphyllum paniculatum Britton (1891)

= Didymopanax morototoni =

Species of tree

Didymopanax morototoni (yagrumo macho) is a timber tree native to southern Mexico, the Greater Antilles, Central America, and South America. It grows in a variety of habitats, such as the Caatinga, Cerrado, and Amazon rainforest of Brazil.
