= Alena =

- Gender: Female

Other names
- Related names: Alyona, Alenka, Lena, Lenka

Alena is a feminine given name. It may be derived either from the name Helene or as a diminutive form of Magdalena.

In the Balkans, this spelling of the name is predominantly found among the peoples of the former Yugoslav nations, specifically among the Bosniaks and Croats. This region also has a male equivalent: Alen.

The name is also found in the Czech Republic, Slovak Republic, Ukraine, Belarus and Russia, where the spelling Alyona is also used.

== Given name ==
- Saint Alena (died 640), Christian saint
- Alena Abramchuk (born 1988), Belarusian track and field athlete
- Alena Adanichkina (born 1992), Russian triathlete
- Alena Aladava (1907–1986), Belarusian art historian and curator
- Alena Alekseeva (born 1989), Russian swimmer
- Alena Amialiusik (born 1989), Belarusian cyclist
- Alena Andreeva (born 1997), Russian footballer
- Alena Anisim (born 1962), Belarusian politician and linguist
- Alena Antalová (born 1972), Slovak actress
- Alena Arshinova (born 1985), Russian politician, model and sociologist
- Alena Arzamasskaia (died 1670), Russian military rebel
- Alena Aurum (born 2009), Russian video blogger
- Alena Baeva (born 1985), Luxembourgish violinist
- Alena Bartošová (born 1944), Czech cross-country skier
- Alena Belyaeva (born 1992), Russian footballer
- Alena Benešová (born 1998), Czech swimmer
- Alena Bienz (born 2003), Swiss association football player
- Alena Bílková (born 1946), Czech printmaker and glass artist
- Alena Brooks (born 1991), Trinidad and Tobago middle-distance runner
- Alena Buyx (born 1977), German medicine ethicist and university teacher
- Alena Černáková (born 1961), Czech gymnast
- Alena Chadimová (born 1931), Czech gymnast
- Alena Damitšová (born 1962), Slovak handball player
- Alena Douhan, Belarusian diplomat
- Alena Dřevjaná (born 1969), Czech artistic gymnast
- Alena Dylko (born 1988), Belarusian cyclist
- Alena Evdokimova, Russian wheelchair fencer
- Alena Fedarynchyk (born 1993), Belarusian volleyball player
- Alena Filipava (born 1987), Belarusian wrestler
- Alena Fink-Trauschel (born 1999), German politician
- Alena Fomina-Klotz (born 1989), Russian tennis player
- Alena Furman (born 1991), Belarusian rower
- Alena Gerber (born 1989), German model, actress and television host
- Alena Hájková (1924–2012), Czech activist and historian
- Alena Hanáková (born 1958), Czech politician and culture minister
- Alena Hanušová (born 1991), Czech basketball player
- Alena Hatvani (died 2021), Czech female bodybuilder
- Alena Havrlíková (born 1977), Czech tennis player
- Alena Holubeva (born 1994), Belarusian basketball player
- Alena Horalová (born 1952), Czech handball player
- Alena Hromádková (1943–2024), Czech economist, politician and academic
- Alena Ivanchenko (born 2003), Uzbekistani cyclist
- Alena Ivanova (born 1989), Kazakhstani volleyball player
- Alena Kánová (born 1980), Slovak para table tennis player and wheelchair curler
- Alena Kanysheva (born 2005), Russian ice dancer
- Alena Kartashova (born 1982), Russian wrestler
- Alena Kašová (born 1960), Slovak basketball player
- Alena Kaufman (born 1987), Russian paralympic biathlete and skier
- Alena Khamulkina (born 1997), Belarusian diver
- Alena Kholod (born 1995), Russian acrobatic gymnast
- Alena Kish (1889–1949), Belarusian primitivist painter
- Alena Kiyevich (born 1987), Belarusian sprinter
- Alena Konečná (born 1984), Czech cyclist
- Alena Kostornaia (born 2003), Russian figure skater
- Alena Kovačková (born 2008), Czech tennis player
- Alena Kováčová (born 1978), Slovak basketball player
- Alena Krechyk (born 1987), Belarusian hammer thrower
- Alena Kucera, Swiss slalom canoeist
- Alena Kučerová (1935–2026), Czech printmaker
- Alena Kupchyna (born 1965), Belarusian diplomat
- Alena Kupčíková (born 1976), Czech artist
- Alena Kyselicová (born 1957), Slovak field hockey player
- Alena V. Ledeneva (born 1964), British sociologist
- Alena Leonova (born 1990), Russian figure skater
- Alena Marx (born 2000), Swiss slalom canoeist
- Alena Matejka (Alena Matějková, born 1966), Czech sculptor and glass designer
- Alena Matoshka (born 1982), Belarusian hammer thrower
- Alena Mazouka (born 1967), Belarusian long-distance runner
- Alena Mihulová (born 1965), Czech actress
- Alena Mornštajnová (born 1963), Czech writer and translator
- Alena Mrvová (born 1978), Slovak chess player
- Alena Murang, Malaysian singer-songwriter, sape player, visual artist and educator
- Alena Nazdrova (born 1998), Belarusian canoeist
- Alena Newmyarzhytskaya (born 1980), Belarusian sprinter
- Alena Olsen (born 1995), American rugby player
- Alena Özel (born 1984), Belarusian volleyball player
- Alena Palečková (born 1947), Czech politician and zoologist
- Alena Palmeová-West (born 1945), Czech professional tennis player
- Alena Pasechnik (born 1995), Belarusian shot putter
- Alena Paulenková (born 1979), Slovak tennis player
- Alena Peterková (born 1960), Czech runner
- Alena Poláčková (born 1964), Slovak judge
- Alena Polenská (born 1990), Czech ice hockey player
- Alena Polozkova (born 1979), Belarusian gymnast
- Alena Popchanka (born 1979), Belarusian swimmer
- Alena Popova (born 1997), Kazakhstani volleyball player
- Alena Postlová (1939–2005), Czechoslovak rower
- Alena Potůčková (1953–2018), Czech art historian
- Alena Procházková (born 1984), Slovak cross-country skier
- Alena Prokopenko (born 1992), Russian judoka
- Alena Prosková (born 1948), Czech athlete
- Alena Prouzová, Czechoslovak slalom canoeist
- Alena Reichová (1933–2011), Czech gymnast
- Alena Reji (born 1999), Indian cyclist
- Alena Rojas (born 1992), Cuban volleyball player
- Alena Šafářová (born 1968), Czech table tennis player
- Alena Saili (born 1998), New Zealand rugby union player
- Alena Sannikova (born 1980), Belarusian cross-country skier
- Alena Schillerová (born 1964), Czech politician and lawyer
- Alena Šeredová (born 1978), Czech model
- Alena Serzhantova (born 1998), Russian water polo player
- Alena Sharp (born 1981), Canadian professional golfer
- Alena Shirmanova (born 1999), Czech singer known as Aiko
- Alena Shishkova (born 1992), Russian model
- Alena Smith, American screenwriter
- Alena Sobaleva (born 1993), Belarusian hammer thrower
- Alena Šolcová (born 1950), Czech mathematician and science historian
- Alena Stellnerová (born 1989), Czech handball player
- Alena Stolzová (born 1937), Czech sprinter
- Alena Svobodová (born 1957), Czech rower
- Alena Tiron (born 1993), Russian rugby union player
- Alena Trapeznikova (born 1987), Russian ski-orienteering competitor
- Alena Tseliapushkina (born 1969), Belarusian equestrian
- Alena Vachovcová (born 1974), Czech table tennis player
- Alena Varmužová (1939–1997), Czech mathematician
- Alena Vašková (born 1975), Czech tennis player
- Alena Veselá (1923–2025), Czech organist and music teacher
- Alena Vinnitskaya (athlete) (born 1973), Belarusian marathon runner
- Alena Vinnitskaya (born 1974), Ukrainian singer, songwriter and TV presenter
- Alena Vránová (born 1932), Czech actress
- Alena Vrzáňová (1931–2015), Czech athlete, figure skater
- Alena Vylegzhanina (born 1987), Russian water polo player
- Alena Wagnerová (born 1936), Czech author and journalist
- Alena Analeigh Wicker (born 2008), American, youngest Black person to be accepted into medical school in the United States
- Alena Zavarzina (born 1989), Russian snowboarder

== Fictional characters ==
- Alena (Encantadia), a fictional character who possesses the Gem of Water on several Filipino telefantasyas
- Alena Vorshevsky, a fictional character from Call of Duty: Modern Warfare 3
- Alena, a fictional character from Dragon Quest IV

== See also ==
- Aleena (disambiguation)
- Alina (disambiguation)
- Alyona
- Elena (given name)
