= Alina =

Alina or Aleena
- Gender: Female
- Language: Romanian, Slavic languages, Greek, German, Arabic

Origin
- Origin: Romanian, Slavic, German, Greek, Arabic
- Meaning: German origin meaning "noble" as a Latinate form of Aline, a Germanic contraction of Adelina (little noble one), which is diminutive form of Adelaide. Thought by some to be of Slavic origin meaning "bright, beautiful." Others believe in its Greek origins, meaning "light" or "truth" as a variation of Helen. In Arabic, it means "delicate" or "soft."

Alina is a feminine given name with multiple origins in different cultures. It might be a form of Aline, which originated as a shortened form of Adeline, meaning noble. It has been used in Scotland as a feminine version of Alistair, the Scottish form of Alexander, and as an English version of the Scottish Gaelic álainn, meaning beautiful. In some instances, it might have Arabic origins. The name has also been well-used in German-speaking countries. It is sometimes regarded as a form of the name Helen, meaning to shine. Alina was one of the top 10 most popular names in Switzerland and one of the top 50 most popular names in Finland, Norway, Germany, Austria and Pakistan in 2020.

== Notable people ==
=== A–G ===
- Alina Baikova (born 1989), Ukrainian model and businesswoman
- Alina Baraz (born 1993), American singer
- Alina Bârgăoanu, Romanian university professor
- Alina Boz (born 1998), Russian-born Turkish actress
- Alina Bronsky (born 1978), Russian-born German writer
- Alina Bucur, Romanian-born mathematician and university professor
- Alina Cała (born 1953), Polish writer, historian and sociologist
- Alina Chan, Canadian molecular biologist
- Alina Cho, American television correspondent
- Alina Cojocaru (born 1981), Romanian ballet dancer
- Alina Devecerski (born 1983), Swedish singer
- Alina Alexandra Dumitru (born 1982), Romanian judoka
- Alina Eremia (born 1993), Romanian singer
- Alina Fernández (born 1956), daughter of Fidel Castro and Natalia Revuelta Clews
- Alina Forsman (1845–1899), Finnish sculptor
- Alina Frasa (1834–1899), Finnish ballerina
- Alina Garciamendez (born 1991), Mexican-American footballer
- Alina Gorbacheva (born 2007), Russian figure skater
- Alina Goreac (born 1952), Romanian artistic gymnast
- Alina Gorghiu (born 1978), Romanian lawyer and politician
- Alina Gorlova (born 1992), Ukrainian filmmaker, director, and screenwriter
- Alina Grosu (born 1995), Ukrainian singer
- Alina Gut (born 1938), Polish politician

=== H–N ===
- Alina Habba (born 1984), American lawyer
- Alina Harnasko (born 2001), Belarusian rhythmic gymnast
- Alina l'Ami (born 1985), Romanian chess player
- Alina Iagupova (born 1992), Ukrainian basketball player
- Alina Ibragimova (born 1985), Russian-British violinist
- Alina Ilie (born 1996), Romanian handballer
- Alina Iordache (born 1982), Romanian handballer
- Alina Ivanova (born 1969), Russian race walker
- Alina Jägerstedt (1858–1919), Swedish social democratic and trade unionist
- Alina Jidkova (born 1977), Russian tennis player
- Alina Kabata-Pendias (1929–2019), Polish scientist
- Alina Kabayeva (born 1983), Russian rhythmic gymnast, mistress of Vladimir Putin
- Alina Kham (born 1959), Russian field hockey player
- Alina Khan, Pakistani transgender actress
- Alina Kolomiets (born 2006), Bulgarian rhythmic gymnast
- Alina Komashchuk (born 1993), Ukrainian sabre fencer
- Alina Korneeva (born 2007), Russian professional tennis player
- Alina Kostornaia (born 2003), Russian figure skater
- Alina Kozich (born 1987), Ukrainian artistic gymnast
- Alina Kukushkin (born 2002), Russian voice actress known for her role in the animated series Masha and the Bear
- Alina Levshin (born 1984), German-Ukrainian actress
- Alina Lipp, German pro-Russian propagandist
- Alina Lozano (born 1965), Colombian actress and writer
- Alina Maksimenko (born 1991), Ukrainian rhythmic gymnast
- Alina Martain (late 11th century-1125), French nun and saint
- Alina Melnyk (born 2005), Ukrainian rhythmic gymnast
- Alina Militaru (born 1982), Romanian long jumper
- Alina Müller (born 1998), Swiss ice hockey player
- Alina Mungiu-Pippidi (born 1964), political scientist, academic, journalist, and writer
- Alina Nastase (born 1990), Romanian-Spanish actress, model, director and producer
- Allina Ndebele (born 1939), South African artist and weaver

=== O–Z ===
- Alina Orlova (born 1988), Lithuanian sung poetry singer and musician
- Alina Ott (born 2009), German rhythmic gymnast
- Alina Panainte (born 1988), Romanian sprinter
- Alina Panova, American film producer and film and stage costume designer
- Alina Pash (born 1993), Ukrainian singer, rapper and songwriter
- Alina Pätz (born 1990), Swiss curler
- Alina Pienkowska (1952–2002), Polish free trade union activist and a Senator for Gdańsk
- Alina Plugaru (born 1987), Romanian entrepreneur and pornographic film actress
- Alina Pogostkina (born 1983), Russian-born German violinist
- Alina Poloziuk (born 2002), Ukrainian fencer
- Alina Popa (born 1978), Romanian bodybuilder
- Alina Puscau (born 1981), Romanian model, actress and singer
- Alina Reh (born 1997), German long-distance runner
- Alina Reyes (born 1956), French writer
- Alina Romanowski (born 1955), American diplomat
- Alina Rosenberg (born 1992), German Paralympic equestrian
- Alina Sanko, Russian model and beauty pageant titleholder
- Alina Vera Savin (born 1988), Romanian bobsledder
- Alina Șerban (born 1987), Romanian actress
- Alina Shpak (born 1980), Ukrainian archivist
- Alina Shynkarenko (born 1998), Ukrainian synchro swimmer
- Alina Smith (born 1991), Russian-American pop singer-songwriter and record producer
- Alina Somova (born 1985), Russian ballet dancer
- Alina Stănculescu (born 1990), Romanian artistic gymnast
- Alina Stremous (born 1995), Moldovan biathlete
- Alina Surmacka Szczesniak (1925–2016), Polish-born American food scientist
- Alina Szapocznikow (1926–1973), Polish sculptor and holocaust survivor
- Alina Talay (born 1989), Belarusian track and field athlete
- Alina Tugend, American journalist, writer and public speaker
- Alina Tumilovich (born 1990), Belarusian rhythmic gymnast
- Alina Ustimkina (born 2000), Russian pair skater
- Alina Vedmid (1940–2008), Ukrainian agronomist and politician
- Alina Voronkova, Finnish model
- Alina Zagitova (born 2002), Russian figure skater
- Alina Zmushka (born 1997), Belarusian swimmer
- Alina Zotea (born 1986), Moldovan economist, model and politician

== Fictional characters ==
- Alina Pop, character from the British soap opera Coronation Street
- Alina Starkov, main character from Leigh Bardugo's Shadow and Bone series (and its adaptation)
- Alina Gray, main villain from the role-playing video game Magia Record
- Councillor Alina, character from the Keeper series written by Shannon Messenger

== Other uses ==
- Alina people, mentioned in the Rigveda

== See also ==
- Aline (disambiguation)
- Alena (disambiguation)
- Aleena (disambiguation)
