= Alina (disambiguation) =

Alina is a female given name of Greek origin.

Alina may also refer to:

- Alina (film), a 1950 Italian drama film
- Alina (fungus), a genus of fungi in the family Alinaceae
- Alina (malware), a malware family targeting point-of-sale systems
- Alina (moth), a genus of moths in the subfamily Lymantriinae
- Alina (novel), a 2006 novel by Jason Johnson
- Alina people, a people mentioned in the Rigveda
- Alina, a Girl with a Jug, a 1936 bronze statue by Henryk Kuna

== See also ==
- ALINA, a lunar landing vehicle
- Alena (disambiguation)
- Alene (disambiguation)
