= Chytil =

Chytil (feminine: Chytilová) is a Czech surname, meaning '[he] caught'. Notable people with this surname include:

- Filip Chytil (born 1999), Czech ice hockey player
- Lenka Chytilová (born 1952), Czech poet and translator
- Miriam Chytilová (born 1965), Czech actress and singer
- Mojmír Chytil (born 1999), Czech footballer
- Věra Chytilová (1929–2014), Czech film director
