= Alene =

Alene may refer to:

== Places ==
- Alène, a river in Burgundy, France

== People ==
- Alene S. Ammond (1933–2019), American politician
- Alene Duerk (1920–2018), American United States Navy admiral
- Alene Holt (1908–1987) Canadian politician
- Alene Lee (1931–1991), member of Beat Generation
- Alene Robertson, American musical theatre actress
- Alene Word (1906–1990) American politician

== See also ==
- Coeur d'Alene (disambiguation)
- Allene (given name)
