= Alyona =

Alyona (Russian: Алёна) or Aliona is a Russian female given name derived from the Ancient Greek name Ἑλένη, Helenē (dialectal variant: Ἑλένα, Helena). See "Helen" for its history. For a long time it was considered to be a colloquial variant of the name Elena . During the Soviet times people had difficulties to officially register the name Alyona, with bureaucrats referring to the dictionaries that stated that "Alyona" is a variant of "Elena". In modern times it is no longer a problem in Russia, keeping in mind that legally Elena and Alyona are considered to be different names.

Notable people with the name include:

- Alyona Alekhina (born 1988), Russian-American snowboarder
- Alyona Alyona (born 1991), Ukrainian rapper
- Alyona Apina (born 1964), Soviet/Russian singer
- Aliona Babak (born 1969), Ukrainian politician
- Alyona Babenko (born 1972), Russian actress
- Aliona Bolsova (born 1997), Spanish-Moldovan tennis player
- Aliona Doletskaya (born 1955), Russian journalist
- Aliona Dubitskaya (born 1990), Belarusian shot putter
- Alyona Khmelnitskaya (born 1971), Russian actress
- Alyona Khomich (born 1981), Russian ice hockey player
- Alyona Lanskaya (born 1985), Belarusian singer
- Alyona Mikhaylova (born 1995), Russian actress
- Alyona Minkovski (born 1986), Russian-American journalist
- Aliona Moon (born 1989), Moldovan singer
- Alyona Osmanova (born 1988), Ukrainian model
- Alyona Petrovskaya (born 1981), Russian singer
- Alyona Polunina (born 1975), Russian filmmaker
- Alyona Rassohyna (born 1990), Ukrainian mixed martial artist
- Aljona Savchenko (born 1984), Ukrainian-born German pair skater
- Alyona Shamotina (born 1995), Ukrainian hammer thrower
- Alyona Shchennikova (born 2001), American gymnast
- Alyona Starovoitova (born 1999), Russian ice hockey player
- Alyona Subbotina (born 1990), Kazakhstani model
- Alyona Torganova (born 1980), Russian singer
- Aliona Vilani (born 1984), Russian-Kazakh dancer

== Fictional characters ==
- Alyona Ivanovna, character in Crime and Punishment by Fyodor Dostoevsky

== See also ==
- Alena
- Olena
