= Lenca (disambiguation) =

Lenca may refer to:

- Lenca people, an Indigenous people and their historical culture of western Honduras and El Salvador
- Lenca language, Indigenous language(s) of the Lenca
- C.D. Lenca, a Honduran soccer player
- Cephalotes lenca, a species of arboreal ant of the genus Cephalotes

== See also ==
- Lenka (disambiguation)
