= Lenka (disambiguation) =

Lenka is a singer-songwriter from Australia of Czech descent.

Lenka may also refer to:

- Lenka (given name), feminine given name
- Lenka (album) the 2008 self-titled album by Lenka
- Lenka, Slovakia, village in Slovakia situated on the border with Hungary
- Lenka (wasp), a wasp genus in the subfamily Pteromalinae
- the former German name of the Silesian town Łęka Opatowska, in southwestern Poland

== See also ==
- Lenca (disambiguation)
- Lanka (disambiguation)
