= 1834 =

1834 in various calendars
- Gregorian calendar: 1834; MDCCCXXXIV
- Ab urbe condita: 2587
- Armenian calendar: 1283; ԹՎ ՌՄՁԳ
- Assyrian calendar: 6584
- Balinese saka calendar: 1755–1756
- Bengali calendar: 1240–1241
- Berber calendar: 2784
- British Regnal year: 4 Will. 4 – 5 Will. 4
- Buddhist calendar: 2378
- Burmese calendar: 1196
- Byzantine calendar: 7342–7343
- Chinese calendar: 癸巳年 (Water Snake); 4531 or 4324 — to — 甲午年 (Wood Horse); 4532 or 4325
- Coptic calendar: 1550–1551
- Discordian calendar: 3000
- Ethiopian calendar: 1826–1827
- Hebrew calendar: 5594–5595
- Hindu calendars
- Vikram Samvat: 1890–1891
- Shaka Samvat: 1755–1756
- Kali Yuga: 4934–4935
- Holocene calendar: 11834
- Igbo calendar: 834–835
- Iranian calendar: 1212–1213
- Islamic calendar: 1249–1250
- Japanese calendar: Tenpō 5 (天保５年)
- Javanese calendar: 1761–1762
- Julian calendar: Gregorian minus 12 days
- Korean calendar: 4167
- Minguo calendar: 78 before ROC 民前78年
- Nanakshahi calendar: 366
- Thai solar calendar: 2376–2377
- Tibetan calendar: ཆུ་མོ་སྦྲུལ་ལོ་ (female Water-Snake); 1960 or 1579 or 807 — to — ཤིང་ཕོ་རྟ་ལོ་ (male Wood-Horse); 1961 or 1580 or 808

January 1: The Zollverein abolishes customs charges at the borders between its member states, beginning the process of German Unification.

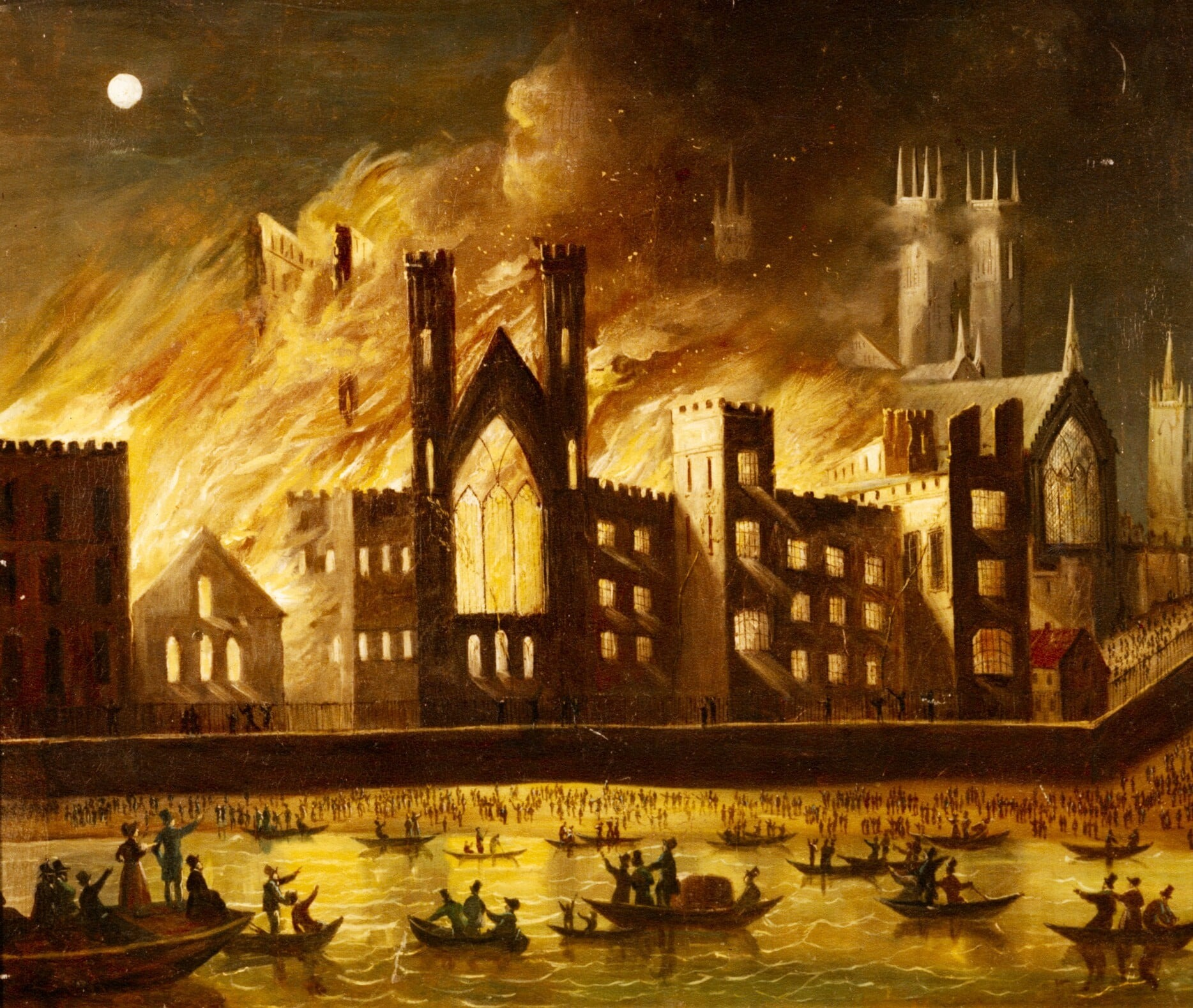
October 16: Both houses of the British Parliament are destroyed by a fire at Westminster.

1834 (MDCCCXXXIV) was a common year starting on Wednesday of the Gregorian calendar and a common year starting on Monday of the Julian calendar, the 1834th year of the Common Era (CE) and Anno Domini (AD) designations, the 834th year of the 2nd millennium, the 34th year of the 19th century, and the 5th year of the 1830s decade. As of the start of 1834, the Gregorian calendar was 12 days ahead of the Julian calendar, which remained in localized use until 1923.

== Events ==
=== January–March ===
- January 1 – Zollverein (Germany): Customs charges are abolished at borders within its member states.
- January 3 – The government of Mexico imprisons Stephen F. Austin in Mexico City.
- January – The Wilmington and Raleigh Railroad is chartered in Wilmington, North Carolina.
- February 3 – Wake Forest University is founded as the Wake Forest Manual Labor Institute in Wake Forest, North Carolina.
- February 12 – Freed American slaves from Maryland form a settlement in Cape Palmas, it is named the Republic of Maryland.
- February 13 – Robert Owen organizes the Grand National Consolidated Trades Union in the United Kingdom.
- March 6 – York, Upper Canada, is incorporated as Toronto.
- March 11 – The United States Survey of the Coast is transferred to the Department of the Navy.
- March 14 – John Herschel discovers the open cluster of stars now known as NGC 3603, observing from the Cape of Good Hope.
- March 28 – Andrew Jackson is censured by the United States Congress (expunged in 1837).
- March – John Scott Russell's Scottish Steam Carriage Company begins operating a regular passenger service in west central Scotland on the open road between Glasgow and Paisley, Renfrewshire.

=== April–June ===
- April 10 – The LaLaurie mansion in New Orleans burns, and Madame Marie Delphine LaLaurie flees to France.
- April 14 – The Whig Party is officially named by United States Senator Henry Clay.
- April 22 – Spain, France, Portugal and the United Kingdom sign the Quadruple Alliance.
- May 9 – The founder of the Second Saudi State, Imam Turki bin Abdullah Al Saud, is assassinated after the Friday prayers by Ibrahim Hamza, following the orders of his cousin Mishari.
- May 19 – The Peasants' Revolt in Egyptian-ruled Palestine begins; it is suppressed in August.
- June 7 – Greek independence: General Theodoros Kolokotronis is sentenced to death for treason, for resisting the rule of Otto of Greece (he is released the following year).
- June 21 – American inventor and businessman Cyrus McCormick is granted a patent for his mechanical reaper.

=== July–September ===
- July 7–10 – Anti-abolitionist riots break out in New York City.
- July 8 – Imam Faisal bin Turki enters Riyadh and upon entering his father's palace, assassinates his father's murderer, Ibrahim Hamza, and his master; Mishari, and becomes the ruler and founder of the Second Saudi State.
- July 15 – The Spanish Inquisition, which began in the 15th century, is suppressed by royal decree.
- July 16 – William Lamb, 2nd Viscount Melbourne, succeeds Earl Grey as Prime Minister of the United Kingdom.
- July 24 – The Liberal Wars end in Portugal.
- July 29 – The Office of Indian Affairs is organized in the United States.

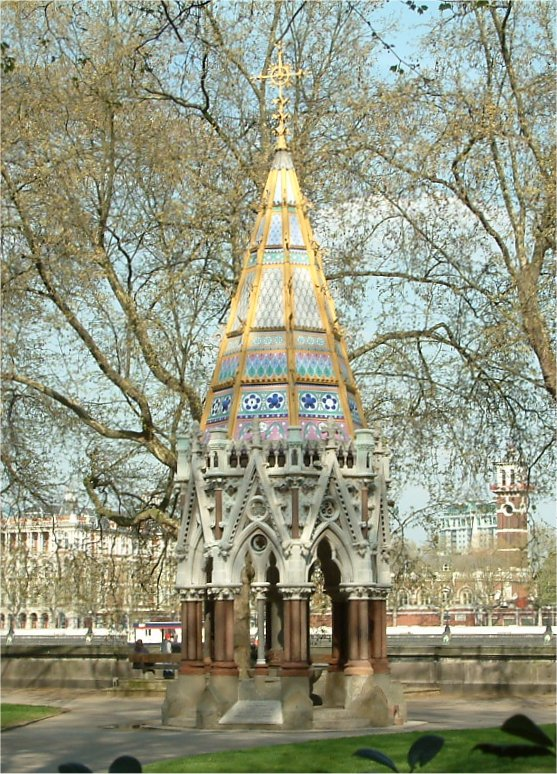
The Buxton Memorial Fountain in London, celebrating the emancipation of slaves.

- August 1
  - Slavery is abolished in the British Empire, by the Slavery Abolition Act 1833.
  - Construction work begins on the Wilberforce Monument in Kingston upon Hull, England.
- August 11–12 – Ursuline Convent riots: A convent of Ursuline nuns is burned near Boston.
- August 12 – In the Empire of Brazil, the Additional Act provides for establishment of the Provincial Legislative Assembly, extinction of the State Council, replacement of the Regency Trina, and introduction of a direct and secret ballot.
- August 14 – The Poor Law Amendment Act in the United Kingdom states that no able-bodied British man can receive assistance, unless he enters a workhouse (a kind of poorhouse).
- August 15 – The South Australia Act allows for the creation of a colony there.
- September 11 – The emigrant ship Sybelle out of Cromarty (Scotland) is wrecked off St. Paul Island (Nova Scotia) with the loss of all 316 passengers and all but six of her crew.
- September 13 – The Gleaner newspaper is first published in Jamaica.
- September 18 – Athens becomes Greece's capital city, replacing the provisional capital of Nafplio.

=== October–December ===
- October 16 – The Palace of Westminster in London is destroyed by fire, along with both the House of Commons and the House of Lords (which are not in session) of the British Parliament. An investigation later traces the disaster to an order from the Exchequer to the Board of Works to destroy the tally sticks that had been stored as part of record keeping, the use of the furnaces beneath the House of Lords to carry out the task, and the failure of authorities to stop the work or to fight the fire after smoke had first been detected, the conclusion being that the fire was "wholly attributable to carelessness and negligence."
- November 2 – The ship Atlas docks in Mauritius carrying the first group of laborers (from Calcutta) under the Indian indenture system to work on sugar plantations following the abolition of slavery in the British Empire.
- November 14 – William Lamb, 2nd Viscount Melbourne becomes the last Prime Minister of the United Kingdom to be dismissed by the British monarch. King William IV temporarily appoints Arthur Wellesley, 1st Duke of Wellington, to form a caretaker government.
- December 3 – The Zollverein institutes the first regular census in Germany. The population is 23,478,120.
- December 10 – Sir Robert Peel succeeds The Duke of Wellington as Prime Minister of the United Kingdom.
- December 11 – The Sixth Xhosa War is characterized by severe clashes between white settlers and Bantu peoples in Cape Colony; Dutch-speaking settlers colonize the area north of Orange River.

=== Date unknown ===
- The British East India Company monopoly on China trade ends. It appoints a Tea Committee to assess the potential of Assam tea.
- The Medical School of Louisiana (later Tulane University) is founded in New Orleans.
- Charles Babbage begins the conceptual design of the Analytical Engine, a mechanical forerunner of the modern computer. It will not be built in his lifetime.
- Thomas Davenport, inventor of the first American DC electrical motor, installs his motor in a small model car, creating one of the first electric cars.
- The Romanian language is banned in the schools and government facilities of the Russian Empire's Bessarabia Governorate.
- Statue of Jean-Jacques Rousseau is erected in his birthplace of Geneva.

== Births ==
=== January–June ===
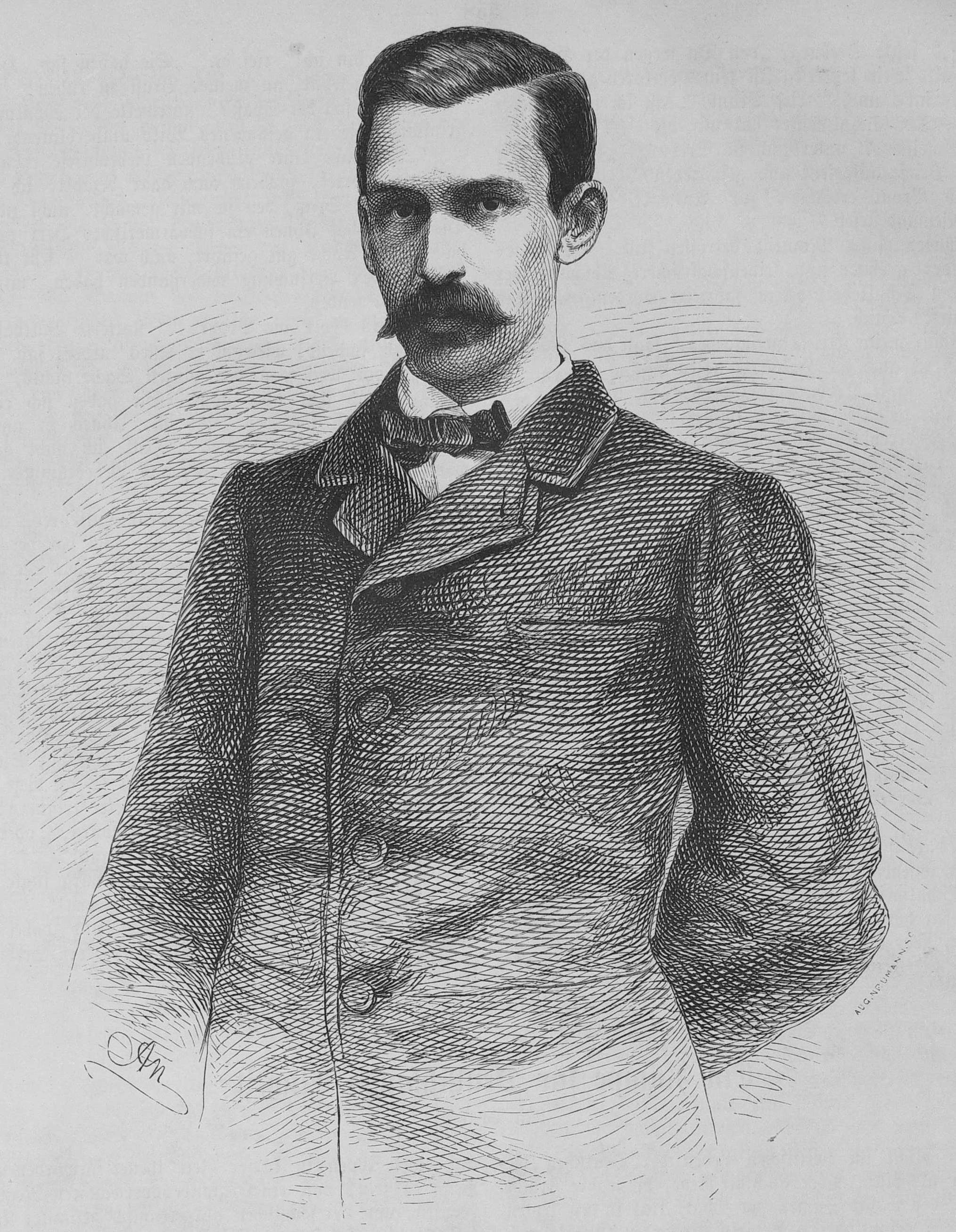
Heinrich von Treitschke

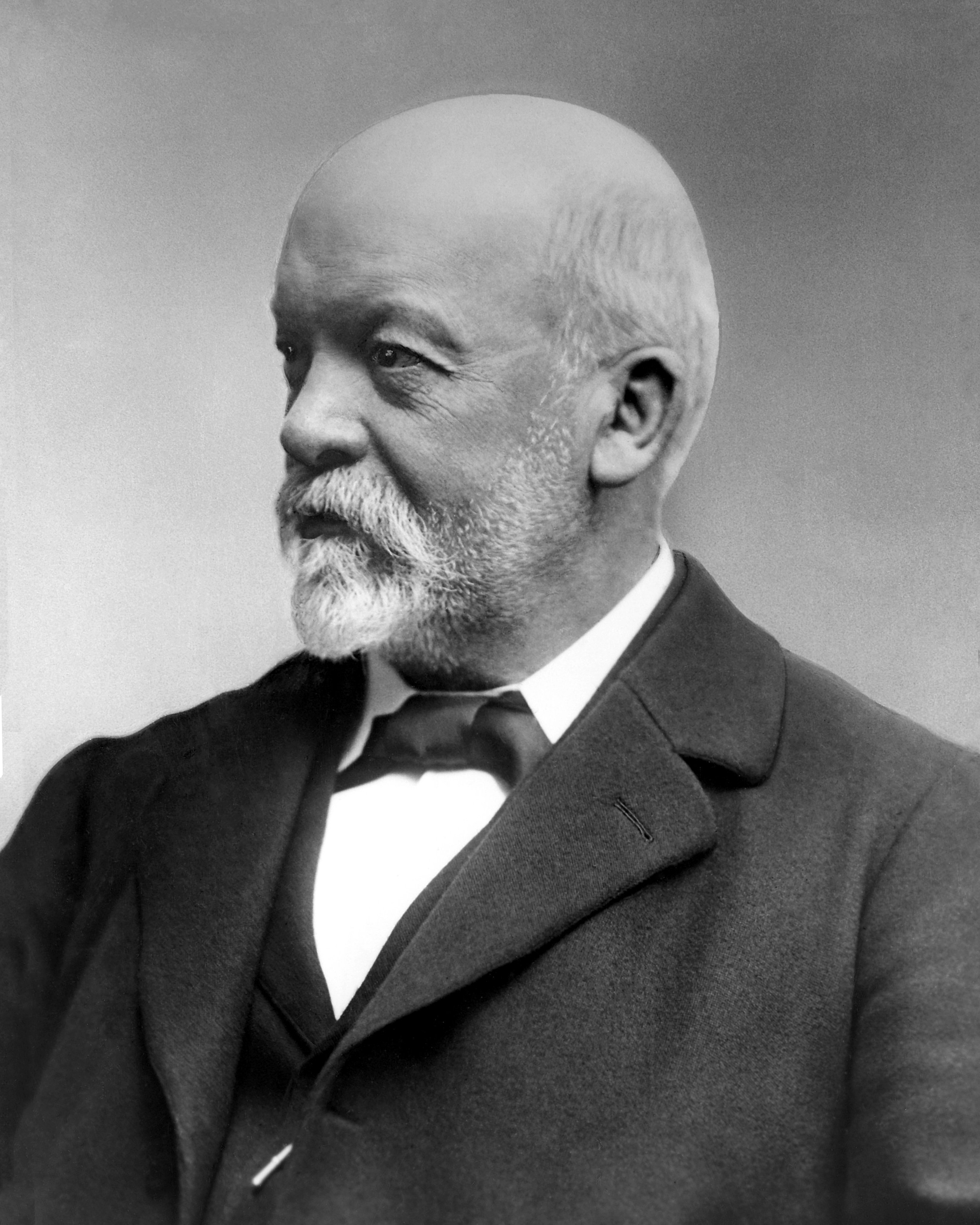
Gottlieb Daimler.

- January 7 – Johann Philipp Reis, German physicist, inventor (d. 1874)
- January 15 – Samuel Arza Davenport, American politician (d. 1911)
- January 17 – August Weismann, German evolutionary biologist (d. 1914)
- January 20 – Piet Joubert, Boer politician, military commander (d. 1900)
- January 25 – Alina Frasa, Finnish ballerina (d. 1899)
- February 6 – Edwin Klebs, German-Swiss pathologist who discovered Diphtheria (d. 1913)
- February 8 – Dmitri Mendeleev, Russian chemist (d. 1907)
- February 9 – Felix Dahn, German author (d. 1912)
- February 16 – Ernst Haeckel, German zoologist, philosopher (d. 1919)
- February 19 – Charles Davis Lucas, British Victoria Cross recipient (d. 1914)
- February 27 – Charles C. Carpenter, American admiral (d. 1899)
- March 5 – Félix de Blochausen, 6th Prime Minister of Luxembourg (d. 1915)
- March 16 – Sir James Hector, Scottish geologist (d. 1907)
- March 17 – Gottlieb Daimler, German engineer, inventor (d. 1900)
- March 20 – Charles W. Eliot, American President of Harvard University (d. 1926)
- March 23 – Julius Reubke, German composer (d. 1858)
- March 24
  - John Wesley Powell, American explorer (d. 1902)
  - William Morris, English poet, artist (d. 1896)
- April 2 – Paškal Buconjić, Herzegovinian Catholic bishop (d. 1910)
- April 26 – Artemus Ward, American humorist (d. 1867)
- May 20 – Albert Niemann, German chemist (d. 1861)
- May 23 – Carl Heinrich Bloch, Danish sculptor (d. 1890)
- June 19 – Charles Spurgeon, English Baptist preacher (d. 1892)

=== July–December ===
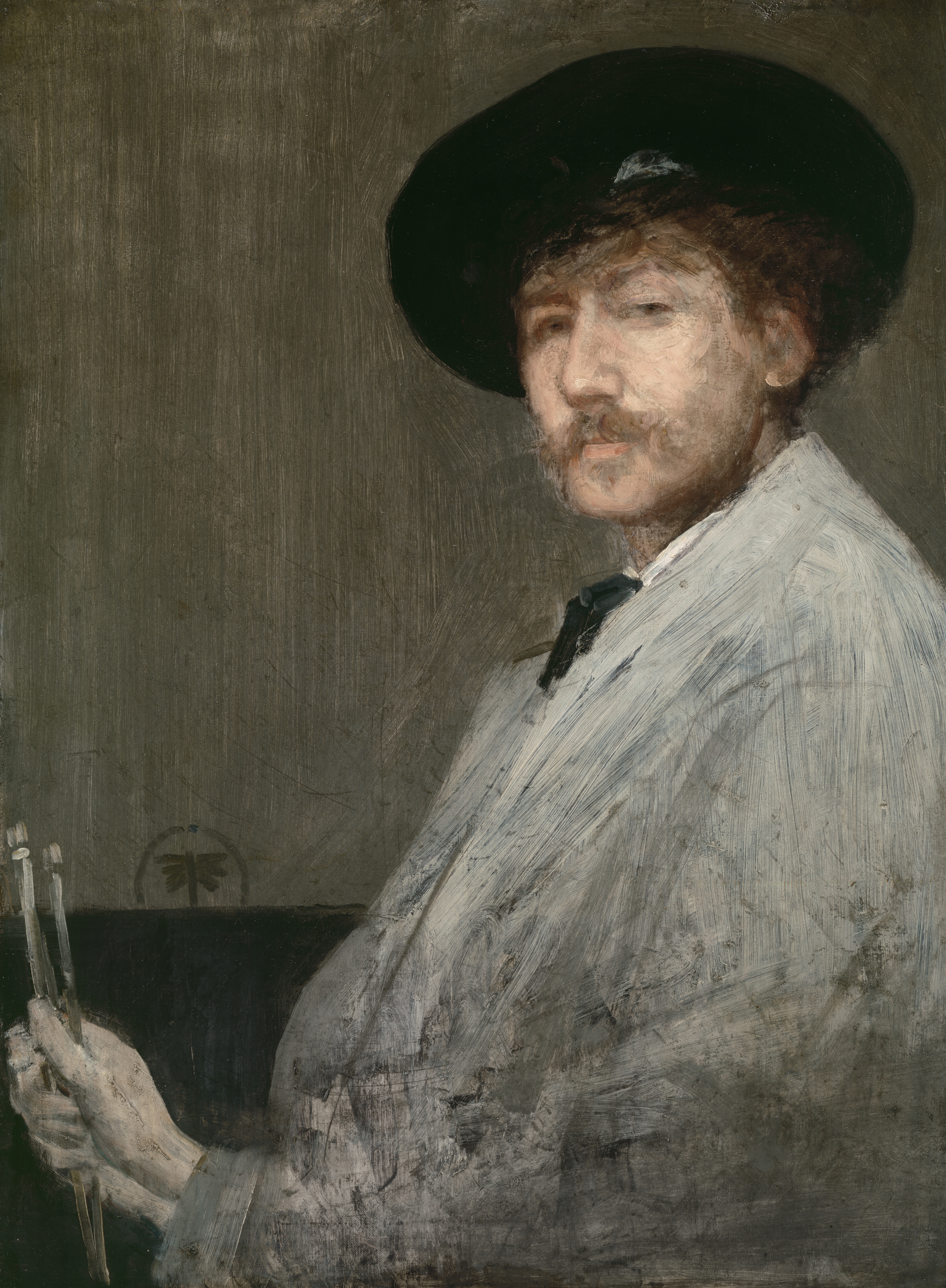
James McNeill Whistler

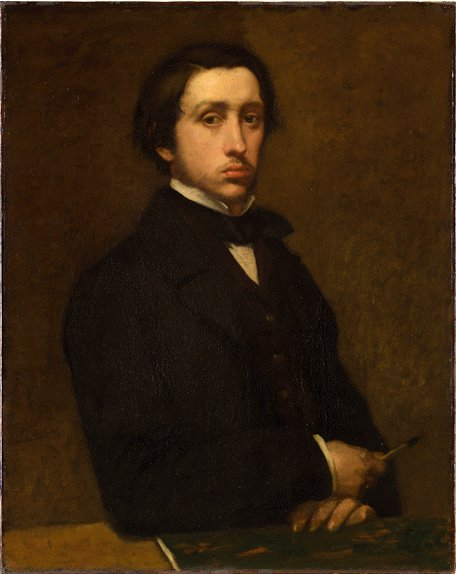
Edgar Degas

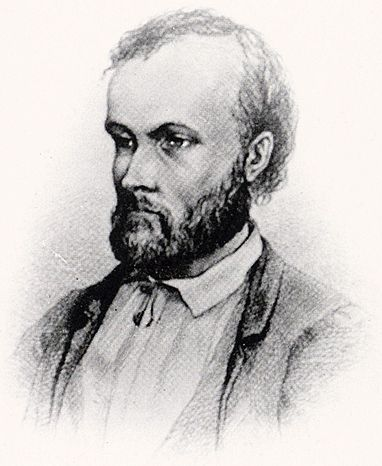
Aleksis Kivi

- July 2 – Hendrick Peter Godfried Quack, Dutch economist, historian (d. 1917)
- July 4 – Christopher Dresser, British designer influential in the Anglo-Japanese style (d. 1904)
- July 10 – James McNeill Whistler, American painter, etcher (d. 1903)
- July 19 – Edgar Degas, French painter (d. 1917)
- July 2 – Frédéric Auguste Bartholdi, French sculptor (d. 1904)
- July 27 – Miguel Grau Seminario, Peruvian admiral (d. 1879)
- August 4 – John Venn, British mathematician (d. 1923)
- August 22 – Samuel Pierpont Langley, American astronomer, physicist, and aeronautics pioneer (d. 1906)
- August 31 – Amilcare Ponchielli, Italian composer (d. 1886)
- Heinrich von Treitschke (15 September 1834 – 28 April 1896) German historian, political writer, and National Liberal member of the Reichstag during the time of the German Empire.
- September 17 – Robert Simpson, Scottish-Canadian businessman (d. 1897)
- September 28 – William Montrose Graham Jr., American general (d. 1916)
- September 30 – Louis P. Mouillard, French artist, aviation pioneer (d. 1897)
- October 6 – Walter Kittredge, American composer (d. 1905)
- October 10 – Aleksis Kivi, Finnish national author (d. 1872)
- November 8 – Johann Karl Friedrich Zöllner, German astrophysicist (d. 1882)
- November 13 – Ignacio Manuel Altamirano, Mexican writer (d. 1893)
- November 19 – Georg Hermann Quincke, German physicist (d. 1924)
- November 21 – Hetty Green, American businesswoman (d. 1916)
- November 28 – Sophronia Farrington Naylor Grubb, American activist (d. 1902)
- December 16 – Léon Walras, French economist (d. 1910)
- December 24 – Augustus George Vernon Harcourt, English chemist (d. 1919)

=== Date unknown ===
- Joseph Welland, Irish missionary and Reverend (d. 1879)

== Deaths ==
=== January–June ===
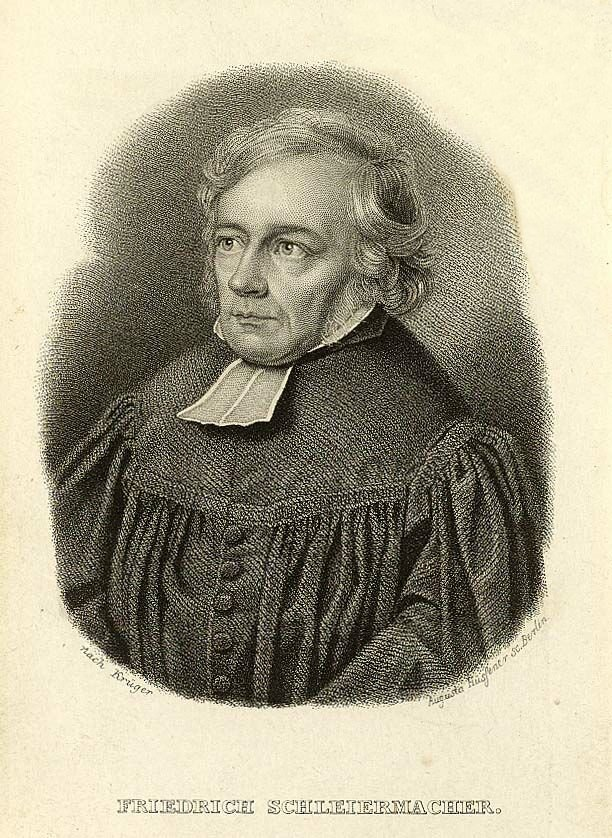
Friedrich Schleiermacher

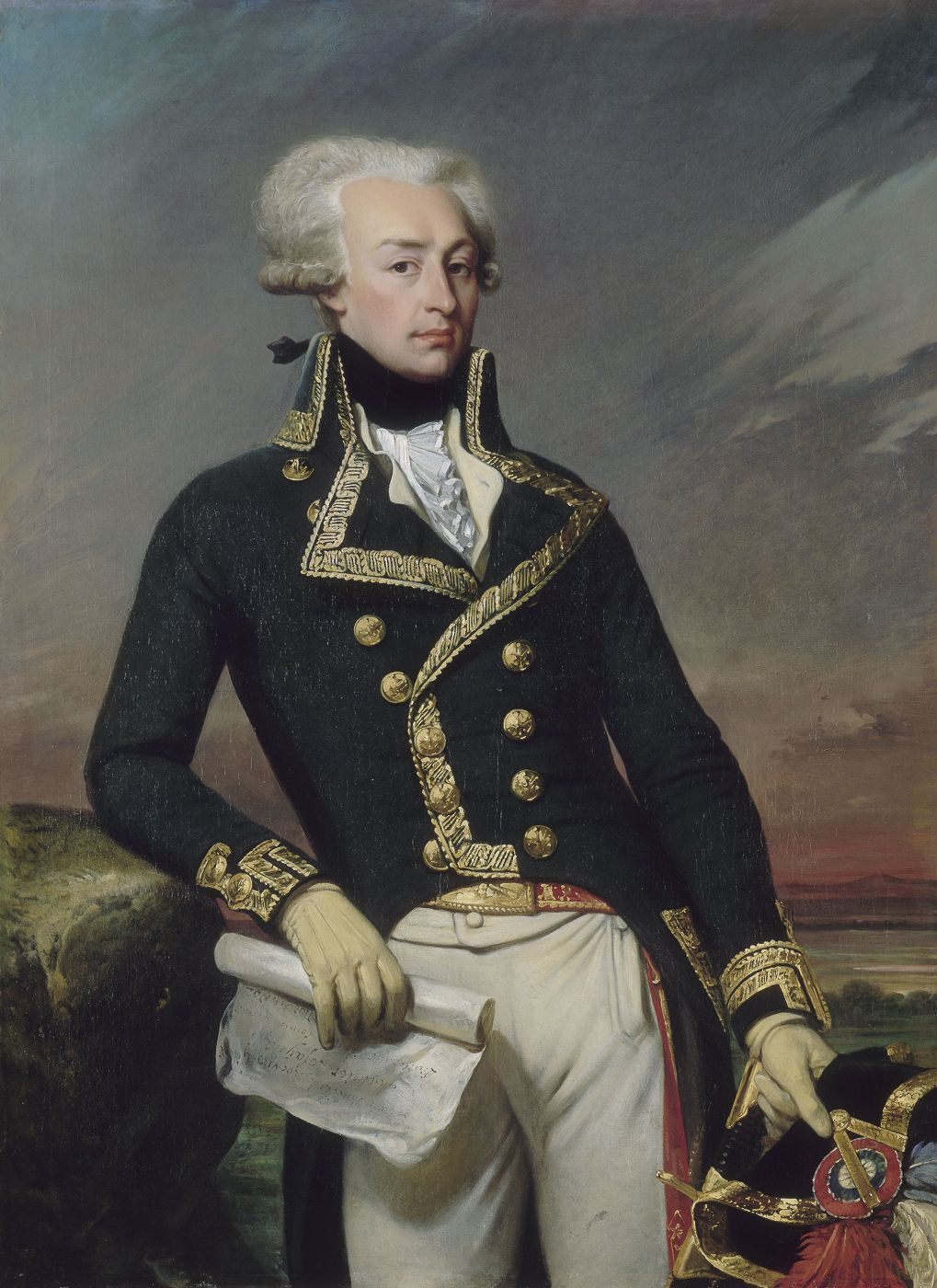
Gilbert du Motier

- January 6 – Richard Martin, Irish founder of the Society for the Prevention of Cruelty to Animals (b. 1754)
- January 12 – William Grenville, 1st Baron Grenville, Prime Minister of the United Kingdom (b. 1759)
- January 17 – Giovanni Aldini, Italian physicist (b. 1762)
- February 2 – Lorenzo Dow, American minister (b. 1777)
- February 4 – Amélie-Julie Candeille, French composer, librettist, writer, singer, actress, comedian, and instrumentalist (b. 1767)
- February 12 – Friedrich Schleiermacher, German theologian and philosopher (b. 1768)
- February 18 – William Wirt, 9th United States Attorney General (b. 1772)
- February 23 – Karl Ludwig von Knebel, German poet (b. 1744)
- March 2 – José Cecilio del Valle, first President of Central America (b. 1780)
- March 30 – Rudolph Ackermann, Anglo-German entrepreneur (b. 1764)
- April 5 – Vice-Admiral Sir Richard Goodwin Keats, Governor of Newfoundland (b. 1757)
- April 10 – John 'Merino' MacArthur, Australian farmer (b. 1767)
- April 11 – John 'Mad Jack' Fuller, English philanthropist, patron of the arts and sciences (b. 1757)
- April 29 – Grigore IV Ghica, prince of Wallachia (b. 1755)
- May 9 – Turki bin Abdullah bin Muhammad, founder of the First Saudi State
- May 20 – Gilbert du Motier, Marquis de Lafayette, French nobleman, soldier (b. 1757)
- May 31 – Shaikh Khalifa bin Salman bin Ahmed Al Khalifa, Deputy Ruler of Bahrain (b. c. 1783)

=== July–December ===
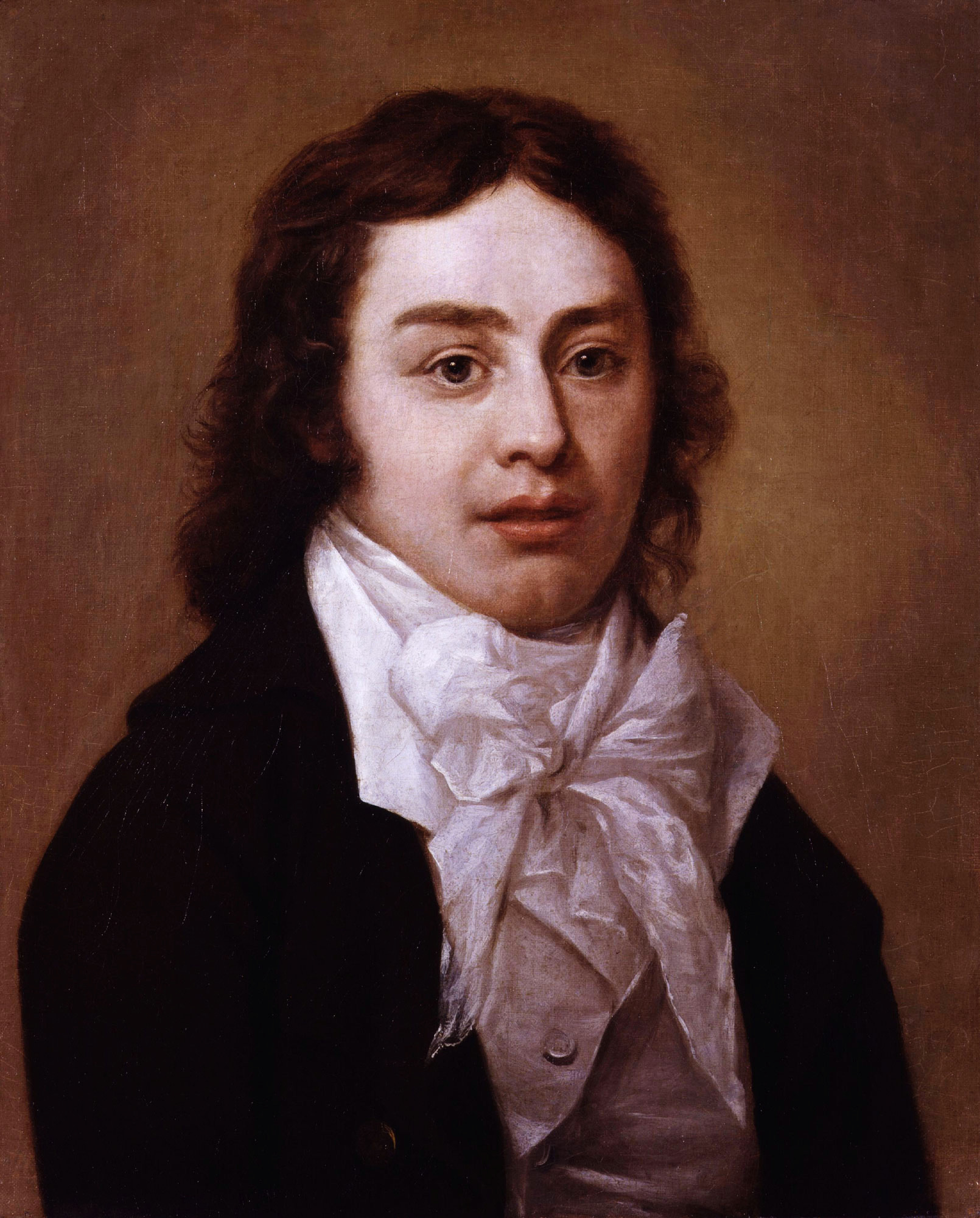
Samuel Taylor Coleridge

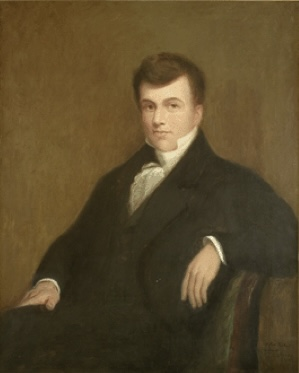
Jonathan Jennings

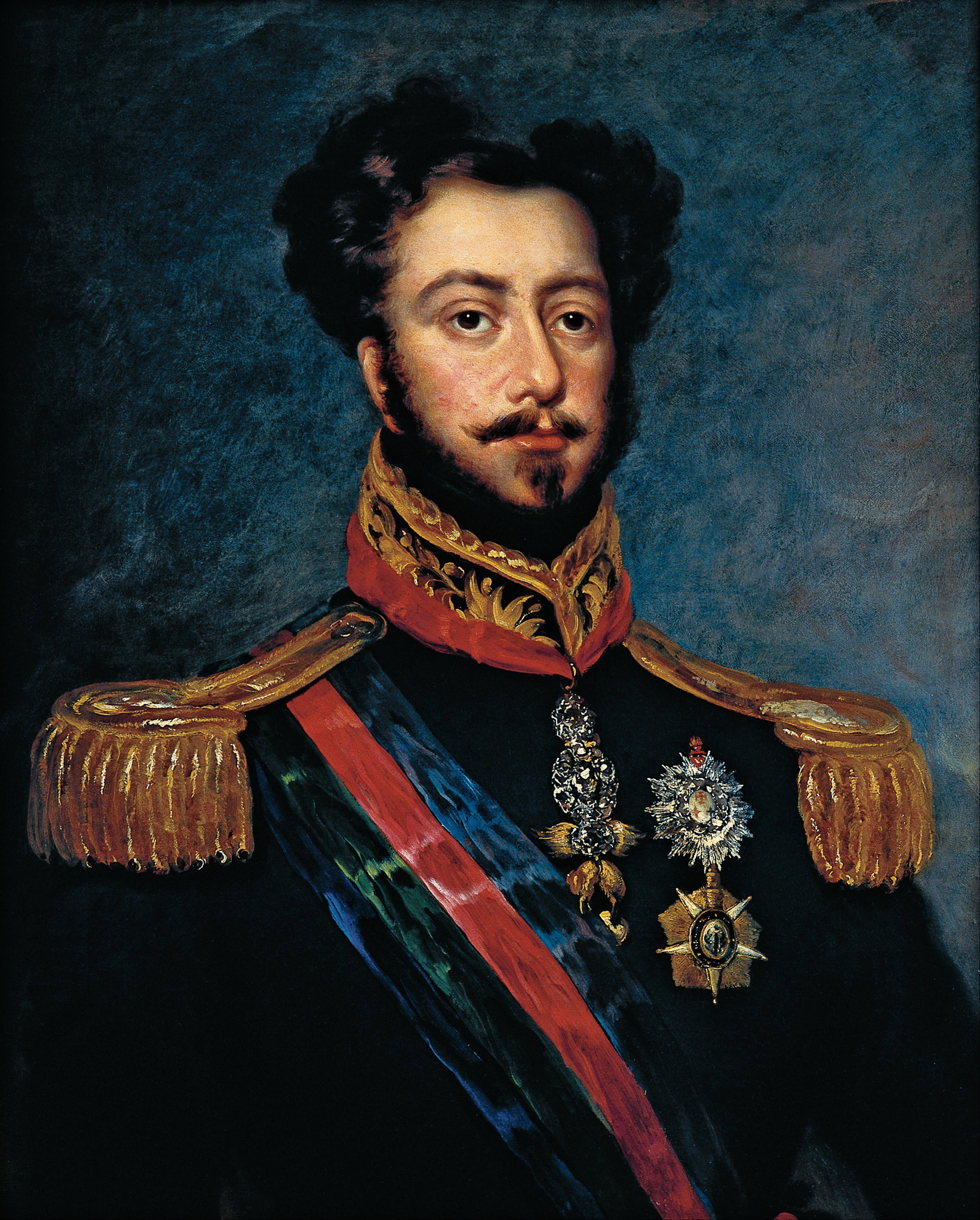
Pedro I of Brazil

- July 12 – David Douglas, Scottish botanist (b. 1799)
- July 14 – Edmond-Charles Genêt, French ambassador to the United States during the French Revolution (b. 1763)
- July 19 – Károly Hadaly, Hungarian mathematician (b. 1743)
- July 25 – Samuel Taylor Coleridge, English writer (b. 1772)
- July 26 – Jonathan Jennings, American politician and the first governor of Indiana (b. 1784)
- August 1 – Robert Morrison, British Protestant missionary to China (b. 1782)
- August 7 – Joseph Marie Jacquard, French inventor (b. 1752)
- August 17 – Husein Gradaščević, Bosnian rebel leader (b. 1802)
- September 2 – Thomas Telford, Scottish engineer (b. 1757)
- September 5 – Thomas Lee, English architect (b. 1794)
- September 9 – James Weddell, Antarctic explorer (b. 1787)
- September 15 – William H. Crawford, American politician, judge (b. 1772)
- September 16 – William Blackwood, Scottish writer (b. 1776)
- September 24 – Emperor Pedro I of Brazil (b. 1798)
- October 5 – María Josefa Pimentel, Duchess of Osuna (b. 1752)
- October 8 – François-Adrien Boieldieu, French composer (b. 1775)
- October 11 – William Napier, 9th Lord Napier, British Navy officer, politician and diplomat (b. 1786)
- October 21 – Edward Smith-Stanley, 12th Earl of Derby (b. 1752)
- October 23 – Fath Ali Shah Qajar, King of Iran (b. 1772)
- October 31 – Éleuthère Irénée du Pont, French-American chemical manufacturer (b. 1771)
- November 2 – Maria Teresa Poniatowska, Polish aristocrat (b. 1760)
- November 27 – Rosalie de Constant, Swiss naturalist (b. 1758)
- December 23 – Thomas Malthus, English economist, political philosopher (b. 1766)
- December 27 – Charles Lamb, English essayist (b. 1775)
- December 31 – João Batista Gonçalves Campos, intellectual leader of the Cabanagem revolt (b. 1782)
