= Lenka (given name) =

Lenka is a Czech, Slovak and Serbian feminine given name. It is also a diminutive of other female names, Lena, Elena, and variants. Notable people with the name include:

== Arts and entertainment ==
- Lenka (born 1978), Australian singer-songwriter and actress
- Lenka Chytilová (born 1952), Czech poet and translator
- Lenka Clayton (born 1977), British-American conceptual artist
- Lenka Dolanská Vlasáková (born 1972), Czech actress
- Lenka Dusilová (born 1975), Czech singer-songwriter
- Lenka Filipová, known as Lenny (singer) (born 1993), Czech singer-songwriter
- Lenka Krobotová (born 1977), Czech actress
- Lenka Lichtenberg (born 1955), Canadian singer, composer and songwriter
- Lenka Matějáková (born 1986), Czech violinist
- Lenka Peterson (1925–2021), American actress
- Lenka Pichlíková-Burke (born 1954), Czech-American actress
- Lenka Procházková (born 1951), Czech writer
- Lenka Reinerová (1916–2008), Czech writer
- Lenka Vlasáková (born 1972), Czech actress

== Sports ==
- Lenka Bartáková (born 1991), Czech basketball player
- Lenka Cenková (born 1977), Czech tennis player
- Lenka Dlhopolcová (born 1984), Slovak tennis player
- Lenka Dürr (born 1990), German volleyball player
- Lenka Gazdíková (born 1986), Slovak footballer
- Lenka Háječková (born 1978), Czech beach volleyball player
- Lenka Hiklová (born 1980), Slovak ski mountaineer
- Lenka Ilavská (born 1972), Slovak road racing cyclist
- Lenka Juríková (born 1990), Slovak tennis player
- Lenka Kebrlová (born 1966), Czech alpine skier
- Lenka Kulovaná (born 1974), Czech figure skater
- Lenka Kunčíková (born 1995), Czech tennis player
- Lenka Kuncová (born 1971), Czech paralympic archer
- Lenka Ledvinová (born 1985), Czech hammer thrower
- Lenka Maňhalová (born 1974), Czech swimmer
- Lenka Marušková (born 1985), Czech sport shooter
- Lenka Masná (born 1985), Czech runner
- Lenka Němečková (born 1976), Czech tennis player
- Lenka Ptáčníková (born 1976), Czech-born Icelandic chess player
- Lenka Radová (born 1979), Czech triathlete
- Lenka Serdar (born 1997), Czech-American ice hockey player
- Lenka Šmídová (born 1975), Czech sailor
- Lenka Tvarošková (born 1982), Slovak tennis player
- Lenka Vymazalová (born 1959), Czech field hockey player
- Lenka Wech (born 1976), German rower
- Lenka Wienerová (born 1988), Slovak tennis player

== Other ==
- Lenka Bradáčová (born 1973), Czech public prosecutor
- Lenka Çuko (born 1938), Albanian politician
- Lenka Franulic (1908–1961), Chilean journalist
- Lenka Hlávková (1974–2023), Czech musicologist
- Lenka Kotková (born 1973), Czech astronomer
- Lenka Zdeborová (born 1980), Czech physicist and computer scientist

== See also ==
- Lenka (disambiguation)
