= Mambetov =

Mambetov (masculine, Russian: Мамбетов) or Mambetova (feminine, Russian: Мамбетова) is a Russian surname. Notable people with the surname include:

- Asset Mambetov (born 1982), Kazakh wrestler
- Evelina Mambetova (born 1991), Ukrainian model
