= Alyona Osmanova =

Ukrainian model

- Born: Альона Османова; March 31, 1988 (age 37); Ukrainian SSR
- Occupation: Model
- Years active: 2006–present
- Modeling information
- Height: 5 ft 11 in / 180 cm
- Hair color: Light brown
- Eye color: Blue
- Agency: Girls Girls (Ukraine), Blow (France)

Alyona Osmanova (Russian: Алёна Османова; Ukrainian: Альона Османова; born March 31, 1988) is a Ukrainian model.

== Career ==
=== Beginning ===
Osmanova's first major fashion credit was for V magazine in 2006. Osmanova made her catwalk debut in the Spring 2007 season, walking for top designers Marc Jacobs, Vera Wang, Prada, Miu Miu, Chanel and Givenchy. In December 2006, she appeared in both Teen Vogue and its Korean equivalent.

=== 2007 ===
Osmanova was photographed by Xevi Muntane for the February issue of Dazed and Confused. In the Fall 2007 season, she walked for Jonathan Saunders, John Galliano and Max Mara.

In March, Osmanova appeared in the March editions of both Vogue Russia and V, the latter of which contained a controversial shot in which Osmanova kisses Rachel Alexander.

In July, she was shot by Sølve Sundsbø for Harper’s Bazaar. Osmanova appeared in the August issue of Vogue. In September, she landed a Marc Jacobs campaign shot by Juergen Teller and the cover of Oprah. She appeared in the October issues of both Dazed and Confused and T Style, the fashion supplement of the New York Times.

=== 2008 ===
In 2008, Osmanova walked for designers such as Donna Karan, Alexander McQueen, Proenza Schouler, Christian Lacroix, Viktor & Rolf and Tibi. She shot alongside Tanya Dziahileva and Hyoni Kang for Lacoste, as well a solo campaign for Donna Karan, and appeared in various magazines throughout the year including Harper’s Bazaar, Vogue Germany, Numéro, 10, Flair and Tush. This same year, Osmanova replaced Inguna Butane as the face of Bottega Veneta.

=== 2009 onwards ===
After four years at Supreme, Osmanova signed a contract with Ford Models. In 2009, she walked for Carolina Herrera and Jason Wu, and appeared in the March editions of Dazed & Confused, Elle Italy, and Vogue Italia.

For a period of time, Osmanova moved into plus-size modelling, switching to Ford Models’ Plus division.

Osmanova moved back into editorial modelling after losing weight, signing a contract with Women Management in 2013. In February of the same year she made a return to the catwalk at the Giorgio Armani show.

== Personal life ==
Osmanova is close friends with fellow models Anabela Belikova, Irina Kulikova, Alana Zimmer, Suvi Koponen, Evelina Mambetova, and Vika Kuropyatnikova, with whom she often works.
