= Woundlicker =

2005 novel by Jason Johnson

- Cover art from Blackstaff Press, 2005
- Author: Jason Johnson
- Language: English
- Subject: Espionage, Northern Ireland
- Genre: Thriller
- Published: Belfast: Blackstaff Press, 2005
- Publication place: Northern Ireland
- Media type: Book
- Pages: 165
- ISBN: 9780856407741
- OCLC: 62343891

Woundlicker is a novel by the journalist Jason Johnson, which is set in Belfast, Northern Ireland. The story takes place during the slow-moving Northern Ireland peace process talks of 2004 and is written as the verbatim transcription of a covert British government recording. Johnson said his debut novel, published in 2005, was "a story without heroes set in a city where there are far too many."

== Plot summary ==
The story is narrated by a disagreeable misfit and heavy drinker called Fletcher Fee who works in a car wash at the Stormont government building. Some days after witnessing the violent abuse of an 18-year-old called Molly Duddy, Fee finds a listening device secreted in one of the government's black Mercedes cars which he is cleaning. He begins defining his character to the device, informing it and the reader that he is the product of a violent marriage between a Catholic father and a Protestant mother. Ultimately, Fee explains, he plans to break free from the shackles of a divided society. He develops a mild obsession with Molly, whom he refers to as Wee Blondie, as well as a plan to befriend her.

During a protest, overzealous police shoot Fee's only friend, a Muslim colleague called Karim. The killing, which gets second place in a news media obsessed with Northern Ireland politics, spurs 25-year-old Fee towards a dangerous and violent form of revenge. His targets are politicians and paramilitaries from both traditions in Northern Ireland, Loyalist and Republican. The police, as well as both sides of the polarised community, are soon baffled as to who is carrying out these murders because they do not fit the traditional template of killing in Northern Ireland. After each murder, Fee returns to work and gets back into the car. There he describes what he has done and attempts to explain why he did it.

After a savage and public double-killing which follows Fee's first sexually charged meeting with Molly, he flees as the police try and fail miserably to track him down. The final chapter contains an official government response denying that it or any of its agents were aware of Fee or of his activities before his final act. It also contains a denial, aimed at a suspicious Press, insisting that the government played no part in facilitating Fee's escape. Rumours from Stormont had suggested that unscrupulous powers had viewed his attacks as a way of getting both sides to refocus on the issue at hand, by way of a common enemy. However the reader is already aware that all of Fee's words are a transcription from secret government recordings in which the protagonist is codenamed Woundlicker.

In a follow-up police operation, a letter from Fee is found in Molly's house suggesting that she join him as he begins to make a new life for himself. Molly, like Fee, is nowhere to be found.

== Reaction ==
Woundlicker, Johnson's debut novel, was well received by critics in Ireland, with the author being described by playwright Nell McCafferty as "The Irish Irvine Welsh" due to its colloquial and visceral style.

However, Belfast minister David McIlveen called for it to be reviewed, saying "We need to ban this sort of filth...As far as I can see it's done for sensational purposes and shows an inability for the author to be constructive". Johnson responded that it was "authentic and reflects life in some parts of Belfast"

Woundlicker is published by Belfast publishing house Blackstaff Press.

== Other work ==
Alina, by Jason Johnson.
