= Floreni =

- Commune and village
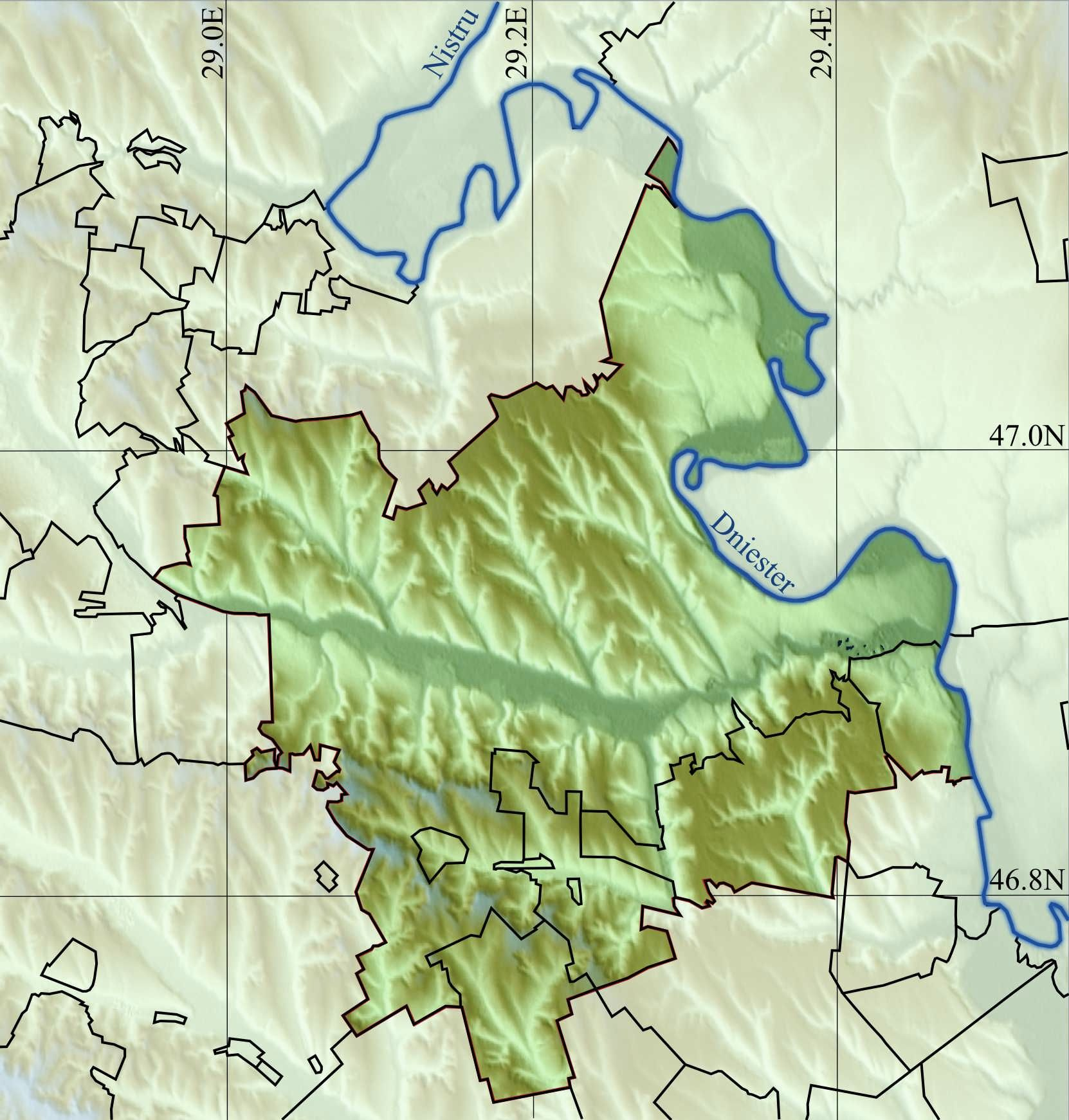
- Location within Anenii Noi District Location within Moldova
- Coordinates: 46°56′00″N 28°59′00″E
- Country: Moldova
- District: Anenii Noi District

Population (2014 census)
  - Total: 3,973
- Time zone: UTC+2 (EET)
  - Summer (DST): UTC+3 (EEST)

Floreni is a commune and village in the Anenii Noi District of Moldova.
