= Alyona Subbotina =

Kazakh model (born 1990)

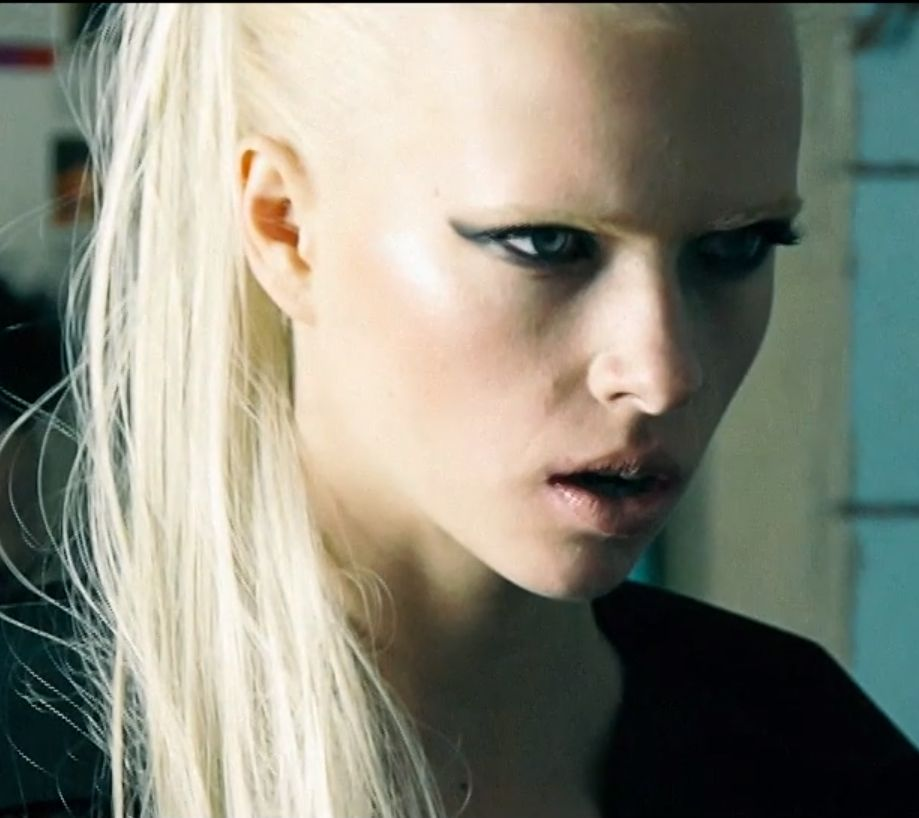
- Born: 13 February 1990 (age 36); Almaty, Kazakhstan
- Modeling information
- Height: 1.78 m (5 ft 10 in)
- Hair color: blonde
- Eye color: blue
- Agency: RED model management

Alyona Subbotina (born 13 February 1990) is a Kazakh fashion model and entrepreneur. She gained international recognition after exclusively opening the Givenchy fashion show in Paris in 2011. She has worked with designers such as Giorgio Armani, Givenchy and Helmut Lang.

== Early life ==
Subbotina was born in Almaty, Kazakhstan to Russian parents. She was a member of the Kazakh Olympic Volleyball team. She began her modeling career at the age of 16 in Singapore while concurrently completing a B.A. in Hotel Management from the East Asia Institute of Management.

== Career ==
Subbotina’s modeling career began at age 16. She was scouted by two agents to participate in Kazakhstan Fashion Week (KFW). This led to modeling work in Singapore where her awkward beauty and new ‘albino’ makeover garnered her attention and work.

She was secured exclusively by Givenchy to open Paris Fashion Week 2011. Her reception was well received and she was requested to relocate to New York City.

Subbotina has walked in fashion shows for designers including Helmut Lang, Acne Studios, Fendi, Preen, Pringle of Scotland, Rick Owens, Daks, David Koma, Givenchy, Mara Hoffman, Roksanda Illincic, Thierry Mugler, Tibi, Vivienne Westwood and Jean Paul Gaultier.

She was the face for MAC Cosmetics and Brunello Cucinelli in 2012 and Thomas Wylde in 2013. She has been the advertising campaign for Armani.

Subbotina has appeared in magazines including Vogue Italia, Vogue Germany, Interview, iD Magazine, METAL, V, Marie Claire (France, UK) and Dazed. She has graced the covers of Marie Claire (Malaysia, Ukraine), Harper’s Bazaar Kazakhstan, Elle Mexico and Numéro Thailand.
