= Lankapura =

Lankapura may refer to:

- Lankapura, the capital city of Lanka, the island fortress of the king Ravana in Hindu mythology
- Lankapura Dandanatha, a general of the army of Parakramabahu I, who led an expeditionary force to South India
- Lankapura, a city in Polonnaruwa District, North Central Province, Sri Lanka
  - Lankapura Pradeshiya Sabhawa (local government), for Lankapura and suburbs in Polonnaruwa District
  - Lankapura Divisional Secretariat, North Central Province, Sri Lanka

== See also ==
- Lanka (disambiguation)
