= Alina ochroderoea =

Scientific classification
- Kingdom: Animalia
- Phylum: Arthropoda
- Clade: Pancrustacea
- Class: Insecta
- Order: Lepidoptera
- Superfamily: Noctuoidea
- Family: Erebidae
- Genus: Alina
- Species: A. ochroderoea

Binomial name
- Alina ochroderoea (Mabille, 1898)

Synonyms
- Dasychira ochroderoea Mabille, 1898

Species of moth

Alina ochroderoea is a only species in the [[[moth]] genus Alina of the subfamily Lymantriinae. The species was first described by Paul Mabille in 1898. It is found on Madagascar.
