= Lanka (disambiguation) =

Lanka is the name given in Hindu epics to the island fortress capital of the legendary demon king Ravana.

Lanka may also refer to:

- Lanka, Assam, a town in Assam, India
- Laṅkāvatāra Sūtra, scripture in Mahāyāna Buddhism
- Sri Lanka, a country in South Asia
- Lanka (2006 film), Indian Malayalam-language crime-thriller film
- Lanka (2011 film), Indian Hindi-language drama-thriller film
- Lanka (2017 film), Indian Telugu-language film
- Stefan Lanka (Bardens vs. Lanka, Regional Court Stuttgart, 2016)

== See also ==
- Lenka (disambiguation)
- Lankapura (disambiguation)
