= Aleena =

Aleena is a female given name, possibly a variant of Alina. It may refer to:

== People ==
- Aleena Gibson (born 1968), Swedish songwriter
- Aleena Nawawi, lawn bowler from Malaysia
- Aleena Shaji, stage name Ivana (actress), Indian actress

== In fiction ==
- Queen Aleena the Hedgehog, a character from the animated series Sonic Underground; mother of Sonic the Hedgehog
- Aleena Francis from Uppum Mulakum, Indian Malayalam-language sitcom
- Aleena Peter from Ammayariyathe, 2020-2023 Indian television crime drama series
- Aleena Riaz from Lamhay, Pakistani romantic drama television series
- Aleena (Star Wars), an alien species from the Star Wars universe
- Aleena from Beau Soleil

== See also ==
- Murder of Zara Aleena
- Alena (disambiguation)
