= Alena Fink-Trauschel =

German politician (born 1999)

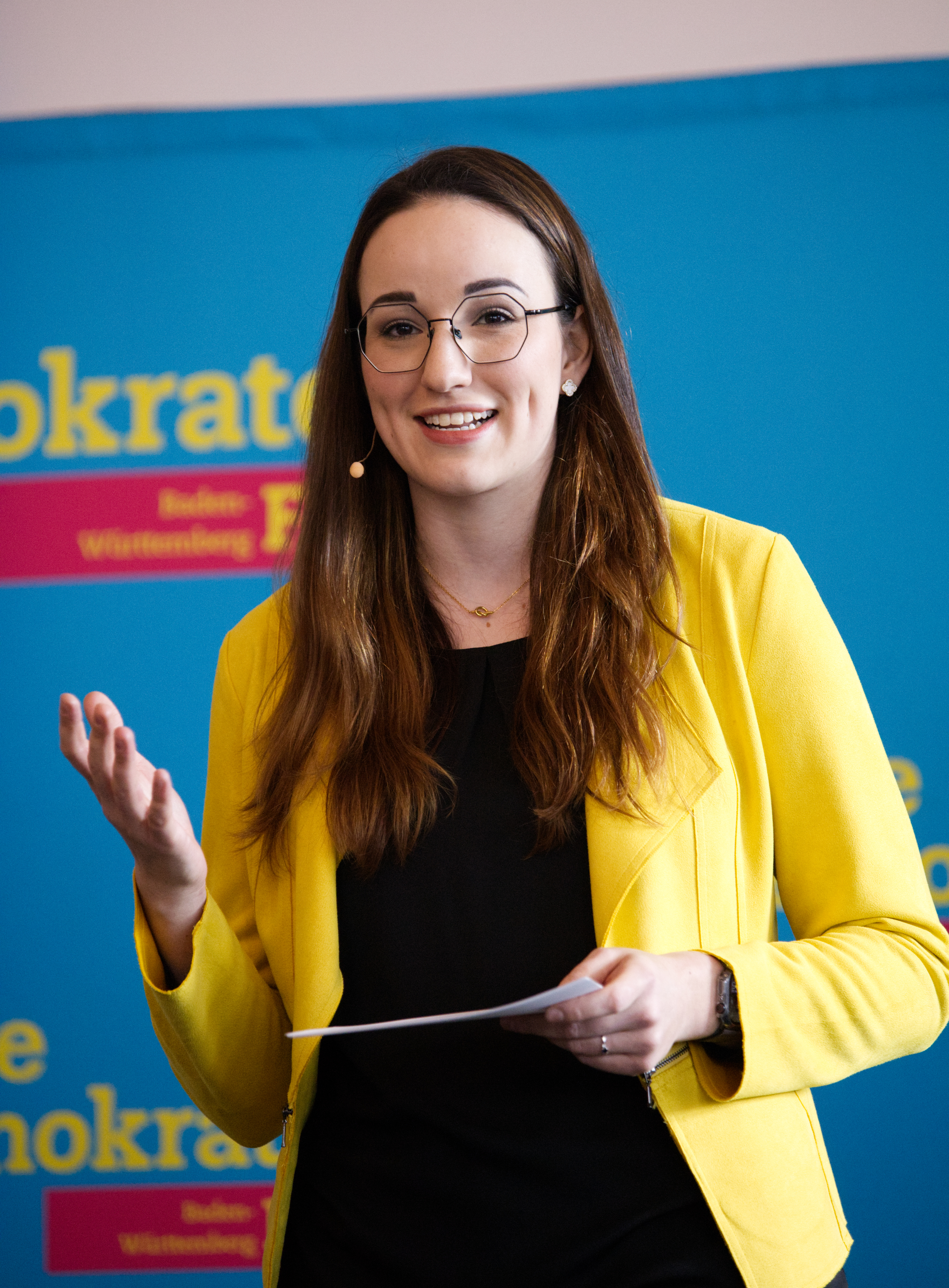
- Fink-Trauschel in 2023

Member of the Landtag of Baden-Württemberg
- Incumbent
- Assumed office 14 April 2021
- Constituency: Ettlingen

Personal details
- Born: 14 February 1999 (age 27) Bobingen
- Party: Free Democratic Party (since 2017)

Alena Fink-Trauschel (born 14 February 1999 in Bobingen) is a German politician serving as a member of the Landtag of Baden-Württemberg since 2021. She has served as chairwoman of the Free Democratic Party in Ettlingen since 2022.
