= Alena Kish =

Belarusian primitivist painter

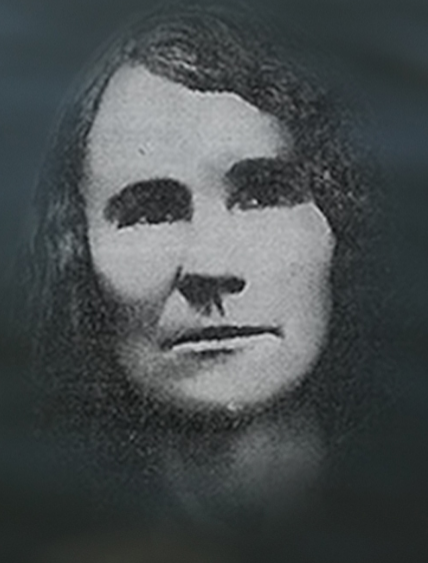
- Only known picture
- Born: c. 1889; Ramanau, Russian Empire
- Died: 1949 (aged c. 60); Slutsk, Byelorussian SSR, Soviet Union
- Occupation: artisan
- Known for: carpets

Alena Kish (Belarusian: Але́на Андрэ́еўна Кіш, c. 1889 – 1949) was a Belarusian primitivist painter from the surroundings of Slutsk.

== Life ==
Alena Kish was born around 1889 in the village of Ramanau, near Slutsk. After losing her parents during World War 2, she moved with her siblings to the settlement of Hrozau to live with her sister. As a nomadic artist, she traveled from village to village, painting in exchange for a fee, food, or shelter. During the 1930s and 1940s in Belarus, Kish created her iconic painted carpets despite the villagers’ focus on survival. While working, she often sang folk songs. She is recognized as the creator of a unique visual genre: artistically painted carpets, known globally as the traditional Belarusian Malyavanyya dyvany or Malyavanki.

After World War 2, her work gained popularity as villages were rebuilt, and homes sought new decorative elements. By the late 1940s, her painted carpets were highly valued, marking the most productive period of her life. However, as demand diminished with the arrival of manufactured goods, Kish struggled to sustain herself. In 1949, she was found drowned in a river. While it may have been an accident, some findings suggest she committed suicide due to financial hardship. Her income from handcrafted designs dwindled as manufactured goods became more widely available in the area.

She gained recognition as an artist at the end of 1970s, three decades after her death. A collection of her surviving works is preserved in the Museum of Zaslawye.

The works by Alena Kish were presented in 1999 in Moscow at the 1st International Festival "Intermuseum". The works of Alena Kish have been featured on a national postage stamp and in an exhibition in Minsk in 2013.

In 1984, Alena Kish was featured in the World Encyclopedia of Naive Art by Oto Bihalji-Merin, published in Yugoslavia. She was one of the few female artists among 800 names representing 50 countries, including renowned figures such as Henri Rousseau (France), Ivan Generalich (Croatia), Niko Pirosmani (Georgia), Katerina Bilokur (Ukraine), Maria Prymachenko (Ukraine), and others.

The works of Alena Kish have inspired numerous contemporary artists and fashion designers, including the Belarusian eco-brand Historia Naturalis. Alena Kish has been highlighted in the book "She was" by contemporary Belarusian female artists dedicated to reclaiming and celebrating the talents and achievements of women in Belarusian history.

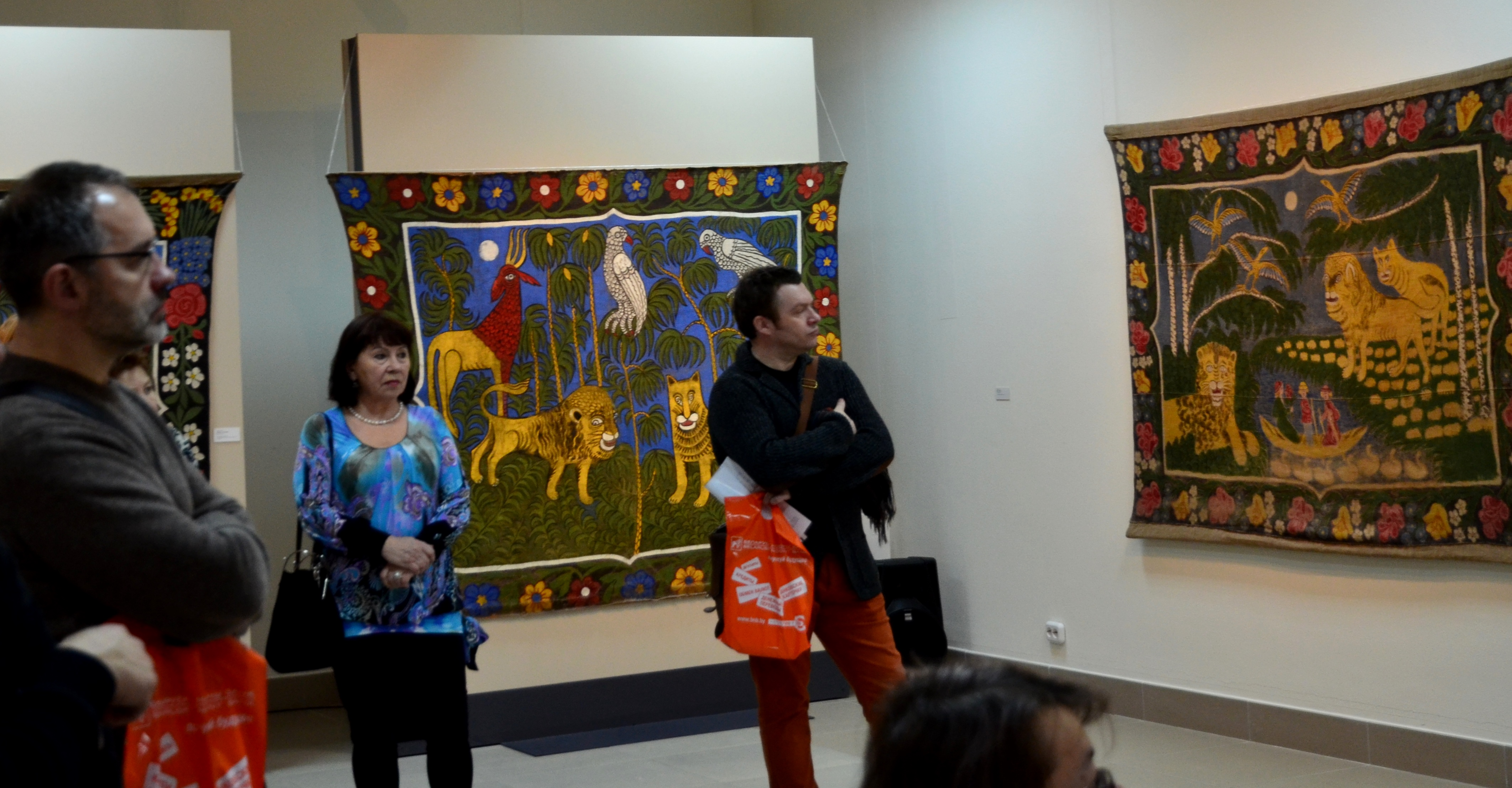
Kish's work at an exhibition in Minsk in 2013
