= Alena Analeigh Wicker =

American student

Alena Analeigh McQuarter
- Born: November 19, 2008 (age 17); Fontana, California, U.S.
- Occupation: Student

Alena Analeigh (Wicker) McQuarter (born November 19, 2008) is an American student who is the youngest Black person to be accepted into medical school in the United States, and the second-youngest person to be accepted into medical school overall. She is also the youngest person ever to work as an intern at NASA.

== Early life and education ==
Wicker was born in Fontana, California, and grew up outside of Fort Worth, Texas. Her mother is Daphne McQuarter, and she has two sisters.

Wicker began reading books when she was three years old, and developed a love for Lego the following year. In elementary school, she was bullied, and her principal said she "couldn't get all A's because of [her] skin color". Shortly after, McQuarter opted to homeschool her, though Wicker returned to school in fifth grade, continuing an advanced curriculum to complete high school requirements. She spent time living abroad in Amman, Jordan, which inspired her to learn Arabic and Spanish.

Wicker graduated from her high school near Fort Worth, Texas at age 12, after which she began attending Arizona State University. She initially double-majored in astronomical and planetary science and chemistry, hoping to one day be a NASA engineer. After a trip to Jordan with the Brown STEM Girl foundation, she became interested in viral immunology and switched her major to pre-med.

On May 13, 2022, the University of Alabama at Birmingham's Heersink School of Medicine offered Wicker admission in 2024 through the school's Burroughs Wellcome Scholars Early Assurance Program, "which partners with several Black schools in Alabama to offer students early acceptance as they plan to enter medical school." She accepted the offer later that summer.

== Career ==
While completing high school, Wicker "noticed the racial and gender disparities in the science, technology, engineering and mathematics (STEM) fields," which led her to develop the Brown STEM Girl (BSG) website. She imagined using BSG to "create this culture of Brown girls in STEM." She developed a business plan and contacted business people to get the foundation started. BSG provides scholarships, mentorships, internships, and other support to girls of color pursuing education in STEM. BSG also offers opportunities for girls of color to study abroad in Singapore. Wicker founded Dorm Room Makeover™ as part of her First Year College Initiative for first year girls of color majoring in STEM Fields.

In 2021, Wicker became the youngest person to intern for NASA. There, she "worked on various assignments including remote research for the Jet Propulsion Laboratory in Pasadena, California."

On July 28, 2022, Wicker appeared on Good Morning America to discuss her early acceptance into medical school and to offer advice to other young people.

== Awards and honors ==
Because of Wicker's work, multiple mayors have proclaimed April 30 "Brown STEM Girl STEM in the City Day Honoring Women of Color in STEM." The governor of Texas has also included a proclamation.

She is an Ambassador for Saving Our Daughters/Keke Palmer Foundation.

Year	Sponsor	Award/honor	Result	Ref.
2021	Forbes	30 Under 30	Nominee	
2022	TIME and Nickelodeon	Kid of the Year	Finalist	
2022	Global Child Prodigy Awards	World in Science	Recipient	
2022	United States of America	President’s Volunteer Service Lifetime Achievement Award	Recipient	
2022	Ebony	HBCU STEM Queen	Recipient	
