= Allene (given name) =

Allene is a feminine given name. Notable people with the name include:

- Allene Wilson Groves (1896–1986), American civic leader
- Allene Jeanes (1906–1995), American chemical researcher
- Allene Ray (1901–1979), American film actress
- Allene Roberts (1928–2019), American actress
- Allene Tew (1872–1955), American socialite
