= Alena Gerber =

German model, actress and television host (born 1989)

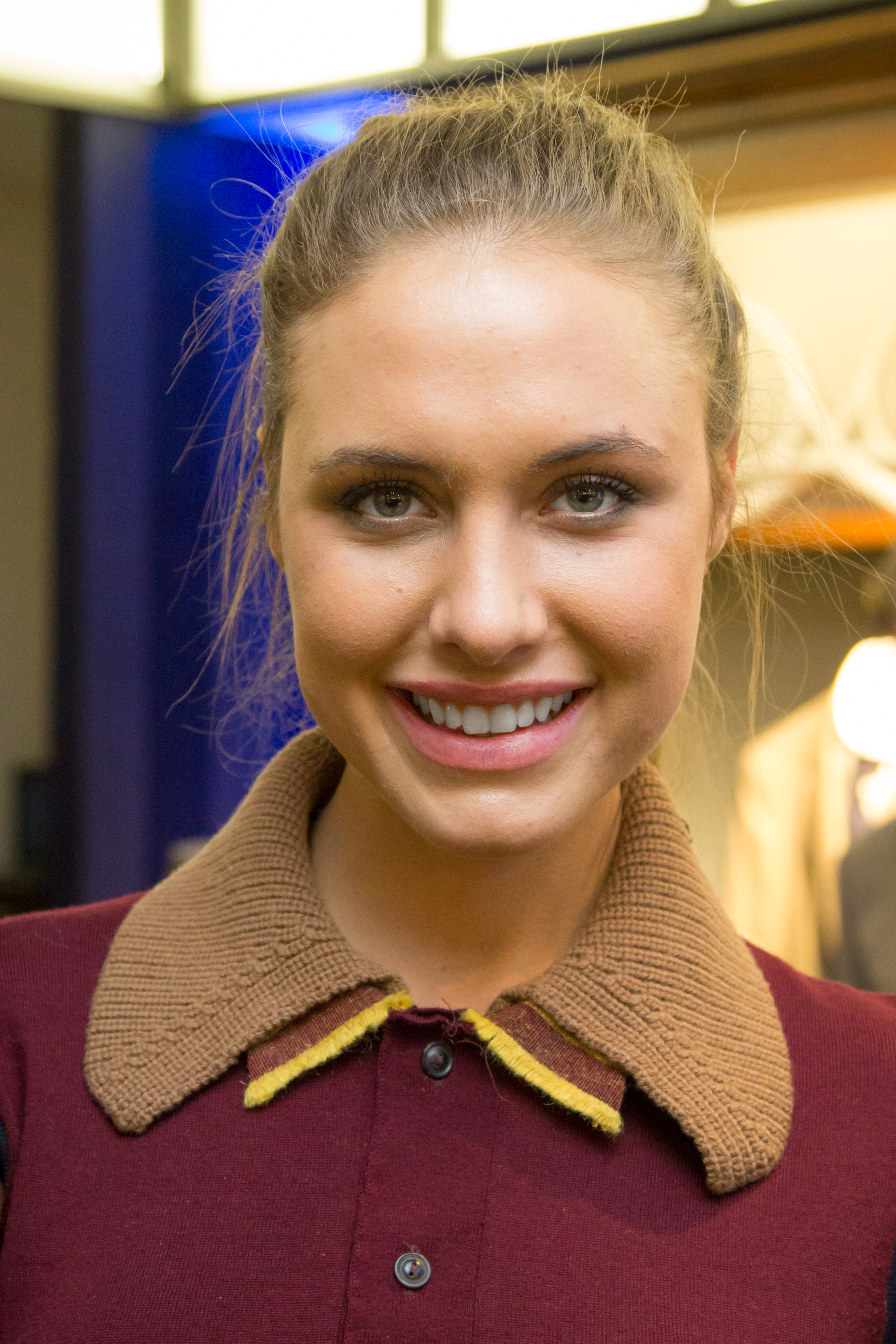
Gerber in 2015

Alena Gerber (born 20 August 1989) is a German model, actress and television presenter.

== Life ==
Gerber was born on 20 August 1989, in Baden-Württemberg, and was discovered by a German model agency at age 13. She participated in regional beauty contests. She also had brief guest appearances on several German TV series and has appeared in a number of German TV shows.

Gerber resides in Switzerland, Germany and the United States. Her agency is Vivienne models.

== TV hosting and acting ==
After numerous appearances on German IPTV channels she started hosting the Zurich Nightlife show usgang.tv (usgang means "going out"/"clubbing" in Swiss German).

In 2010, Gerber was the face of the Streetparade, the Swiss version of the German Loveparade.
