= Miriam Chytilová =

Czech actress and singer

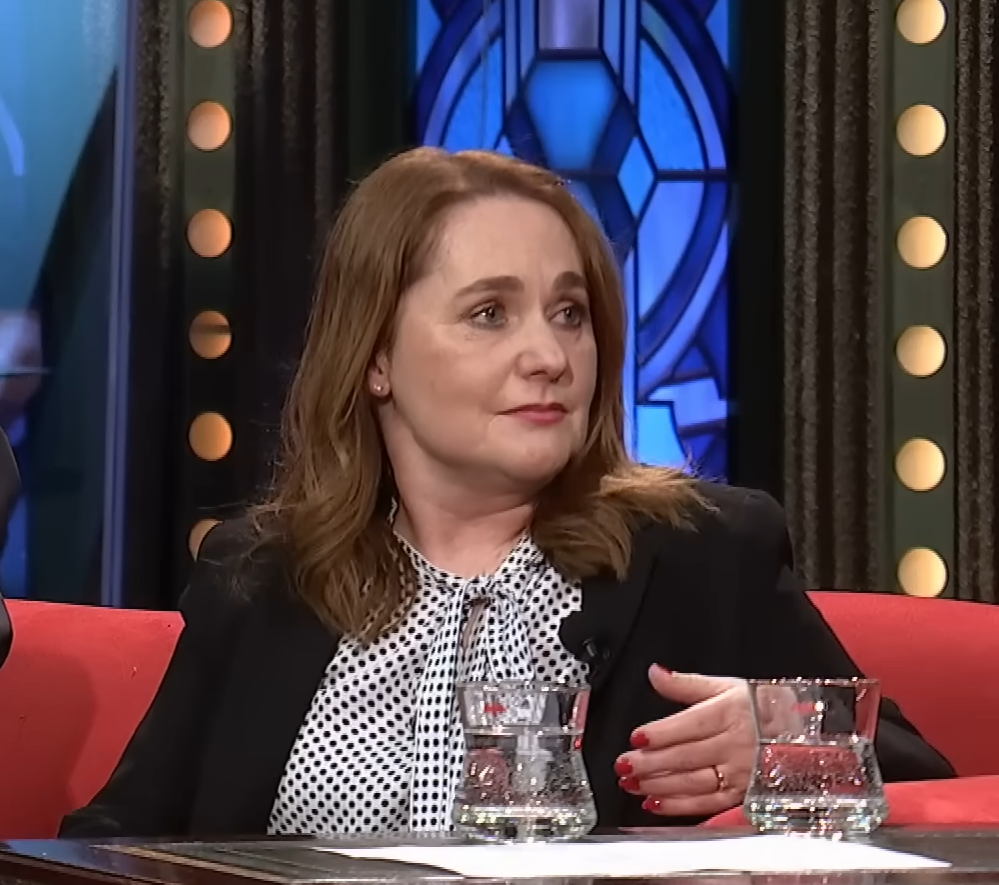

Miriam Chytilová (born 21 June 1965) is a Czech actress and singer. She has dubbed the Czech voice for characters played by Jodie Foster, Romy Schneider, and Jennifer Aniston.

== Partial filmography ==
- 1973: Adam a Otka - Otka
- 1974: 30 případů majora Zemana (TV Series)
- 1975: Osvobození Prahy
- 1975: Chalupáři (TV Series) - Little girl
- 1975: Mys Dobré naděje - Gerta
- 1976: Čas lásky a naděje
- 1976: Borisek, malý seržant - Dívka
- 1976: Odysseus a hvězdy
- 1978: Jak se točí Rozmarýny - Renata
- 1978: Tajemství proutěného košíku (TV Series) - Klárka
- 1979: Indiáni z Větrova - Dite
- 1981: Muž přes palubu
- 1984: Amadeus
- 1984: Rubikova kostka (TV Movie)
- 1984: Bambinot (TV Series)
- 1985: Až do konce - svadlenka Marie
- 1985: Zátah
- 1986: Švec z konce světa (TV Movie) - Betka
- 1988: Případ se psem
- 1990: Dcera národa (TV Movie)
- 1990: Houpačka - Miska
- 1992: Osvětová přednáška v Suché Vrbici (TV Movie) - Irena
- 1993: Konec básníku v Cechách - Jeskynka (voice)
- 1994: Nevěra po císařsku (TV Movie)
- 1996: Kolja
- 2003: Nepodepsaný knoflík (TV Movie)
- 2005: Jasnovidec (TV Movie)
