= Alina (novel) =

2006 novel by Jason Johnson

- Author: Jason Johnson
- Publisher: Dufour
- Publication date: March 2007
- ISBN: 978-0-856-40794-9

Alina is a 2006 novel by Northern Irish writer Jason Johnson. When the eponymous character, an online sex worker or "cam whore", disappears, two mismatched travelling companions leave Belfast for Romania to find her.

The story addresses the abnormality of the underworld relationship between the post-communist east and capitalist west within Europe in the 21st century. It has been described as an exploration of "Ceaușescu's regime via allegory."

== Plot summary ==
Henry Sender discovers that a website he has inherited is an outlet for eastern European webcam operatives, selling themselves live online to customers around the world. As he begins to explore his potentially new career as a webmaster, he "meets" one of his clients, Alina, who rents time on the portal and has a string of disconcerting customers. As an email relationship builds, she suddenly stops communicating and no longer appears online. She had told Henry earlier that she was planning to meet one of her customers in real life.

Suffering from a bipolar disorder and bouts of paranoia, timid Henry hires a bodyguard, Shuff Sheridan, to travel with him to Romania in order to track down Alina. As Sheridan loosens up along the way, he begins to engineer violent episodes as the men travel from Belfast to London, and from Bucharest to Iași. Hard drinking Sheridan picks violent fights with random strangers while consistently consoling a panic stricken Henry by telling him that he is his Protector.

Meanwhile, Alina meets her customer, Gadaka, in the flesh and he takes her to an apartment he has hired in the city of Iași. He explains that he will pay her the large and agreed sum, but that she will have to be his sex slave for eight days. As Alina begins what she hopes will be her final sordid encounter, it appears that Sheridan and Sender simultaneously embark on a night out in the same town during which a Russian mafia enforcer is killed.

Back home in Belfast, elderly Francis Cleary is dying while locked inside a steel box. Unable to escape, he thinks back on his times as a maverick philosophy lecturer and how Sheridan was his most eager student.

After escaping a brutal confrontation in Iași, Sheridan and Sender make it to Alina's home address. They find her hanging, having committed suicide some days before. An unsent file on her computer reveals that she had wanted to send a suicide note to Henry. The message suggests that Alina had been unable to live with the shame after what she had been through. Gadaka had cheated her out of the money he had promised to give her.

While searching through her PC, Henry finds that Gadaka is trying to communicate with him. Gadaka outlines what he had done to Alina as he watches Henry seated beside her corpse on Alina's webcam. As their conversation tumbles into depravity, Henry tricks Gadaka out of a fortune in minute-per-minute webcam fees before challenging Sheridan, who has just returned, bloodied, from another bar.

As Henry learns news of the now deceased Francis' fate back home, and that Sheridan is wanted for imprisoning the old man in an empty oil tank, he comes close to shooting his bodyguard. Ultimately he allows Sheridan to sleep, instead choosing to carry Alina to an historic nearby cathedral. He leaves her at the feet of St Paraskevi, Protector of Iași.

Henry leaves Romania soon after, resolute that he has been somewhere close to Hell and that he must begin an escape from his past personality and his recent life. As Sheridan awakes and makes his way back home, he is arrested in London and imprisoned for life for the murder of philosopher Francis Cleary.

== Reaction ==
Alina received a mixed reception, with critics tending to either rate it highly or dismiss it altogether.

The UK's Independent on Sunday said it was "ambitious but flawed"

American author and critic Frank Sennett said Alina "delivers a climax as harrowing as one might hope to find in contemporary crime fiction."

== Other work ==
- Woundlicker, by Jason Johnson
