= Alene Robertson =

American actress

Alene Robertson is an American musical theatre actress based in Naperville, Illinois. She has been awarded nine Joseph Jefferson Awards (equivalent to the Antoinette Perry "Tony" Awards from the Chicago region). Robertson is best known for acting in the National Tour production of the musical Annie as Miss Hannigan.
