= Alina Tugend =

American journalist

- Born: Los Angeles, California
- Education: U.C. Berkeley
- Occupations: Journalist and author
- Notable credit(s): Author, "Better by Mistake: The Unexpected Benefits of Being Wrong," Wrote "Shortcuts", a biweekly column in The New York Times. 2005-2015
- Spouse: Mark Stein
- Children: 2
- Website: Alina Tugend Official Website

Alina Tugend is an American journalist, public speaker and writer.

== Early life and education ==
Tugend was born in Los Angeles. Her parents are Thomas J. and Rachel (née Spitzer) Tugend.

She majored in journalism and history at the University of California, Berkeley and later earned a Master of Studies in Law at the Yale Law School.

== Career ==
She has written for the Hudson Dispatch in Union City, New Jersey, the Providence, Rhode Island, bureau of United Press International,Education Week, the Los Angeles Herald Examiner, where she started the paper's environment reporting, and the Orange County Register. For six years, starting in 1994, Tugend was the London, England, correspondent for the Chronicle of Higher Education before returning to U.S. in 2000. From 2005-2015 she wrote the award-winning "Shortcuts" column for The New York Times.

Tugend has also written for other newspapers, such as the Los Angeles Times, The Boston Globe, the San Francisco Chronicle and numerous magazines including The Atlantic, National Journal, Government Executive, Family Circle, More, the Columbia Journalism Review and the American Journalism Review.

Tugend was a featured writer for The New York Times Practical Guide to Practically Everything – the Essential Companion for Everyday Life. and "Mistakes I Made at Work: 25 Influential Women Reflect on What They Got Out of Getting It Wrong." Her writing is also included as an example of best essay writing in The Norton Field Guide to Writing, Second Edition.

In March 2011, Tugend published her first book, Better by Mistake: The Unexpected Benefits of Being Wrong (Riverhead). Gretchen Rubin of The Happiness Project praised Better by Mistake as a "great new book" dealing with "how to deal with failure and mistakes in an effective and happier way." Tugend also received the Best in Business for Personal Finance in 2011 from the Society of Business Editors and Writers.

== Personal life ==
Tugend is married to the journalist Mark Stein and they have two children.

== Bibliography ==
- Bernstein, Amy D. (Co-Editor); Bernstein, Peter W. (Co-Editor) (2006). The New York Times Practical Guide to Practically Everything – the Essential Companion for Everyday Life. St. Martin's Press (New York City). ISBN 978-0-312-35388-9.
- Tugend, Alina (2011). Better by Mistake: The Unexpected Benefits of Being Wrong. Riverhead.
