= Lenka, Slovakia =

Village and municipality in Slovakia

Lenka Sajólenke
- Municipality
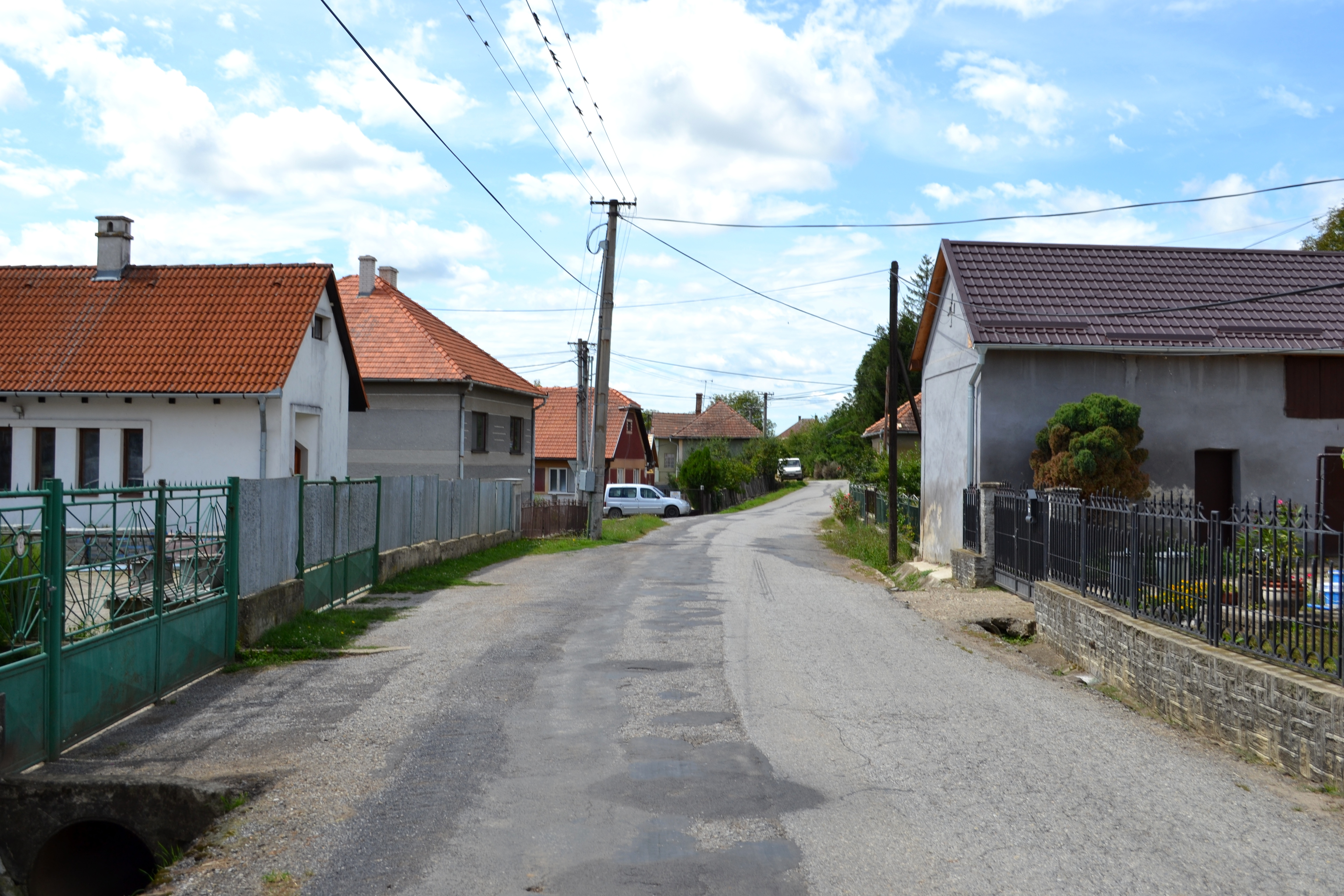

- Flag

- Location of Lenka in the Banská Bystrica Region Location of Lenka in Slovakia
- Coordinates: 48°23′N 20°21′E
- Country: Slovakia
- Region: Banská Bystrica Region
- District: Rimavská Sobota District
- First mentioned: 1323

Area
  - Total: 6.09 km^{2} (2.35 sq mi)
- Elevation: 208 m (682 ft)

Population (2025)
  - Total: 200
- Time zone: UTC+1 (CET)
  - Summer (DST): UTC+2 (CEST)
- Postal code: 980 50
- Area code: +421 47
- Vehicle registration plate (until 2022): RS
- Website: www.obeclenka.sk

Lenka (Hungarian: Sajólenke) is a village and municipality in the Rimavská Sobota District of the Banská Bystrica Region of southern Slovakia.

== Geography ==
The municipality lies at an altitude of 208 metres (682 ft) and covers an area of 6.09 km^{2} (2.35 sq mi) (2025).

== Population ==
Population statistic (10 years)
Year	1995	2005	2015	2025
Count	216	190	186	200
Difference		−12.03%	−2.10%	+7.52%

Population statistic
Year	2024	2025
Count	204	200
Difference		−1.96%

It has a population of 200 people (31 December 2025).

=== Ethnicity ===
Census 2021 (1+ %)
Ethnicity	Number	Fraction
Hungarian	119	59.5%
Slovak	84	42%
Czech	3	1.5%
Total	200	

In year 2021 was 200 people by ethnicity 119 as Hungarian, 84 as Slovak, 3 as Czech, 1 as Ukrainian, 1 as Not found out and 1 as German.

Note on population: The difference values of population numbers in the table "Population statistic" and in the sections "Ethnicity" & "Religion" is caused by the use of various statistical methods.

=== Religion ===
Census 2021 (1+ %)
Religion	Number	Fraction
Calvinist Church	65	32.5%
Evangelical Church	53	26.5%
Roman Catholic Church	49	24.5%
None	24	12%
Greek Catholic Church	4	2%
Ad hoc movements	3	1.5%
United Methodist Church	2	1%
Total	200	

In year 2021 was 200 people by religion 65 from Calvinist Church, 53 from Evangelical Church, 49 from Roman Catholic Church, 24 from None, 4 from Greek Catholic Church, 3 from Ad hoc movements and 2 from United Methodist Church.

In 2001, Lenka had 202 inhabitants of whom 129 were Hungarians and 72 Slovaks.
