= Alina Zotea =

Moldovan economist, model and politician

Alina Zotea-Durnea
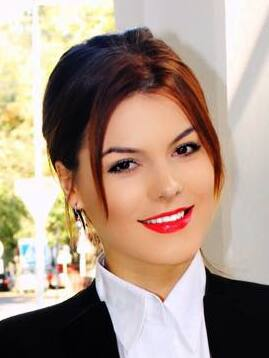
- Zotea-Durnea in 2015

Member of the Moldovan Parliament
- In office 4 September 2015 – 9 March 2019
- Preceded by: Valeriu Munteanu
- Parliamentary group: Liberal Party

Personal details
- Born: 8 December 1986 (age 39) Cantemir, Moldavian SSR, Soviet Union
- Party: Liberal Party (2005-)
- Spouse: Vlad Durnea (m. 2017)
- Education: Moldova State University
- Profession: economist, model

Alina Zotea-Durnea (born 8 December 1986) is a Moldovan economist, model and politician.

== Biography ==
Born in Cantemir, she became a model at age fifteen, and continued her involvement in the activity through her twenties. She graduated from high school in 2007, and in 2011 obtained a degree from the economics faculty of Moldova State University.

Zotea joined the Liberal Party (PL) in 2005, and became a personal assistant to party leader Mihai Ghimpu in 2014. In that year's election for the Parliament of Moldova, she ran on the party's lists, in 19th position. During the campaign, some online commentators questioned her fitness for office, citing her provocative modeling photographs. In August 2015, when five PL members of parliament resigned in order to join the new Streleț Cabinet, one of the vacancies fell to Zotea, who agreed to fill it. Her term began early the following month, after validation from the Constitutional Court.

In autumn 2017, Zotea married Vlad Durnea; she gave birth to a child a year later.
