= Lenka Gazdíková =

Slovak footballer

Personal information
- Date of birth: 18 March 1986 (age 40)
- Place of birth: Bratislava, Czechoslovakia
- Height: 1.75 m (5 ft 9 in)
- Position: Goalkeeper

Senior career*
Years	Team	Apps	(Gls)
- Slovan Bratislava
2005–2012	Sparta Prague		
2012–2013	→ FK Krupka (loan)		

International career
2002–2013	Slovakia		
- * Club domestic league appearances and goals

Lenka Gazdíková (born 18 March 1986) is a Slovak football manager and retired footballer who played as a goalkeeper. She is now the manager of the Slovakia women's national football team.

She was a member of the Slovak national team.
