= Coeur d'Alene =

Coeur d'Alene may refer to a people and related place names in the northwestern United States:

- Coeur d'Alene, Idaho, a city in the United States
  - Coeur d'Alene Airport
  - Coeur d'Alene Charter Academy
  - Coeur d'Alene High School
  - Coeur d'Alene Press
  - Coeur d'Alene Resort
  - Coeur d'Alene School District
- Coeur d'Alene people, a Native American tribe
  - Coeur d'Alene language
  - Coeur d'Alene Reservation

== Geographical features ==
- Coeur d'Alene Mountains, a mountain range in Idaho and Montana
- Coeur d'Alene National Forest, Idaho
- Lake Coeur d'Alene
- Coeur d'Alene River

== Other uses ==
- Coeur d'Alene Avenue Elementary School, Venice, Los Angeles, California
- Coeur d'Alene Mines, an international mining corporation
- Coeur d'Alene salamander
- "Coeur d'Alene", a song from Alter Bridge's album AB III
- Coeur d'Alene Solo, a variation on the Frog card game
