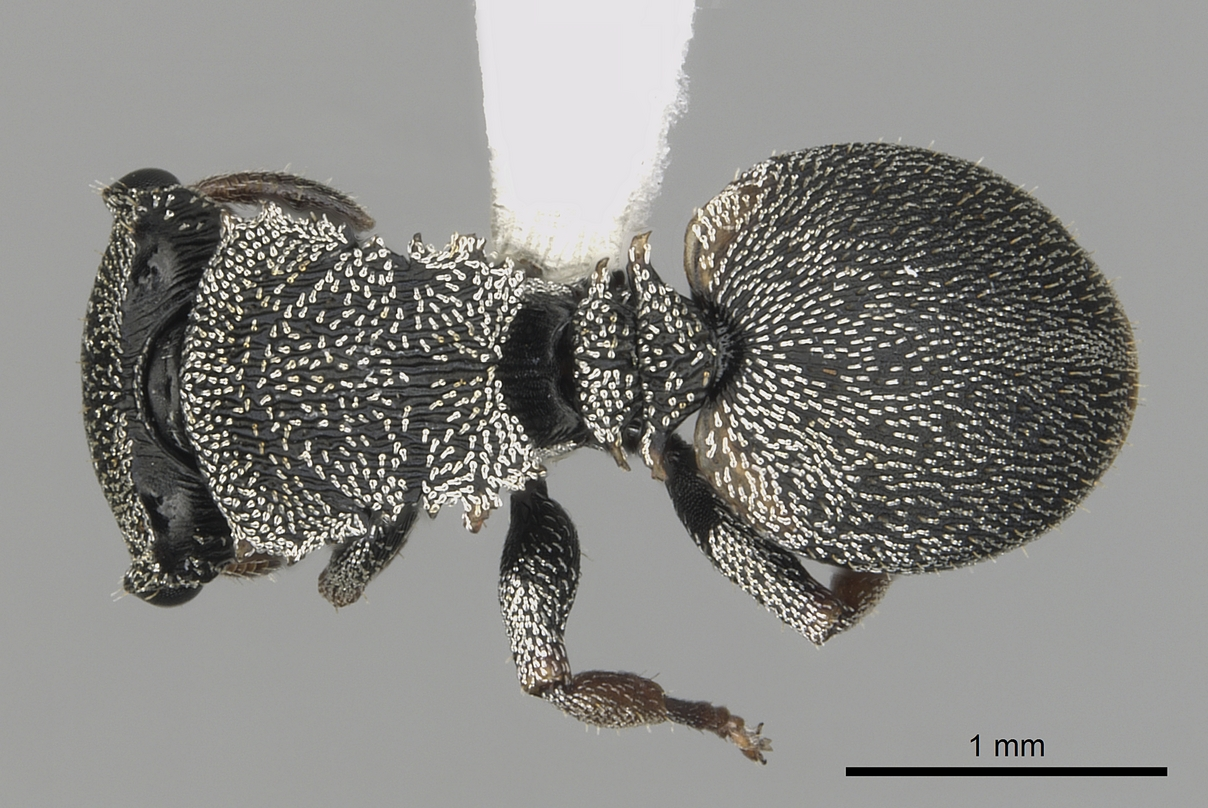

Scientific classification
- Domain: Eukaryota
- Kingdom: Animalia
- Phylum: Arthropoda
- Class: Insecta
- Order: Hymenoptera
- Family: Formicidae
- Subfamily: Myrmicinae
- Genus: Cephalotes
- Species: C. lenca

Binomial name
- Cephalotes lenca De Andrade, 1999

= Cephalotes lenca =

Species of ant

Cephalotes lenca is a species of arboreal ant of the genus Cephalotes, characterized by an odd shaped head and the ability to "parachute" by steering their fall if they drop off of the tree they're on. Giving their name also as gliding ants. The species is native of Nicaragua and Honduras. Their larger and flatter legs, a trait common with other members of the genus Cephalotes, gives them their gliding abilities.

The species was first given a description and a classification in 1999 by Brazilian entomologist Maria de Andrade.
