= Alina Gut =

Polish politician (born 1938)

member of Sejm 2005-2007
- In office 25 September 2005 – 2007

Personal details
- Born: 10 February 1938 (age 88) Lublin
- Party: Samoobrona

Alina Gut, née Suska (born 10 February 1938) is a Polish politician. She was elected to Sejm on 25 September 2005, getting 8455 votes in 6 Lublin district as a candidate from the Samoobrona Rzeczpospolitej Polskiej list.

== See also ==
- Members of Polish Sejm 2005-2007
