= Alina Bucur =

Romanian-American mathematician

Alina Ioana Bucur is a Romanian-born mathematician and an associate professor of mathematics at the University of California, San Diego. Bucur's research is in analytic number theory with an emphasis on arithmetic statistics.

== Education and career ==
After completing her undergraduate studies at the University of Bucharest in 2001, she pursued her graduate studies at Brown University, where she received her Ph.D. in 2006; her dissertation was supervised by Jeffrey Ezra Hoffstein.. After completion of her degree, Bucur was a member of the School of Mathematics at the Institute for Advanced Study in Princeton, New Jersey from 2006 to 2007 and 2009–2010 and a C. L. E. Moore Instructor at the Massachusetts Institute of Technology from 2006 to 2009. She came to the University of California, San Diego, in 2009 as an assistant professor and was granted tenure and promoted to associate professor in 2016. Bucur returned to the Institute for Advanced Study as a von Neumann Fellow of the School of Mathematics from 2018 to 2019.

Bucur has been involved in Women in Numbers (WIN) Network, a professional network for women with research interests in number theory, since its inception. She serves on the WIN Steering Committee. and co-organized Women in Numbers Europe (2013), the European Women in Mathematics Summer School (2014), and the Association for Women in Mathematics Workshop on Women in Number Theory (2017).

Bucur has been an active member of the Association for Women in Mathematics (AWM). She has been AWM Meetings Coordinator and a member of the AWM Executive Committee since August 2018. Prior to becoming a member of the executive committee she served on the Mentor Network Committee (2015–2018) and the Joint Mathematics Meetings Committee (2016–2018).

== Recognition ==
Bucur was named a 2012–2013 Hellman Faculty Fellow by the University of California, San Diego. The award supports junior faculty members in their research and scholarly work as they strive for tenure with the university. Bucur was recognized as a fellow of the Association of Women in Mathematics (AWM) in the class of 2021 "for supporting the research careers of women in mathematics at crucial career stages: locally, at her institution and region; nationally, through leadership in AWM and Women in Numbers; and internationally, through her impactful work in organizing conferences and workshops."

== Edited Collections ==
- Bucur, Alina; Zureick-Brown, David, eds. (2009). Analytic Methods in Arithmetic Geometry. Contemporaty Mathematics. Vol. 740. Providence, Rhode Island: American Mathematical Society. ISBN 9781470437848.
- Bertin, Marie José; Bucur, Alina; Felgon, Brooke; Schneps, Leila, eds. (2015). Women in Numbers Europe: Research Directions in Number Theory. Association for Women in Mathematics Series. New York: Springer Verlag. ISBN 9783319179865.
