= Alina (moth) =

Scientific classification
- Kingdom: Animalia
- Phylum: Arthropoda
- Clade: Pancrustacea
- Class: Insecta
- Order: Lepidoptera
- Superfamily: Noctuoidea
- Family: Erebidae
- Subfamily: Lymantriinae
- Genus: Alina; Griveaud, 1976

Genus of moths

Alina is a genus of moths in the family Erebidae. The genus was erected by Paul Griveaud in 1976.

Species:

- Alina dujardini Griveaud, 1977
- Alina ochroderoea (Mabille, 1897)
- Alina virida (Griveaud, 1977)
