= Tibi (fashion brand) =

American fashion company

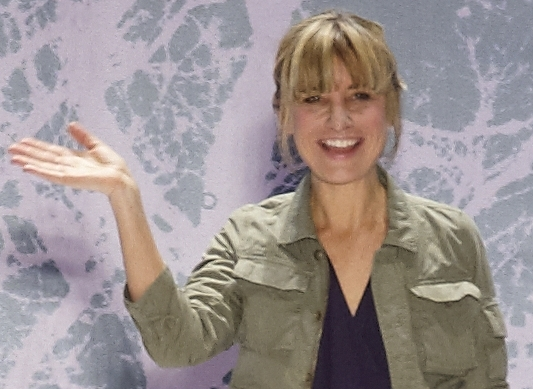
Amy Smilovic presenting the Tibi Fall-Winter 2010 line

Tibi is an American fashion company based in New York City. Tibi's design studio, showroom, and flagship store is located in Soho, New York. It was founded by Amy Smilovic in 1997.

The brand is known for its contemporary and minimalistic design aesthetic, and its clothing and accessories are sold in high-end department stores and boutiques worldwide. Tibi's collections include ready-to-wear, footwear, and handbags.

== Overview ==
Tibi began with a small collection of contemporary dresses. It now produces 11 womenswear collections per year and a full line of women's shoes. Tibi is showcased in the tents of the Lincoln Center each season during New York Fashion Week.

== Clients ==
Tibi-brand clothing is sold in many stores worldwide, including Bergdorf Goodman, Saks Fifth Avenue, Neiman Marcus, Bloomingdales, Harvey Nichols, Harrods, and Selfridges. The first Tibi retail store opened in September 2006 in New York. Tibi opened an outlet store in Saint Simons Island, Georgia in 2015.
