= Alina Frasa =

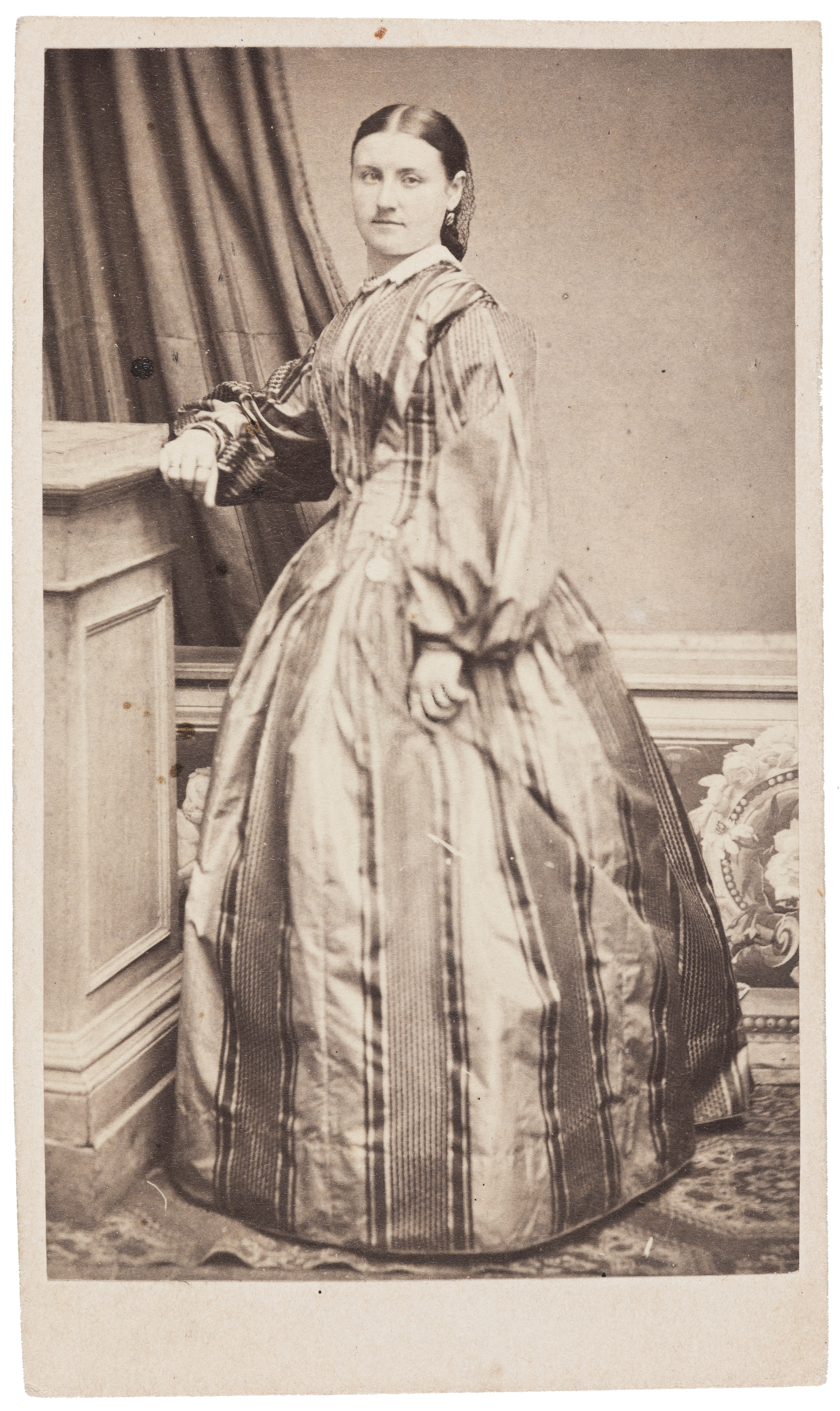
- Alina Frasa in the 1860s
- Born: Helena Anderlé; January 25, 1834; Bad Reichenhall, Bavaria
- Died: May 31, 1899 (aged 65); Helsinki, Finland
- Citizenship: Grand Duchy of Finland
- Occupations: Ballerina, dance teacher

Alina Frasa, born Helena Anderlé, (25 January 1834 – 31 May 1899) was a Finnish ballerina. She is regarded as the first ballerina in Finland and played a significant role in spreading the art of dance throughout the country through nearly half a century of teaching.

== Biography ==
Swiss-born Frasa was the adoptive daughter of the director of a travelling German theater. Born in Bad Reichenhall, she arrived in Turku in the Grand Duchy of Finland at the age of twelve with a touring Italian ballet company from Riga in 1846. It was led by the Genoese ballet master Domenico Rossetti and his wife Johanna Frasa, and included at least six children, all with the stage name Anderlé or Ferla.

Frasa was the leading dancer in the company's children's ballet, and she was noticed and admired in Finland. In Helsinki, she was compared by the audience to Marie Taglioni, who at that time represented the art of dance at its peak. Rossetti also gave dance lessons, where Frasa participated as an assistant. In 1847, the rest of the company continued to St. Petersburg, while Alina Frasa settled in Porvoo with Johanna Frasa, her son Frans Peter Frasa, her daughter Benedicta and son-in-law Christian Petter Breda. Breda then became a music director and accompanied Alina Frasa, who gave ballet lessons. At the inauguration of the Porvoo Theatre in December 1847, Frasa gave a performance accompanied by Breda.

She also gave lessons in Hämeenlinna and Helsinki – in the latter city she performed in inns, something that Zachris Topelius was outraged about in the magazine Helsingfors Tidningar as he felt her talents entitled her to a better environment. Aleksis Kivi is also said to have followed these performances and included her shala dance in his production.

In 1849, Frasa traveled to St. Petersburg to further her education, but rumors spread that she had died of cholera. Finnish benefactors launched a campaign to secure her future, and Governor Johan Mauritz Nordenstam led investigations that established that her real name was Helena Anderlé and that she came from Bad Reichenhall in Bavaria. According to J. V. Lehtonen's biography on Aleksis Kivi, her mother had voluntarily given her to the Frasa family, in accordance with accepted practice among artists.

After returning to Finland, Frasa became the foster daughter of the widow Maria Helena Tammelin in 1851. In January 1852, she was granted Finnish citizenship, and in 1865 she married the merchant Johan Robert Ahrenius. However, she consistently retained the stage name Frasa in public, partly for personal reasons and partly because the name had market value.

Apart from a few years in between, Frasa continued teaching dance almost until her death in Helsinki and took her teaching to most of the provincial towns in Finland.
