= Alena (disambiguation) =

Alena is a feminine given name.

Alena or ALENA may also refer to:

== Arts ==
- Alena (1947 film), a Czech film
- Alena (graphic novel), a Swedish graphic novel
- Alena (2015 film), a Swedish film based on the graphic novel

== Other uses ==
- ALENA (Accord de libre-échange nord-américain, lit. "Agreement of Free Trade, North American"), French acronym for the North American Free Trade Agreement
- Alena (snakefly), a genus of Raphidioptera
- Alena, a genus of moths that were renamed as Aliona
- Carles Aleñá, Spanish footballer
