= Evelina Mambetova =

Crimean Tatar model

- Crimean Tatar: Evelina Zamir qızı Mambetova; Ukrainian: Евеліна Мамбетова; Russian: Эвелина Мамбетова
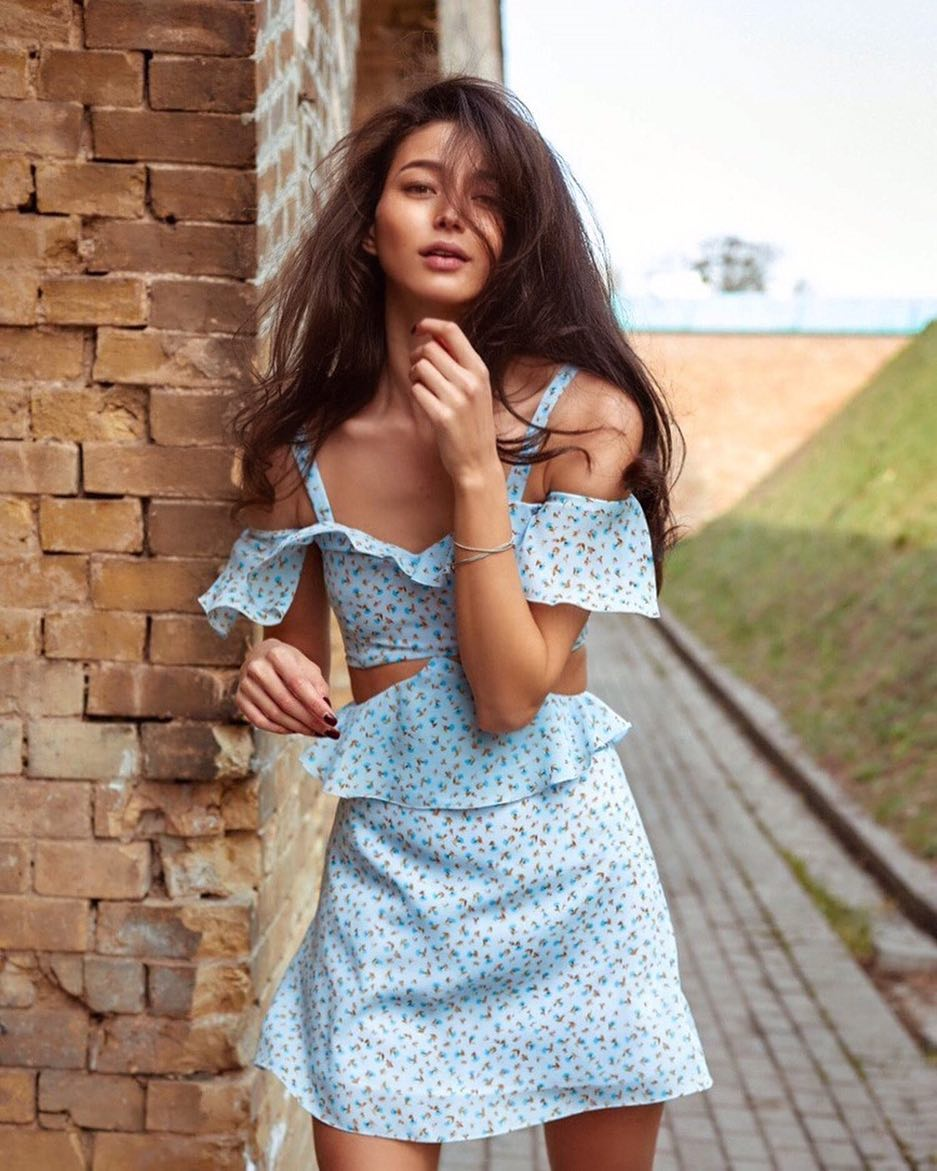
- Evelina Mambetova in 2018
- Born: 28 February 1991 (age 35); Yevpatoria, Crimea
- Modeling information
- Height: 182 cm (6 ft 0 in)
- Hair color: Brown
- Eye color: Brown
- Agency: Next Models, MC2, Supreme, Women, Premier London

Evelina Mambetova (Crimean Tatar: Evelina Zamir qızı Mambetova, Ukrainian: Евеліна Мамбетова; born 28 February 1991) is a Crimean Tatar model.

== Early life ==
Mambetova was born in Crimea, USSR. Her father is businessman, and mother is owner of a beauty salon.

== Career ==
In 2008 she signed with Supreme Management and in September of that year debuted for spring New York Fashion Week on Phillip Lim's and Marc Jabobs's fashion shows. The same month she appeared on Jeremy Laing, Richard Chai and Vera Wang's runways and became a featured rising star in Women's Wear Daily. She appeared on walks at Moschino Cheap & Chic, Sportmax, Issey Miyake, Sonia Rykiel and Yohji Yamamoto in Milan and Paris.

In November 2009, Sofia Sanchez and Mauro Mongiello photographed her for Numéro and in December she was featured in Amica magazine in a photograph taken by Stefano Moro. In February 2009, she appeared in Teen Vogue in a photograph by Thomas Schenk. The same month she went to London for an Eley Kishimoto show. In March 2009 Mambetova appeared in V Magazine as well as the Italian edition of Vogue where Craig McDean photographed her. In September 2009 she was featured in Dazed & Confused magazine photographed by Paulo Sutch and on the catwalk of Alexandre Herchcovitch, Nanette Lepore, Lacoste, and Phillip Lim in New York City. In October 2009 Tim Walker photographed her for Harper's Bazaar. In 2010 she switched from Supreme Management to New York Models. In 2012 she was featured in Vivienne Westwood. In 2012 Mulberry creative defector Emma Hill named a collection of bags after Evelina Mambetova .

== Personal life ==
Mambetova has three sisters: Zamira, Sylvia, and Madina. She graduated from Kiev National University and then Oxford University.
