= Lenka Chytilová =

Czech poet and translator

Lenka Chytilová (born 11 May 1952) is a Czech poet and translator.

== Life ==
Lenka Chytilová was born on 11 May 1952 in Hradec Králové. She first attended the J. K. Tyl Gymnasium in her native city until 1970. She then studied Czech and German at Masaryk University in Brno. She graduated in 1975 with a thesis on the poet Paul Celan. She then worked as a poetry editor for the Kruh publishing house in Hradec Králové, which specialized in the East Bohemia region. She published non-fiction books related to the region as well as fiction by East Bohemian authors. She was dismissed in 1989 for political reasons, but was reinstated as editor-in-chief in 1990. She held this position for two years, after which she worked for the publishing house Ivo Železný in Prague. Her last position was as a teacher of Czech language and literature at J. K. Tyl Gymnasium in 2011.

In the late 1960s, Chytilová began publishing poems in the local newspaper Pochodeň, and in the following two decades she published in the magazines Mladý svět, Literární měsíčník and Mladá fronta, among others, and later mainly in Literární noviny.

In 1977, her first volume of poetry, Dopisy (literally translated as "letters"), was published by Kruh. These were love poems. This was followed by Třetí planeta ("The Third Planet"), Proč racek přemýšlí ("Why Does the Seagull Think"), where she took up the theme of childhood, and Průsvitný Sisyfos ("The Transparent Sisyphus"). In Nebe nadoraz (1995), she turned to religious themes. Chytilová writes modern, reflective poetry that strives for originality. She plays with the sound of words and their etymological relationship.

Chytilová also translated works by other authors from German into Czech in the 1990s, including Henry Seymour, Martin Eisele, Brigitte Huber and Charlotte Lamb.

== Works ==
- Dopisy. Kruh, Hradec Králové 1977.
- Třetí planeta. Melantrich. Prague 1979.
- Sometimes the female cuckoo writes to me: poems. With László Nagy. German by Reiner Kunze. Pongratz, Hauzenberg 1982, ISBN 978-3-923313-07-5.
- Proč racek přemýšlí. Kruh, Hradec Králové 1984.
- Průsvitný Sisyfos. Kruh, Hradec Králové 1988.
- Nebe nadoraz. Alternativa JM, 1995, ISBN 80-900733-3-6.

== Translations ==
- Charlotte Lamb: Z lásky k rodině. (For the love of family). Ivo Železný, Prague 1993, ISBN 80-237-0691-8.
- Henry Seymour: Nebezpečná plavba sladkých hrdliček. (Dangerous boat trip of the love isles). Ivo Železný, Prague 1993, ISBN 80-237-0631-4.
- Martin Eisele: Zamilovaná do své krásy. Ivo Železný, Prague 1994, ISBN 80-237-0734-5.
- Susanne Maas: Schůzka po francouzsku. (Rendezvous in French). Ivo Železný, Prague 1994, ISBN 80-237-1132-6.
- Nadia Nottingham: Kouzelná mezihra. (Enchanting Interlude). Ivo Železný, Prague 1994, ISBN 80-237-1122-9.
- Edith Schapelwein: Přírodní kosmetika od hlavy k patě. Ivo Železný, Prague 1995, ISBN 80-237-2210-7.
- Wolfhart Berg: S vlky výti. (Howling with the wolves). Ivo Železný, Prague 1995, ISBN 80-237-3504-7.
- Brigitte Huber: Muž, který se ke mně hodí. (The man who suits me). Ivo Železný, Prague 1997, ISBN 80-237-2404-5.
- Bedrich Rohan: Kafka bydlel za rohem. (Kafka lived around the corner). Brána, Prague 1997, ISBN 80-85946-73-4.
- Max Lüscher: Čtyřbarevný člověk. (The 4-colored man). Ivo Železný, Prague 1997, ISBN 80-237-3491-1.
- Astrid Seele: Ženy kolem Goetha. (Women around Goethe). Brána, Prague 1998, ISBN 80-7243-007-6.
