= Lina =

Lina (/ˈliːnə/ LEE-nə) is a feminine given name with many origins in different nations. It's largely the short form of a variety of names ending in -lina including Adelina, Angelina, Carmelina, Carolina, Catalina, Emelina, Evangelina, Evelina, Karolina, Italina, Marcelina, Paschalina, Melina, Nikolina, Paulina, Rosalina, and Žaklina.

Apart from that it can be the feminine form of Lin, Lino, Linos (Λῖνος) or Linus.

Languages of origin include: Greek, Arabic, English, Italian, Kurdish, Lithuanian, Persian, Russian, Sanskrit, Spanish, Swedish, Turkish. In 2011 and since, it has been one of the most popular given female names in Germany. Lina has been one of the most popular female names in France since 2019. In other languages, such as Danish and Norwegian, the form Line is more common.

Lina has a different meaning in different languages for example "Lina" in Arabic refers to a "small, young palm tree", or the classical plural meaning of "palm trees". It is a direct Quranic Arabic (Classical Arabic) name. Figuratively, Lina means "tender" or "tenderness" and "delicate".

In Chinese, li (丽) means "pretty" and na (娜) means "elegant".

It can be seen as the Greek name Lina (Λίνα). In Greek, it means "sunlight", and also refers to the olive crown used for a hero. Otherwise it can be connected to línon (λίνον) "flax".

In Kurdish, it means "cascade falls" (تئاڤگەی بچوک).

In India it refers to Goddess Lakshmi, the Goddess of fortune, good luck, riches and splendor.

Lina is the female form of Linas, a common given name among people of Lithuanian descent. The name is associated with a fair complexion, as flax turns into yellowish straw when it matures. The flax plant is a widely used motif in Lithuanian folk songs, where its blue blossoms and golden-yellow straw are compared to the fair complexion of a young person, usually a beautiful girl. It can also be construed as a rare feminine form of Linus.

In Persian, it means "light, a ray of sunlight, beautiful girl".

In the Russian language, Lina (Ли́на) is a diminutive form of the female name Avelina.

== Given name at first ==
- Lina Ahmed (born 1997), Egyptian hurdler
- Lina Allemano (born 1979), Canadian musician
- Lina Andersson (born 1981), Swedish cross-country skier
- Lina Andrijauskaitė (born 1987), Lithuanian track and field athlete
- Lina Annab (born 1966), Jordanian businessperson, politician and the previous
- Lina Aristodimou (born 1965), Cypriot alpine skier
- Lina Attalah (born 1983), Egyptian media figure and journalist
- Lina Maria Becker (1898–1976), German politician
- Lina Beecher (1841–1915), American inventor and roller coaster engineer
- Lina Bejjani (born 1984), Lebanese sprinter
- Lina Ben Mhenni (1983–2020), Tunisian Internet activist, blogger and lecturer
- Lina Bertucci (born 1958), American artist
- Lina Bo Bardi (1914–1992), Italian-born Brazilian modernist architect
- Lina Boqvist (born 25 May 1991), Swedish professional golfer
- Lina Boussaha (born 1999), French professional footballer
- Lina Braknytė (born 1952), Lithuanian actress
- Lina Brockdorff (1930–2026), Maltese writer, playwright and radio broadcaster
- Lina Bruna Rasa (1907–1984), Italian operatic soprano
- Lina Bryans (1909–2000), Australian modernist painter
- Lina Buffolente (1924–2007), Italian comic artist and illustrator
- Lina Carstens (1892–1978), German actress
- Lina Chartrand (1948–1994), Canadian writer
- Lina Chatkevičiūtė (born 1981), Lithuanian ballroom dancer
- Lina Cheryazova (1968–2019), Uzbek freestyle skier
- Lina Choueiri, Lebanese linguist
- Lina Condes (born 1988), Ukrainian artist
- Lina Dencik, British social scientist
- Lina Dorado (born 1975), Colombian contemporary artist and filmmaker
- Lina Dussan (born 1998), Colombian rhythmic gymnast
- Lina Eckenstein (1857–1931), British polymath and historian
- Lina Zahr Eddine (born 1975), Lebanese news presenter and talk show host
- Lina El Arabi
- Lina El Tannir, (born 1987), Egyptian squash player
- Lina Englund (born 1975), Swedish actress and musician
- Lina Engren (born 1977), Swedish bobsledder
- Lina Esco (born 1985), American actress, producer, director and activist
- Lina Eve (born 1946), Australian artist, adoption activist, singer/songwriter, photographer and filmmaker
- Lina Fedorova (born 1997), Russian pair skater
- Lina Franziska Fehrmann (1900–1950), German artist model
- Lina Flor, nickname of Carolina Flores-Trinidad (1914–1976), Filipina writer
- Lina Flórez (born 1984), Colombian hurdle athlete
- Lina Fruzzetti
- Lina Gjorcheska (born 1994), Macedonian tennis player
- Lina Glushko (born 2000), Israeli tennis player
- Lina Granados (born 1994), Colombian footballer
- Lina Grinčikaitė-Samuolė (born 1987), Lithuanian sprint athlete
- Lina Guérin (born 1991), French rugby union player
- Lina Haag (1907–2012), German anti-Fascist activist
- Lina Hahne (born 1984), Swedish beauty queen and Miss Sweden 2007
- Lina Hawyani al-Hasan (born 1975), Syrian novelist, journalist and writer
- Lina Frank Hecht (1848–1920), American philanthropists
- Lina Hedlund (born 1978), Swedish singer and member of Alcazar
- Lina Heleika (born 2010), Egyptian rhythmic gymnast
- Lina Herasymenko (born 1974), Ukrainian archer
- Lina Heydrich (1911–1985), German Nazi and wife of SS-Obergruppenführer Reinhard Heydrich
- Lina Hidalgo (born 1991), American politician
- Lina Higiro
- Lina Hurtig (born 1995), Swedish footballer
- Lina Jacques-Sébastien (born 1985), French sprint athlete
- Lina Johansson (born 1988), Swedish former competitive figure skater
- Lina Kačiušytė (born 1963), Lithuanian swimmer
- Lina Jamil Karam, American electrical and computer engineer
- Lina Khalifeh (born 1986), Jordanian black belt taekwondo champion and activist against sexual harassment in Jordan
- Lina Khan, (born 1989) English-born American jurist
- Lina Khelif (born 1997), Algerian footballer
- Lina Khoury (born 1976), Lebanese theatre director, writer, producer, and educator
- Lina Krhlikar (born 1989), Slovenian handball player
- Lina Knudsen (born 1985), Danish curler
- Lina Kostenko (born 1930), Ukrainian poet and writer
- Lina Kozomara (born 2005), Swiss freestyle skier
- Lina Krasnoroutskaya (born 1984), Russian retired tennis player
- Lina Kuduzović (born 2002), Slovenian singer
- Lina Länsberg (born 1982), Swedish mixed martial artist
- Lina Lazaar (born 1983), Tunisian art critic
- Lina Leandersson (born 1995), Swedish actress
- Lina Lehtovaara (born 1981), Finnish football referee
- Lina Ljungblom (born 2001), Swedish ice hockey player
- Lina Lossen (1878–1959), German stage and film actress
- Lina Lundqvist (born 1993), Swedish footballer
- Lina Loh (born 1949), Singaporean politician
- Lina Magaia (1940–2011), Mozambican writer, journalist and war veteran
- Lina Magull (born 1994), German footballer.
- Lina Makhul (born 1993), Palestinian singer-songwriter
- Lina Mangiacapre (1946–2002), Italian playwright and filmmaker
- Lina Marengo (1911–1987), Italian actress
- Lina Marín (??–1989), Mexican actress
- Lina Marulanda (1980–2010), Colombian television personality and model
- Lina Mathon-Blanchet (1903–1994), Haitian pianist, music teacher and composer
- Lina Medina (born 1933), the youngest confirmed mother in medical history
- Lina Meruane (born 1970), Chilean writer and professor
- Lina Mittner (1919–2013), Swiss alpine skier
- Lina María Moreno Mejía (born 1955), Colombian First Lady
- Lina Montes (1923–1984), Cuban actress
- Lina Morgenstern (1830–1909), German writer, educator, feminist and pacifist
- Līna Mūze (born 1992), Latvian track and field athlete
- Lina Murr Nehmé (born 1955), French-Lebanese author
- Lina Ng (born 1974), Singaporean actress and host
- Lina Nilsson (born 1987), Swedish retired footballer
- Lina Nilsson (scientist), American biomedical engineer
- Lina Nyberg (born 1970), Swedish jazz singer and composer
- Lina M. Obeid (1955–2019), American physician and cancer researcher
- Lina Ódena (1911–1936) Spanish communist and miliciana
- Lina Olsson Rosenberg (born 1971), Swedish handball player
- Lina Pagliughi (1907–1980), Italian-American opera singer
- Lina Pereira, Brazilian singer
- Lina Persson (born 1982), Swedish orienteering competitor
- Lina Pires de Campos (1918–2003), Brazilian pianist, music educator and composer
- Lina Pizzolongo (1925–1991), Canadian vocal coach and concert pianist
- Lina Polito (born 1954), Italian actress
- Lina Puerta (born 1969), American mixed media artist
- Lina Qostal (born 1997), Moroccan tennis player
- Lina Rafn (born 1976), Danish female singer, songwriter and producer in the band Infernal
- Lina Ramann (1833–1912), German writer and teacher
- Lina Rivas (born 1990), Colombian weightlifter
- Lina Rodriguez, Canadian filmmaker
- Lina Olinda Pedraza Rodríguez, Cuban politician
- Lina Ron (1959–2011), Venezuelan political leader
- Lina Rosales (born 1928), Spanish film and television actress
- Lina Šaltytė-Masilionė (born 1987), Lithuanian female rower
- Lina Santiago (born 1978), American singer and musician
- Lina Sarmiento (born 1958), Filipino police officer
- Lina Sastri (born 1953), Italian actress and singer
- Lina Penna Sattamini, Brazilian interpreter
- Lina Scott Gatty (1873–1964), British politician
- Lina Shabib, Jordanian politician
- Lina Sontag (born 2003), German basketball player
- Lina Stančiūtė (born 1986), Lithuanian tennis player
- Lina Stergiou, Greek architect
- Lina Stern (1878–1968), Soviet biochemist, physiologist and humanist
- Lina Larissa Strahl (born 1997), German singer-songwriter and actress
- Lina Strand (born 1988), Swedish orienteering competitor
- Lina Nerli Taviani (born 1937), Italian costume designer
- Lina Teoh (born 1976), Malaysian actress, TV Host, model and Miss Malaysia World 1998
- Lina Thomsgård (born 1978), Swedish columnist, DJ, and PR consultant
- Lina Trivedi (born 1973), American entrepreneur, author, educator and public servant
- Lina Tsaldari (1887–1981), Greek politician
- Lina van de Mars (born 1979), German TV presenter, motor athlete and drummer
- Lina Iris Viktor (born 1987), British-Liberian visual artist
- Lina Volonghi (1914–1991), Italian actress
- Lina von Perbandt (1836–1884), German painter
- Lina Wertmüller (1928–2021), Italian film director
- Lina Wester (born 1992), Swedish ice hockey
- Lina Woiwode (1886–1971), Austrian actress
- Lina Wolff (born 1973), Swedish novelist and short story writer
- Lina Yakubova (1976–2011), American film producer and writer
- Lina Yakupova (born 1990), Russian footballer
- Lina Yegros (1914–1978), Spanish film actress

== Nickname ==
- Lina (American singer) stagename of Shelina Wade, American recording artist
- Lina (South Korean singer), stagename of Lee Ji-yeon (born 1984) South Korean singer who is a member of The Grace
- Lina, nickname of Savelina Fanene, who is better known as Nia Jax (born 1984), American professional wrestler and model
- Lina Basquette, whose birthname is Lena Copeland Baskette (1907–1994), American actress
- Lina Bo Bardi whose birthname was Achillina Bo (1914–1992), Italian-born Brazilian modernist architect
- Lina Cavalieri, whose birthname is Natalina Cavalieri (1874–1944), Italian operatic soprano, actress, and monologist
- Lina Espina-Moore, whose birthname was Austregelina Espina (1919–2000), Filipina writer
- Lina Gennari, whose birthname was Carolina Gennari (1911–1997), Italian actress and operetta singer
- Lina Hähnle, whose name is Emilie Karoline Hähnle (1851–1941), German conservationist
- Lina Jonn, whose birth name is Carolina Johnsson, (1861–1896), Swedish professional photographer
- Lina Joy, converted name of Azlina Jailani, Malay convert
- Lina Loos, whose birthname was Carolina Catharina Obertimpfler (1882–1950), Austrian actress and writer
- Lina Mayer, whose birthname is Karolína Majerníková, Slovak singer and dancer
- Lina Merlin, nickname of Angelina Merlin (1887–1979), Italian politician
- Lina Morgan, stage name of María de los Ángeles López Segovia OAXS MML (20 March 1936 – 19 August 2015), Spanish film, theatre and television actress and showgirl
- Lina Nikolakopoulou, whose name is Evangelia Nikolakopoulou (Λίνα Νικολακοπούλου) (born 1958), Greek lyricist
- Lina Ortega, nickname of Evelina Ortega, American politician
- Lina Pasini-Vitale, stagename of Carolina Pasini-Vitale, (1872–1959), Italian soprano
- Lina Poletti, nickname of Cordula Poletti (1885– 971), Italian writer, poet, playwright and feminist
- Lina Prokofiev, whose birthname is Carolina Codina (1897–1989), Spanish singer
- Lina Radke, nickname of Karoline Radke-Batschauer (1903–1983), German track and field athlete
- Lina Romay, whose birthname is Rosa María Almirall Martínez (1954–2012). Spanish actress
- Lina Romay (singer), whose name is Maria Elena Romay (1919–2010), Mexican-American actress and singer
- Lina Sandell, whose birthname is Karolina Wilhelmina Sandell-Berg (1832–1903), Swedish poet and author of gospel hymns
- Lina Salomé, stage name of Luz de Peña Matos Estévez, Cuban-born Mexican dancer and actress
- Lina Spies, Carellina Pieternella Spies (born 1939), Afrikaans poet and academic
- Lina Waterfield, nickname of Caroline Lucie Waterfield (1874–1964), French-born, English journalist
- Lina, a nail stylist NPC and antagonist from the video game Dress to Impress

== Given name at last ==
- Fan Lina (fl early 2000s), Chinese sprint canoer
- Huo Lina (born 1973), Chinese ice hockey player
- Lei Lina (born 1988), Chinese table tennis player
- Liu Lina (born 1979), Chinese equestrian
- Pan Lina (born 1977), Chinese footballer
- Wang Lina (athlete) (born 1983), Chinese long jumper
- Wang Lina (boxer) (born 1997), Chinese boxer
- Wang Lina (sport shooter) (born 1971), Chinese sport shooter
- Wang Lina (volleyball) (born 1978), Chinese volleyball player
- Xia Lina (born 1987), Chinese female alpine ski racer
- Yang Lina (1963–2010), Singaporean actress
- Yu Lina (born 1940), Chinese violinist
- Zhang Lina (1940–2020), Chinese polymer physical chemist
- Zhao Lina (born 1991), Chinese footballer

== Surname ==
- Ria Lina (born 1980), British comedian, actress and writer

== Middle name ==
- Ethel Lina White (1876–1944), British crime writer
- Florence Lina Mouissou (born 1972), Congolese novelist
- Domenicangela Lina Unali (born 1936), Italian English Literature Professor

== Fictional characters ==
- Lina Inverse, sorceress from the anime series Slayers
- Lina Mayfleet, a main character in the series Books of Ember

== See also ==
- Li Na (disambiguation)
- Wang Lina (disambiguation)
- Leena
- Lena (name)
- Liina
- Lina (surname)
- Linas
