= Linos (disambiguation) =

Linos is the name shared by various characters in Greek mythology.

Linos may also refer to:

- Linos (given name), a masculine given name
- Linos (Mysia), a town of ancient Mysia, now in Turkey
- Linos (operating system), an embedded distribution of Linux

== See also ==
- Lino (disambiguation)
- Linus (disambiguation)
- Lions (disambiguation)
