= Linus (disambiguation) =

Linus is a male given name.

Linus may also refer to:

== Business ==
- Linus Airways, a regional airline in Indonesia that ceased operations in 2009
- Linus Entertainment, a Canadian record label
- Linus Media Group, a Canadian digital media entertainment company
- Linus Write-Top, an early tablet computer manufactured by Linus Technologies, Inc.

== Music ==
- Linus (band), an indie/riot grrrl band
- Linus (opera), a lost opera by Jean-Philippe Rameau
- (Like) Linus, the Deftones' first demo tape

== People ==
- Pope Linus (died c. 76), second Bishop of Rome and Pope of the Catholic Church
- Alto Linus (born 1986), Malaysian former footballer
- Linus (deejay), Italian radio host Pasquale Di Molfetta (born 1957)
- Linus of Hollywood and Linus Dotson, American singer, songwriter, musician and record producer Kevin Dotson (born 1973)
- Stephanie Okereke Linus, Nigerian actress, film director and model, born Stephanie Onyekachi Okereke in 1982
- Linus Van Pelt (born 1950), from the comic strip Peanuts, and associated media

== Other uses ==
- Ben Linus, a character in the American television show Lost
- Linus (magazine), Italian comics magazine published since 1965
- Linus (Mysia), a town of ancient Mysia, now in Turkey
- Linus Beach, a beach on Snow Island, South Shetland Islands, Antarctica
- LINUS (fusion experiment), an experimental reactor built in 1972
- Linus (moon), a moon of asteroid 22 Kalliope
- Winter Storm Linus, a 2014–2015 storm

== See also ==
- Hellinsia linus, a moth species
- Monoaster linus, a beetle species
- Opharus linus, a moth species
- Linos (disambiguation)
