= Evelina (given name) =

Evelina is a feminine given name. It is either a Latinised variant of Evelyn or an extension of Eva. Notable people with the name include:

== People ==
- Evelina (singer), Finnish singer and songwriter Eveliina Tammenlaakso (born 1995)
- Evelina Atalyants (born 2007), Uzbek rhythmic gymnast
- Evelina Borea (born 1931), Italian art historian, author and curator
- Evelina Duljan (born 2003), Swedish footballer
- Evelina Fernandez, American playwright and actress
- Evelina Haverfield (1867–1920), British suffragette and aid worker
- Evelina Kos (born 1996), Slovenian footballer
- Evi Maltagliati (1908–1986), Italian stage, television and film actress
- Evelina Papantoniou (born 1979), Greek fashion model, actress and 2001 Miss Universe runner-up
- Evelina Papoulia (born 1971), Greek actress and dancer
- Evelina Petrova (born 1974), Russian composer and accordion player
- Evelina Puzaitė (born 1982), Lithuanian classical pianist, composer and writer
- Evelina Raselli (born 1992), Swedish ice hockey player
- Evelina de Rothschild (1839–1866), English socialite
- Evelina Samuelsson (born 1984), Swedish ice hockey player
- Evelina Stading (1803–1829), Swedish landscape painter
- Evelina Tshabalala (born 1965), South African marathon runner and mountaineer
- Evelina Tsvetanova (born 1974), Bulgarian former volleyball player
- Evelina Vorontsova (born 1972), Russian/Dutch concert pianist and pedagogue

== Fictional characters ==
- Evelina Anville, title character of the 1778 novel Evelina
- Evelina Bowen, major character in Indian Summer (1886) by William Dean Howells
- Evelina Bunner, in the novella Bunner Sisters by Edith Wharton
- a main character in the 1788 opera Arvire et Évélina

== See also ==
- Evalina, a genus of sea snails
- Eveline (given name)
