= 1998–99 FA Premier League =

Football season in England

FA Premier League
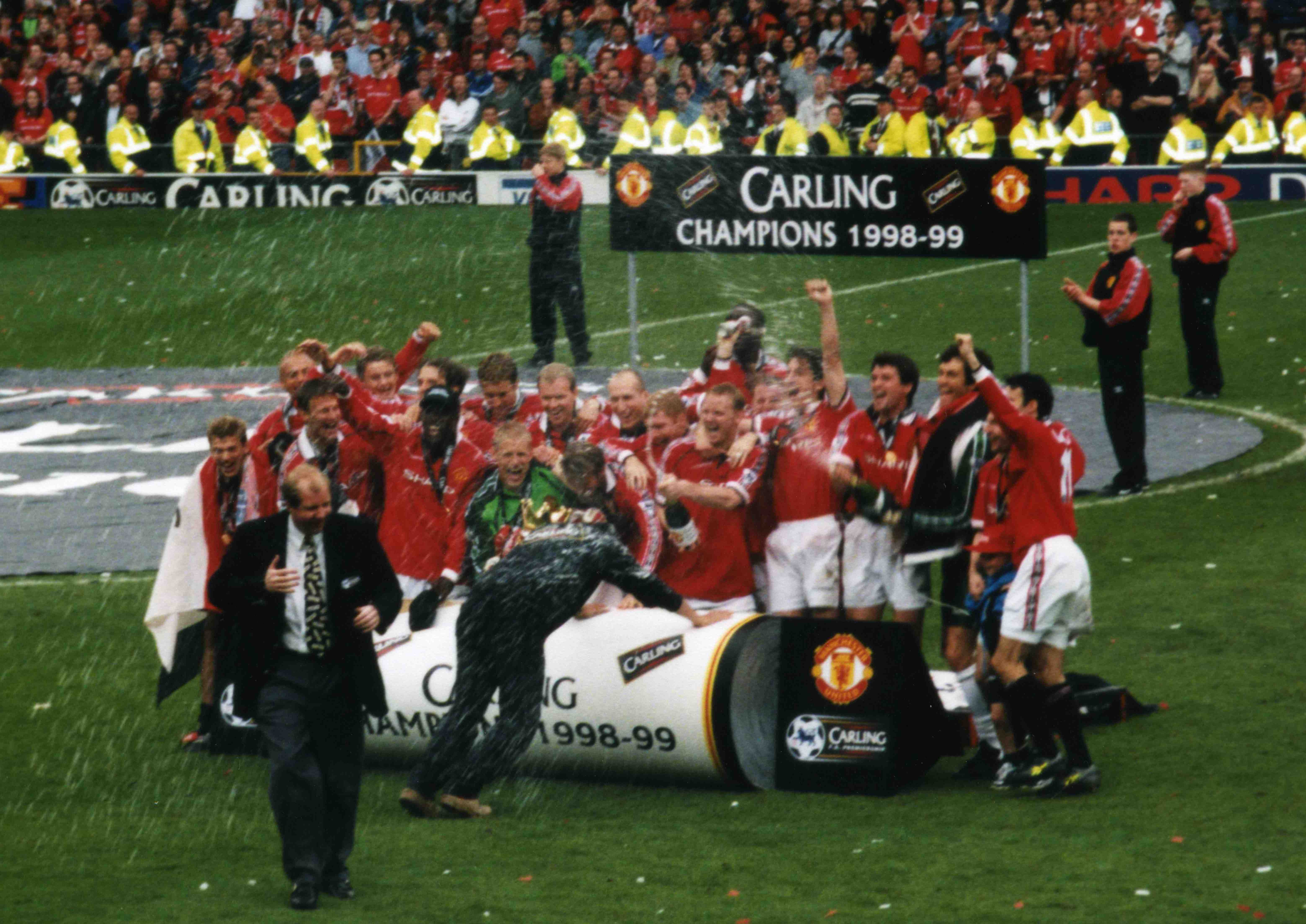
- Season: 1998–99
- Dates: 15 August 1998 – 16 May 1999
- Champions: Manchester United; 5th Premier League title 12th English title
- Relegated: Charlton Athletic; Blackburn Rovers; Nottingham Forest
- Champions League: Manchester United; Arsenal; Chelsea
- UEFA Cup: Leeds United; Newcastle United; Tottenham Hotspur
- Intertoto Cup: West Ham United
- Matches: 380
- Goals: 959 (2.52 per match)
- Top goalscorer: Jimmy Floyd Hasselbaink; Michael Owen; Dwight Yorke (18 goals each)
- Best goalkeeper: David Seaman (19 clean sheets)
- Biggest home win: Liverpool 7–1 Southampton (16 January 1999); Everton 6–0 West Ham United (8 May 1999)
- Biggest away win: Nottingham Forest 1–8 Manchester United (6 February 1999)
- Highest scoring: Nottingham Forest 1–8 Manchester United (6 February 1999)
- Longest winning run: 7 games Leeds United
- Longest unbeaten run: 21 games Chelsea
- Longest winless run: 19 games Nottingham Forest
- Longest losing run: 8 games Charlton Athletic
- Highest attendance: 55,316; Manchester United 2–1 Southampton (27 February 1999)
- Lowest attendance: 11,717; Wimbledon 2–1 Coventry City (5 December 1998)
- Total attendance: 11,623,113
- Average attendance: 30,587

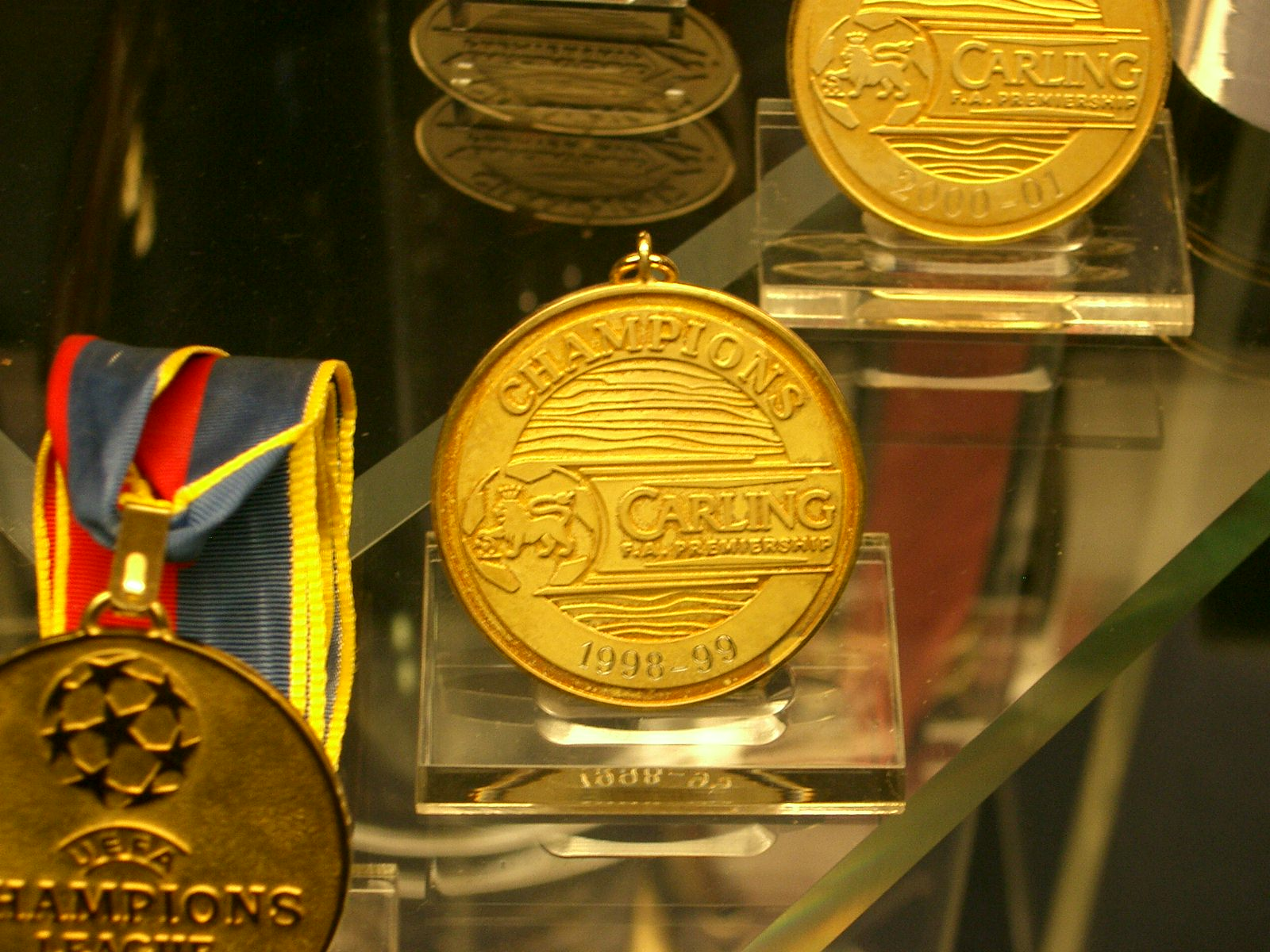
Winner's medal from the 1998–99 Premier League (Manchester United Museum)

The 1998–99 FA Premier League (known as the FA Carling Premiership for sponsorship reasons) was the seventh season of the Premier League, the top division of English football, since its establishment in 1992. Manchester United won a treble of the league title, the FA Cup and the UEFA Champions League. They secured their fifth league title in seven seasons after outlasting Arsenal and Chelsea in a closely fought title race, losing just three league games all season.

The season was also the 100th season of top flight football in England, not counting years lost to the two World Wars. Of the original clubs in the first Football League season, only Aston Villa, Blackburn Rovers, Derby County and Everton were present for this season.

Arsenal failed to retain their title, despite having the same points tally as last season 78 points, but had at one point looked as though they were on the brink of winning the title, after beating fellow rivals Tottenham Hotspur, while Manchester United had drawn against Liverpool, 2–2. However, Manchester United pushed on and took advantage of Arsenal's 1–0 defeat at Leeds United in the penultimate match of the season and despite going 1–0 down against Tottenham on the final day, came back to win 2–1 and clinch the title. Should they have failed to win, Arsenal would have been crowned champions once more.

Chelsea, looking to build on a fourth-placed finish the previous season, were flying for much of the season and were in a good position to claim a first league title in 44 years. The Blues were second at Christmas and went top on Boxing Day. A loss at Highbury at the start of February was just a second in the league all season, and kept Chelsea in second place, just a point off the summit. Eventually, three draws in April against winnable opposition (mid-table sides Middlesbrough and Leicester City, and relegation-threatened Sheffield Wednesday) ended up costing Chelsea a first Premiership crown. Had they won these, Chelseae likely would have been champions. Chelsea had to settle for third place, earning a maiden Champions League appearance.

To achieve their success, the Manchester United playing squad had been altered substantially during the close season. A total of more than £28 million had been spent on Dwight Yorke, Jaap Stam and Jesper Blomqvist, while several older players left the club; Gary Pallister returned to Middlesbrough after nine years for £2.5 million, while Brian McClair returned to Motherwell on a free transfer. In December, however, McClair was back in the Premier League as Brian Kidd's assistant at Blackburn Rovers.

== Season summary ==
At the end of 1998–99, the Premiership would have three Champions League places. Manchester United as well as runners-up Arsenal and third placed Chelsea would be playing in the following season's Champions League. There would only be one automatic UEFA Cup place from the league – taken by fourth-placed Leeds United. Fifth-placed West Ham United qualified for the UEFA Cup via the Intertoto Cup after achieving their highest league finish since 1986 as they continued to make progress under Harry Redknapp, outperforming several "bigger" clubs with greater resources. Also qualifying were Newcastle United via the 1998–99 FA Cup final, and Tottenham Hotspur via the League Cup.

Manchester United regained the title from Arsenal on the final day of the season, and had faced competition from Chelsea until the final stages of the season, while Aston Villa had led the table for much of the first half of the season before finishing sixth.

Bottom of the Premiership in the final table came Nottingham Forest, who suffered their third relegation in seven seasons. After winning two of their opening three matches, a club record winless run of 19 matches left them firmly rooted to the bottom. Another notable low during the season saw an 8-1 defeat at home to Manchester United, by which point Dave Bassett had been replaced by Ron Atkinson, who was unable to spark a revival in fortunes and their relegation back to the First Division was confirmed with three games remaining. Forest ultimately would not return to the top flight for another 23 years.

Second from bottom came Blackburn Rovers, who just four seasons earlier had been Premiership champions. Like Forest, a change of manager, with Roy Hodgson being replaced by Brian Kidd just before Christmas failed to have the desired outcome, a goalless draw at home to Manchester United in their penultimate game of the season sealing their fate. The final relegation place went to Charlton Athletic, who went down at the end of their first spell in the top flight for nine seasons following a 1-0 defeat at home to Sheffield Wednesday on the final day. The only newly promoted club to survive was Middlesbrough, who finished in ninth place - their highest final position for more than 20 years.

None of the teams relegated from the Premiership the previous season regained their top division status in 1999, although First Division champions Sunderland regained their Premiership place after a two-year exile. The other two relegation places went to long-term absentees from the top division. Playoff winners Watford regained their top division place after an absence of 11 years, but runners-up Bradford had been outside of the top division for 77 years. These two promotion winners surprised the observers more than any other Division One side during 1998–99, but were widely expected to struggle in the top flight.

== Teams ==
Twenty teams competed in the league – the top seventeen teams from the previous season and the three teams promoted from the First Division. The promoted teams were Nottingham Forest, Middlesbrough (both teams sealing an immediate return to the top flight after a single season), and Charlton Athletic (playing in the top flight after an eight-year absence). This was also Charlton Athletic's first season in the Premier League. They replaced Bolton Wanderers, Barnsley and Crystal Palace, with all three relegated teams returning to the First Division after a single season in the top flight.

=== Stadiums and locations ===
Locations of the 1998–99 Premier League teams
Greater London Premier League football clubs

Team	Location	Stadium	Capacity
Arsenal	London (Highbury)	Arsenal Stadium	38,419
Aston Villa	Birmingham	Villa Park	42,573
Blackburn Rovers	Blackburn	Ewood Park	31,367
Charlton Athletic	London (Charlton)	The Valley	20,043
Chelsea	London (Fulham)	Stamford Bridge	42,055
Coventry City	Coventry	Highfield Road	23,489
Derby County	Derby	Pride Park Stadium	33,597
Everton	Liverpool (Walton)	Goodison Park	40,569
Leeds United	Leeds	Elland Road	40,242
Leicester City	Leicester	Filbert Street	22,000
Liverpool	Liverpool (Anfield)	Anfield	45,522
Manchester United	Manchester	Old Trafford	68,174
Middlesbrough	Middlesbrough	Riverside Stadium	30,000
Newcastle United	Newcastle upon Tyne	St James' Park	52,387
Nottingham Forest	West Bridgford	City Ground	30,445
Sheffield Wednesday	Sheffield	Hillsborough Stadium	39,732
Southampton	Southampton	The Dell	15,200
Tottenham Hotspur	London (Tottenham)	White Hart Lane	36,240
West Ham United	London (Upton Park)	Boleyn Ground	35,647
Wimbledon	London (Selhurst)	Selhurst Park (Note: Due to Wimbledon lacking a home stadium, they played their home games at Selhurst Park, which is the home stadium of Crystal Palace.)	26,074

=== Personnel and kits ===
(as of 16 May 1999)

Team	Manager	Captain	Kit manufacturer	Shirt sponsor
Arsenal	(France) Arsène Wenger	(England) Tony Adams	Nike	JVC
Aston Villa	(England) John Gregory	(England) Gareth Southgate	Reebok	LDV Vans
Blackburn Rovers	(England) Brian Kidd	(England) Garry Flitcroft	Uhlsport	CIS
Charlton Athletic	(England) Alan Curbishley	(Republic of Ireland) Mark Kinsella	Le Coq Sportif	Mesh Computers
Chelsea	(Italy) Gianluca Vialli	(England) Dennis Wise	Umbro	Autoglass
Coventry City	(Scotland) Gordon Strachan	(Scotland) Gary McAllister	Le Coq Sportif	Subaru
Derby County	(England) Jim Smith	(Croatia) Igor Štimac	Puma	EDS
Everton	(Scotland) Walter Smith	(England) Dave Watson	Umbro	One2One
Leeds United	(Republic of Ireland) David O'Leary	(South Africa) Lucas Radebe	Puma	Packard Bell
Leicester City	(Northern Ireland) Martin O'Neill	(England) Steve Walsh	Fox Leisure	Walkers
Liverpool	(France) Gérard Houllier	(England) Paul Ince	Reebok	Carlsberg
Manchester United	(Scotland) Alex Ferguson	(Republic of Ireland) Roy Keane	Umbro	Sharp
Middlesbrough	(England) Bryan Robson	(Republic of Ireland) Andy Townsend	Erreà	Cellnet
Newcastle United	(Netherlands) Ruud Gullit	(England) Alan Shearer	Adidas	Newcastle Brown Ale
Nottingham Forest	(England) Ron Atkinson	(England) Steve Chettle	Umbro	Pinnacle Insurance
Sheffield Wednesday	(England) Danny Wilson	(England) Peter Atherton	Puma	Sanderson
Southampton	(England) Dave Jones	(England) Matt Le Tissier	Pony	Sanderson
Tottenham Hotspur	(Scotland) George Graham	(England) Sol Campbell	Pony	Hewlett-Packard
West Ham United	(England) Harry Redknapp	(Northern Ireland) Steve Lomas	Pony	Dr. Martens
Wimbledon	(England) Terry Burton (England) Mick Harford (caretaker)	(Jamaica) Robbie Earle	Lotto	Elonex

=== Managerial changes ===
Team	Outgoing manager	Manner of departure	Date of vacancy	Position in table	Incoming manager	Date of appointment
Sheffield Wednesday	(England) Ron Atkinson	End of caretaker spell	17 May 1998	Pre-season	(England) Danny Wilson	6 July 1998
Everton	(England) Howard Kendall	Resigned	1 July 1998	Pre-season	(Scotland) Walter Smith	1 July 1998
Liverpool	(England) Roy Evans (sole charge)	N/A (Note: Houllier joined Evans as co-manager)	1 July 1998	Pre-season	(England) Roy Evans (France) Gérard Houllier (co-managers)	1 July 1998
Newcastle United	(Scotland) Kenny Dalglish	Sacked	27 August 1998	13th	(Netherlands) Ruud Gullit	27 August 1998
Tottenham Hotspur	(Switzerland) Christian Gross	Sacked	5 September 1998	14th	(England) David Pleat (Republic of Ireland) Chris Hughton (co-caretakers)	7 September 1998
Tottenham Hotspur	(England) David Pleat (Republic of Ireland) Chris Hughton	End of caretaker spell	1 October 1998	13th	(Scotland) George Graham	1 October 1998
Leeds United	(Scotland) George Graham	Signed by Tottenham	1 October 1998	7th	(Republic of Ireland) David O'Leary	1 October 1998
Liverpool	(England) Roy Evans (as co-manager)	Resigned	12 November 1998	11th	(France) Gérard Houllier (taking sole charge)	12 November 1998
Blackburn Rovers	(England) Roy Hodgson	Sacked	21 November 1998	20th	(England) Tony Parkes (caretaker)	21 November 1998
Blackburn Rovers	(England) Tony Parkes	End of caretaker spell	4 December 1998	20th	(England) Brian Kidd	4 December 1998
Nottingham Forest	(England) Dave Bassett	Sacked	5 January 1999	20th	(England) Ron Atkinson (caretaker)	5 January 1999
Wimbledon	(Republic of Ireland) Joe Kinnear	Illness	3 March 1999 (Note: Kinnear remained contracted as manager until the season ended, and did not return to the club)	6th	(England) Terry Burton (England) Mick Harford (co-caretakers)	3 March 1999

== League table ==
Pos	Team	Pld	W	D	L	GF	GA	GD	Pts	Qualification or relegation
1	Manchester United (C)	38	22	13	3	80	37	+43	79	Qualification for the Champions League first group stage
2	Arsenal	38	22	12	4	59	17	+42	78	Qualification for the Champions League first group stage
3	Chelsea	38	20	15	3	57	30	+27	75	Qualification for the Champions League third qualifying round
4	Leeds United	38	18	13	7	62	34	+28	67	Qualification for the UEFA Cup first round
5	West Ham United	38	16	9	13	46	53	−7	57	Qualification for the Intertoto Cup third round
6	Aston Villa	38	15	10	13	51	46	+5	55	
7	Liverpool	38	15	9	14	68	49	+19	54	
8	Derby County	38	13	13	12	40	45	−5	52	
9	Middlesbrough	38	12	15	11	48	54	−6	51	
10	Leicester City	38	12	13	13	40	46	−6	49	
11	Tottenham Hotspur	38	11	14	13	47	50	−3	47	Qualification for the UEFA Cup first round (Note: Tottenham Hotspur qualified for the UEFA Cup as League Cup winners.)
12	Sheffield Wednesday	38	13	7	18	41	42	−1	46	
13	Newcastle United	38	11	13	14	48	54	−6	46	Qualification for the UEFA Cup first round (Note: As Manchester United qualified for the Champions League, their UEFA Cup place as FA Cup winners defaulted to Newcastle United, the runners-up.)
14	Everton	38	11	10	17	42	47	−5	43	
15	Coventry City	38	11	9	18	39	51	−12	42	
16	Wimbledon	38	10	12	16	40	63	−23	42	
17	Southampton	38	11	8	19	37	64	−27	41	
18	Charlton Athletic (R)	38	8	12	18	41	56	−15	36	Relegation to Football League First Division
19	Blackburn Rovers (R)	38	7	14	17	38	52	−14	35	Relegation to Football League First Division
20	Nottingham Forest (R)	38	7	9	22	35	69	−34	30	Relegation to Football League First Division

Source: Premier League
Rules for classification: 1) points; 2) goal difference; 3) number of goals scored.
(C) Champions; (R) Relegated

== Results ==
Home \ Away	ARS	AVL	BLB	CHA	CHE	COV	DER	EVE	LEE	LEI	LIV	MUN	MID	NEW	NFO	SHW	SOU	TOT	WHU	WIM
Arsenal		1–0	1–0	0–0	1–0	2–0	1–0	1–0	3–1	5–0	0–0	3–0	1–1	3–0	2–1	3–0	1–1	0–0	1–0	5–1
Aston Villa	3–2		1–3	3–4	0–3	1–4	1–0	3–0	1–2	1–1	2–4	1–1	3–1	1–0	2–0	2–1	3–0	3–2	0–0	2–0
Blackburn Rovers	1–2	2–1		1–0	3–4	1–2	0–0	1–2	1–0	1–0	1–3	0–0	0–0	0–0	1–2	1–4	0–2	1–1	3–0	3–1
Charlton Athletic	0–1	0–1	0–0		0–1	1–1	1–2	1–2	1–1	0–0	1–0	0–1	1–1	2–2	0–0	0–1	5–0	1–4	4–2	2–0
Chelsea	0–0	2–1	1–1	2–1		2–1	2–1	3–1	1–0	2–2	2–1	0–0	2–0	1–1	2–1	1–1	1–0	2–0	0–1	3–0
Coventry City	0–1	1–2	1–1	2–1	2–1		1–1	3–0	2–2	1–1	2–1	0–1	1–2	1–5	4–0	1–0	1–0	1–1	0–0	2–1
Derby County	0–0	2–1	1–0	0–2	2–2	0–0		2–1	2–2	2–0	3–2	1–1	2–1	3–4	1–0	1–0	0–0	0–1	0–2	0–0
Everton	0–2	0–0	0–0	4–1	0–0	2–0	0–0		0–0	0–0	0–0	1–4	5–0	1–0	0–1	1–2	1–0	0–1	6–0	1–1
Leeds United	1–0	0–0	1–0	4–1	0–0	2–0	4–1	1–0		0–1	0–0	1–1	2–0	0–1	3–1	2–1	3–0	2–0	4–0	2–2
Leicester City	1–1	2–2	1–1	1–1	2–4	1–0	1–2	2–0	1–2		1–0	2–6	0–1	2–0	3–1	0–2	2–0	2–1	0–0	1–1
Liverpool	0–0	0–1	2–0	3–3	1–1	2–0	1–2	3–2	1–3	0–1		2–2	3–1	4–2	5–1	2–0	7–1	3–2	2–2	3–0
Manchester United	1–1	2–1	3–2	4–1	1–1	2–0	1–0	3–1	3–2	2–2	2–0		2–3	0–0	3–0	3–0	2–1	2–1	4–1	5–1
Middlesbrough	1–6	0–0	2–1	2–0	0–0	2–0	1–1	2–2	0–0	0–0	1–3	0–1		2–2	1–1	4–0	3–0	0–0	1–0	3–1
Newcastle United	1–1	2–1	1–1	0–0	0–1	4–1	2–1	1–3	0–3	1–0	1–4	1–2	1–1		2–0	1–1	4–0	1–1	0–3	3–1
Nottingham Forest	0–1	2–2	2–2	0–1	1–3	1–0	2–2	0–2	1–1	1–0	2–2	1–8	1–2	1–2		2–0	1–1	0–1	0–0	0–1
Sheffield Wednesday	1–0	0–1	3–0	3–0	0–0	1–2	0–1	0–0	0–2	0–1	1–0	3–1	3–1	1–1	3–2		0–0	0–0	0–1	1–2
Southampton	0–0	1–4	3–3	3–1	0–2	2–1	0–1	2–0	3–0	2–1	1–2	0–3	3–3	2–1	1–2	1–0		1–1	1–0	3–1
Tottenham Hotspur	1–3	1–0	2–1	2–2	2–2	0–0	1–1	4–1	3–3	0–2	2–1	2–2	0–3	2–0	2–0	0–3	3–0		1–2	0–0
West Ham United	0–4	0–0	2–0	0–1	1–1	2–0	5–1	2–1	1–5	3–2	2–1	0–0	4–0	2–0	2–1	0–4	1–0	2–1		3–4
Wimbledon	1–0	0–0	1–1	2–1	1–2	2–1	2–1	1–2	1–1	0–1	1–0	1–1	2–2	1–1	1–3	2–1	0–2	3–1	0–0	

Source: Premier League
Legend: Blue = home team win; Yellow = draw; Red = away team win.

== Season statistics ==
=== Scoring ===
==== Top scorers ====
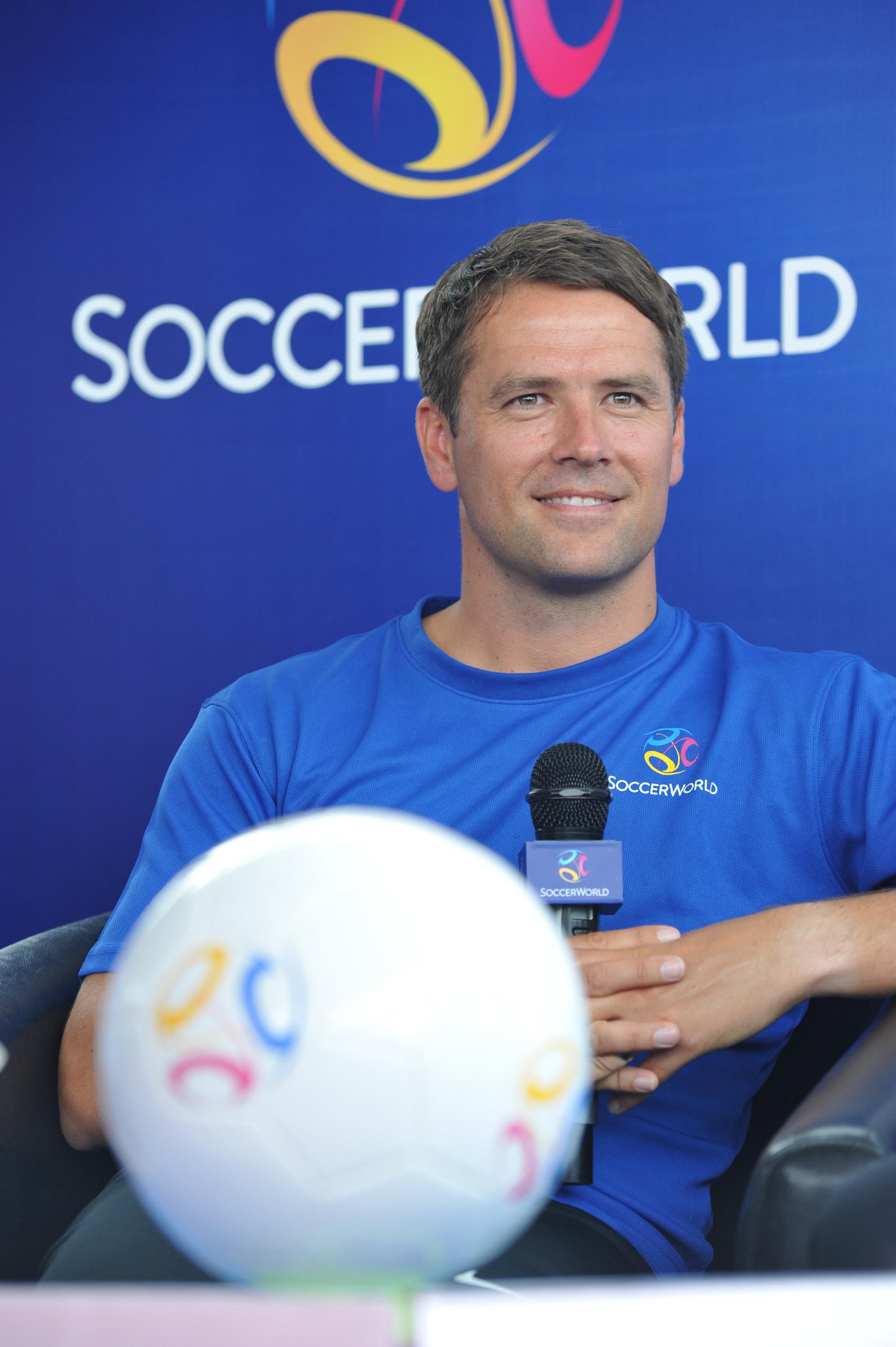
Liverpool's Michael Owen was the joint top scorer for the second time, with 18 goals.

Rank	Player	Club	Goals
1	(Netherlands) Jimmy Floyd Hasselbaink	Leeds United	18
1	(England) Michael Owen	Liverpool	18
1	(Trinidad and Tobago) Dwight Yorke	Manchester United	18
4	(France) Nicolas Anelka	Arsenal	17
4	(England) Andy Cole	Manchester United	17
6	(Colombia) Hámilton Ricard	Middlesbrough	15
7	(England) Dion Dublin	Aston Villa	14
7	(England) Robbie Fowler	Liverpool	14
7	(England) Julian Joachim	Aston Villa	14
7	(England) Alan Shearer	Newcastle United	14

==== Hat-tricks ====
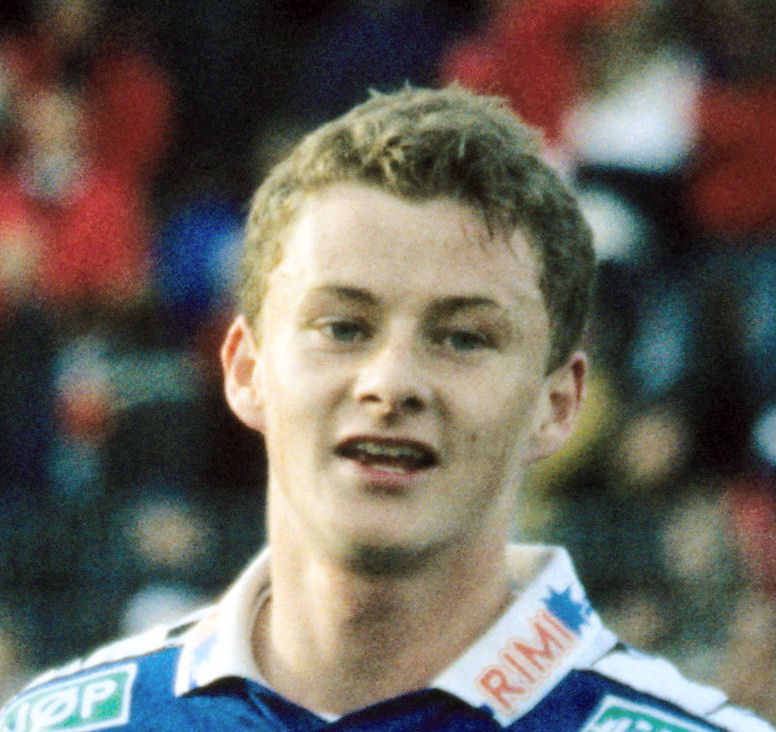
Manchester United's Ole Gunnar Solskjær became the first player to score a hat-trick as a substitute in the Premier League.

Player	For	Against	Result	Date	Ref
(England) Clive Mendonca	Charlton Athletic	Southampton	5–0 (H)	22 August 1998	
(England) Michael Owen	Liverpool	Newcastle United	4–1 (A)	30 August 1998	
(England) Michael Owen^{4}	Liverpool	Nottingham Forest	5–1 (H)	24 October 1998	
(England) Dion Dublin	Aston Villa	Leicester City	4–1 (A)	14 November 1998	
(England) Robbie Fowler	Liverpool	Aston Villa	4–2 (A)	21 November 1998	
(England) Chris Armstrong	Tottenham Hotspur	Everton	4–1 (H)	28 December 1998	
(England) Darren Huckerby	Coventry City	Nottingham Forest	4–0 (H)	9 January 1999	
(England) Robbie Fowler^{P}	Liverpool	Southampton	7–1 (H)	16 January 1999	
(Trinidad and Tobago) Dwight Yorke	Manchester United	Leicester City	6–2 (A)	16 January 1999	
(Norway) Ole Gunnar Solskjær^{4} †	Manchester United	Nottingham Forest	8–1 (A)	6 February 1999	
(France) Nicolas Anelka	Arsenal	Leicester City	5–0 (H)	20 February 1999	
(England) Kevin Campbell	Everton	West Ham United	6–0 (H)	8 May 1999	

Note: ^{4} Player scored 4 goals; ^{P} Player scored a perfect hat-trick; † Player scored hat-trick as a substitute; (H) – Home; (A) – Away

==== Top assists ====
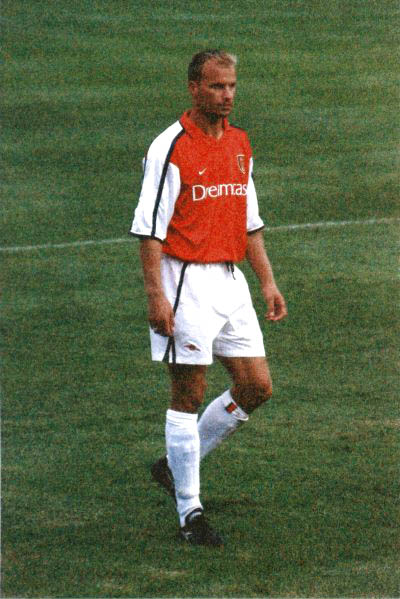
Arsenal's Dennis Bergkamp was the joint top assist provider with 13 goals for the club in the 1998–99 Premier League season.

Rank	Player	Club	Assists
1	(Netherlands) Dennis Bergkamp	Arsenal	13
1	(Netherlands) Jimmy Floyd Hasselbaink	Leeds United	13
3	(England) David Beckham	Manchester United	11
3	(Israel) Eyal Berkovic	West Ham United	11
3	(England) Steve Guppy	Leicester City	11
3	(Trinidad and Tobago) Dwight Yorke	Manchester United	11
7	(France) David Ginola	Tottenham Hotspur	10
8	(England) Darren Anderton	Tottenham Hotspur	9
8	(Australia) Harry Kewell	Leeds United	9
10	(England) James Beattie	Southampton	7

== Awards ==
=== Monthly awards ===
Month	Manager of the Month		Player of the Month	
Month	Manager	Club	Player	Club
August	(England) Alan Curbishley	Charlton Athletic	(England) Michael Owen	Liverpool
September	(England) John Gregory	Aston Villa	(England) Alan Shearer	Newcastle United
October	(Northern Ireland) Martin O'Neill	Leicester City	(Republic of Ireland) Roy Keane	Manchester United
November	(England) Harry Redknapp	West Ham United	(England) Dion Dublin	Aston Villa
December	(England) Brian Kidd	Blackburn Rovers	(France) David Ginola	Tottenham Hotspur
January	(Scotland) Alex Ferguson	Manchester United	(Trinidad and Tobago) Dwight Yorke	Manchester United
February	(England) Alan Curbishley	Charlton Athletic	(France) Nicolas Anelka	Arsenal
March	(Republic of Ireland) David O'Leary	Leeds United	(England) Ray Parlour	Arsenal
April	(Scotland) Alex Ferguson	Manchester United	(England) Kevin Campbell	Everton

=== Annual awards ===
Award	Winner	Club
Premier League Manager of the Season	(Scotland) Alex Ferguson	Manchester United
Premier League Player of the Season	(Trinidad and Tobago) Dwight Yorke	Manchester United
PFA Players' Player of the Year	(France) David Ginola	Tottenham Hotspur
PFA Young Player of the Year	(France) Nicolas Anelka	Arsenal
FWA Footballer of the Year	(France) David Ginola	Tottenham Hotspur

PFA Team of the Year
Goalkeeper	(England) Nigel Martyn (Leeds United)			
Defenders	(England) Gary Neville (Manchester United)	(England) Sol Campbell (Tottenham Hotspur)	(Netherlands) Jaap Stam (Manchester United)	(Republic of Ireland) Denis Irwin (Manchester United)
Midfielders	(England) David Beckham (Manchester United)	(France) Emmanuel Petit (Arsenal)	(France) Patrick Vieira (Arsenal)	(France) David Ginola (Tottenham Hotspur)
Forwards	(Trinidad and Tobago) Dwight Yorke (Manchester United)		(France) Nicolas Anelka (Arsenal)	

== Attendances ==
No.	Club	Matches	Total attendance	Average
1	Manchester United	19	1,048,580	55,188
2	Liverpool FC	19	823,105	43,321
3	Arsenal FC	19	722,450	38,024
4	Aston Villa	19	701,795	36,937
5	Newcastle United	19	696,631	36,665
6	Everton FC	19	687,856	36,203
7	Leeds United	19	681,056	35,845
8	Chelsea FC	19	660,273	34,751
9	Middlesbrough FC	19	653,393	34,389
10	Tottenham Hotspur	19	649,307	34,174
11	Derby County	19	554,698	29,195
12	Sheffield Wednesday	19	508,161	26,745
13	Blackburn Rovers	19	489,459	25,761
14	West Ham United	19	487,996	25,684
15	Nottingham Forest	19	463,894	24,415
16	Coventry City	19	394,791	20,778
17	Leicester City	19	388,910	20,469
18	Charlton Athletic	19	376,637	19,823
19	Wimbledon FC	19	346,468	18,235
20	Southampton FC	19	287,653	15,140
