= Elonex ONEt =

The Elonex ONEt is a netbook computer marketed to the education sector in the UK by Elonex. Inspired by the OLPC initiative, the low cost of the Elonex ONE, the ONEt and similar devices, made this subnotebook seem an attractive proposition for educators seeking to provide every child with a highly functional laptop computer. However initial ONEt trials by educators claimed that the lack of security, specifically the absence of any password protection at start-up, put personal information at risk, making it unsuitable for use in a school environment. It was released in September 2008, on sale to the general public, marketed as an upgrade to the Elonex ONE. It has Wi-Fi connectivity, a solid-state hard drive, three USB ports and an SD card slot.

== Hardware ==
The hardware specifications published on 9 July 2008:

=== Processor, Main Memory ===
- Ingenic JZ4730 JzRisc Processor (incorporates the XBurst CPU core)
- On-board 1 GB flash memory, (2 GB in t_{+} model)
- 128 MiB RAM

=== Dimensions ===
- Display: 7 in (18 cm) LCD; 800×480 px Widescreen
- Dimension (w.× l.×h.): 21 cm × 14 cm × 3 cm
- Weight: 625 g

=== Networking ===
- Wi-Fi
- Ethernet

=== Peripherals, Ports ===
- 3 USB ports
- Ethernet-over-twisted-pair network port
- 2 built-in speakers
- Audio in & out
- SD card slot

=== Battery ===
- Li ion 7.2 V 2.1 Ah - approximately 3 hours usage

=== Energy Consumption ===
- Approximately 4.5 W

== Operating System ==
The Elonex OneT has a Linux (mipsel) based operating system, and the included software comprises Sky Word (Abiword 2.4.5), Sky Table (Gnumeric 1.6.3), a PDF viewer (ePDFView 0.1.6), Scientific Calculator, Dictionary, File Manager, Web Browser (BonEcho/Firefox), Email client (Sylpheed), Sky Chatting (Pidgin), FBReader, Media Player (xine based), Xip Flash Player, Image Gallery, Paint Brush, and Sound Recorder.

Although access to the root filing system isn't possible through the included file manager it is possible to get console access as user root by installing the Xterm application from the CnM Lifestyle website. The CnM Lifestyle notebook is exactly the same as the Elonex OneT and so all applications on this page can be installed. (To browse the raw file system, the web browser will respond appropriately to being told to load file://127.0.0.1; obviously, this is read-only access.)

== Similar devices ==
The ONEt is similar to the CnM Mini-book from Maplin Electronics, Alpha 400 product from Bestlink or the Trendtac EPC 700 or the Skytone Alpha 400. Those devices are basically all the same and only have different OEM names.
