= Pasini =

Pasini is an Italian surname. Notable people with the surname include:

- Alberto Pasini (1826–1899), Italian painter
- Antonio Pasini (1770–1845), Italian painter
- Camilla Pasini (1875–1935), Italian opera singer
- Cesare Pasini (born 1950), Roman Catholic priest and Prefect of the Vatican Apostolic Library since 2007
- Claudia Pasini (1939–2015), Italian fencer
- Damien Pasini (born 1984), French racing driver
- Fabio Pasini (born 1980), Italian cross-country skier
- Humbert Francis "Pat" Pasini (1885–1964), American football, basketball, baseball, and track coach and college athletics administrator
- Lazzaro Pasini (1861–1949), Italian painter
- Carolina Pasini-Vitale (187 –1959), Italian soprano
- Mariano Pasini (born 1979), Argentine footballer
- Mattia Pasini (born 1985), Italian motorcycle racer
- Nicola Pasini (born 1991), Italian footballer
- Pace Pasini (1583–1644), Italian poet and novelist
- Renato Pasini (born 1977), Italian cross-country skier
- Timoteo Pasini (1829–1888), Italian classical composer, conductor and pianist
