= Bertuzzi =

Bertuzzi is an Italian surname that may refer to:

- Aldo Bertuzzi (born 1961), Italian racing driver
- Ercole Gaetano Bertuzzi (1668–1710), Italian painter
- Irnerio Bertuzzi (1919–1962), Italian aeroplane pilot
- Nicola Bertuzzi (died 1777), Italian Rococo painter
- Todd Bertuzzi (born 1975), Canadian hockey player
  - Todd Bertuzzi–Steve Moore incident
- Tyler Bertuzzi (born 1995), Canadian ice hockey player, nephew of Todd

== See also ==
- Bertucci
