= Stading =

Stading is a Swedish surname. Notable people with the surname include:

- Evelina Stading (1797–1829), Swedish painter
- Franziska Stading (1763–1836), Swedish opera singer
