= Bertucci =

Bertucci is a surname of Italian origin. It translates to mean peaceful communication and often refers to:

- Antonia Bertucci-Pinelli (died c. 1640), Italian painter of the Baroque era
- Bruno Bertucci (born 1990), Brazilian footballer
- Clarence V. Bertucci (died 1969), American soldier who massacred German POWs at Salina, Utah in 1945
- Francesco Antonio Bertucci (fl. 1595), Dalmatian Capuchin and Knight Hospitaller
- Giacomo Bertucci (1903–1982), Italian painter
- Giovanni Battista Bertucci (fl. early 16th century), Italian painter
- Jacopo Bertucci (fl. early 16th century), Italian painter of the Baroque era
- Javier Bertucci (born 1969), evangelical pastor, philanthropist, and Venezuelan businessman
- Jimi Bertucci (born 1951), Italian Canadian singer, songwriter, musician and composer.
- Lina Bertucci (born 1958), American photographer and film artist
- Lodovico Bertucci (fl. 17th century), Italian painter of the Baroque era
- Lucas Marcolini Dantas Bertucci, known simply as Lucas Bertucci (born 1989), Brazilian footballer
- Nicola Bertucci (c. 1710–1777), Italian painter of the late-Baroque or Rococo style
- Ughetto Bertucci (1907–1966), Italian film and stage actor
- Yves Bertucci (born 1962), French football manager
- Bertucci's, Italian restaurant chain
- Bertucci Watches, Italian-American watch brand
