= Dencik =

Dencik is a surname. Notable people with the surname include:

- Daniel Dencik (born 1972), Danish writer and film director
- David Dencik (born 1974), Swedish-Danish actor
- Lina Dencik, British social scientist
