= Linas =

Linas is a Lithuanian male given name. It is the Lithuanian form of the name Linus, which derives from the Greek for "flax". The female equivalent is Lina. Linas may refer to:

== People ==
- Linas Adomaitis (born 1976), Lithuanian musician
- Linas Alsenas (born 1979), American writer
- Linas Balčiūnas (born 1978), Lithuanian cyclist
- Linas Kleiza (born 1985), Lithuanian basketball player
- Linas Klimavičius (born 1989), Lithuanian football player
- Linas Linkevičius (born 1961), Lithuanian politician
- Linas Pilibaitis (born 1985), Lithuanian football player

== Other uses ==
- Linas, Essonne, France
- Monte Linas, Sardinia, Italy

== See also ==
- Lina
- Linas-Montlhéry
