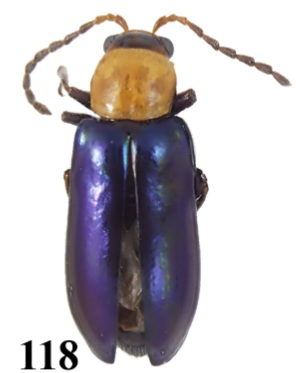

Scientific classification
- Kingdom: Animalia
- Phylum: Arthropoda
- Clade: Pancrustacea
- Class: Insecta
- Order: Coleoptera
- Suborder: Polyphaga
- Infraorder: Cucujiformia
- Family: Chrysomelidae
- Genus: Monoaster
- Species: M. fulgidus

Binomial name
- Monoaster fulgidus (Wilcox, 1965)

Synonyms
- Pseudoluperus fulgidus Wilcox, 1965

= Monoaster fulgidus =

Species of beetle

Monoaster fulgidus is a species of skeletonizing leaf beetle in the family Chrysomelidae. It is found in North America (Texas).
