= Linas-Montlhéry =

Linas and Montlhéry are two communes in the department of Essonne in France.

Linas-Montlhéry may also refer to:

- Autodrome de Linas-Montlhéry, a motor racing circuit
- ESA Linas-Montlhéry, an association football club

== See also ==
- Linas
