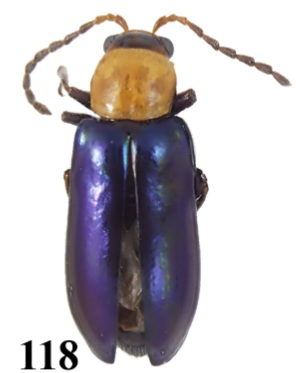

Scientific classification
- Kingdom: Animalia
- Phylum: Arthropoda
- Clade: Pancrustacea
- Class: Insecta
- Order: Coleoptera
- Suborder: Polyphaga
- Infraorder: Cucujiformia
- Family: Chrysomelidae
- Tribe: Luperini
- Subtribe: Luperina
- Genus: Monoaster; Viswajyothi & Clark, 2022

= Monoaster =

Genus of leaf beetles

Monoaster is a genus of beetles belonging to the family Chrysomelidae.

== Species ==
- Monoaster fulgidus (Wilcox, 1965)
- Monoaster linus (Wilcox, 1965)

== Etymology ==
The name Monoaster is Greek for single star. The two included species are both from Texas, nicknamed The Lone Star State.
