= Aware Electronics =

Aware Electronics Corp. is a United States of America designer and manufacturer of radiation monitors and Geiger Counters. It is located in Wilmington, Delaware and was incorporated in 1986

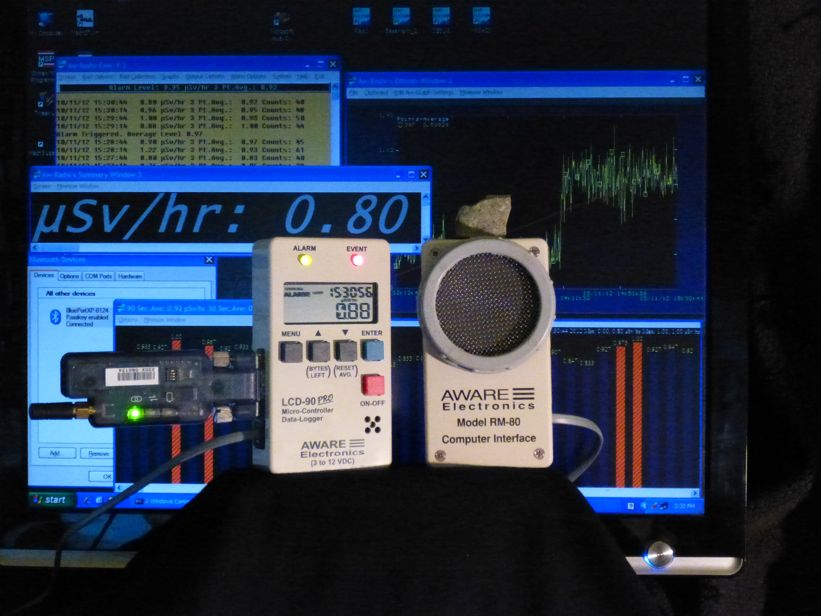
Aware's RM-80 detector with thin mica window pancake detector plugged into the LCD-90 microcontroller data-logger with Class 1 Bluetooth adapter sending radiation levels to a PC using radio signals

It produces the RM series of radiation monitors, which include the RM-60, RM-70, RM-80 and the RM-G90 Aware Electronics Corp. is notable in that it was the first company to design, manufacture and market a Geiger Counter and software specifically designed to operate with personal computers. A review of its original product, the RM-60, appeared in the November 1989 edition of PC Magazine A 1996 review of its RM-60 appeared in the June 1995 edition of Computer Life

It also produces the LCD-90 MicroController - Data Logger for use in conjunction with its radiation monitors

On 11 May 2020, AWare Electronics website appears blanked and after that points to a Japanese Company インターネットエレクトロニクス (Internet Electronics).

The remainder of this article concerns itself with Aware Electronics Inc., Ltd, a Taiwanese company, now defunct, which has no relationship what-so-ever with Aware Electronics Corp.

== Aware Electronics Inc., Ltd ==
Aware Electronics Inc., Ltd was a Taiwanese electronics manufacturer. It was established in 2006 with the guidance and assistance of the Institute for Information Industry.

It produced the A-BOOK series, which includes the A-View and AW-300 models (2008). The earlier model AW-150 was sold in the US as the MiTYBOOK.

== A-View ==
is described by Aware as An advanced digital photo frame with the features of a standard PC.

A sub-notebook similar to and probably the basis for the Elonex ONE. It seems to be a development of the similar AW-300 sub-notebook.

=== Hardware ===
- CPU: Aday5F 300 MHz X86
- Memory:
  - 128/256 MB DDR2 SDRAM
  - 4 MB Flash ROM
  - 1 GB/2 GB NAND FLASH
- Display: 800x480 7” TFT LCD
- Network interface:
  - Ethernet 10/100 Mbit/s
  - Wi-Fi 802.11b/g (optional)
  - Bluetooth (optional)
- Webcam 2.0M pixels (optional)
- USB 2.0/1.1 port X 2
- Audio jack: 3.5 mm in/out
- Battery: 3 cells, 2200mAH/cell
- Weight: 950g (with keyboard)
- Dimension(WxLxH) 230 mm x 146 mm x 33 mm(with keyboard)

== AW-300 ==
A sub-notebook similar to the A-View. The Operating system is a proprietary LINOS 2.4.25. It includes educational software, GQView, Sylpheed (email), Beaver (a text based editor), VNC and Tux Typing and games such as Xblock out, Xbomb, Xdigger, Xgalaga, Xscavenger.

=== Hardware ===
- CPU: Aday5F 300 MHz X86
- Memory:
  - 128 MB DDR2 SDRAM
  - 4 MB Flash ROM
  - 1 GB NAND Flash
- Display: 800x480 7" TFT LCD monitor
- Network:
  - 10/100 Mbit/s Ethernet
  - Wi-Fi 802.11g(optional)
  - bluetooth (optional)
- USB 2.0 ports x 6
- Audio Jack: 3.5 mm audio jack
- Volume control: volume knob
- Input： Keyboard, mouse
- Storage： USB diskdrive, Card reader

== AW-150 ==
A sub-notebook similar to, and probably the basis for, the MiTYBOOK.

=== Hardware ===
- CPU: 150 MHz X86 (possibly Aday5E)
- Memory:
  - 64 MB SDRAM
  - 4 MB Flash ROM
  - 1 GB NAND Flash
- Display: 800x480 7-inch (180 mm) TFT LCD monitor
- Network: 10/100 Mbit/s Ethernet
- USB 2.0 port x 6
- Audio Jack: 3.5 mm audio jack
- Volume control: volume knob
- Input：Keyboard, mouse
- Storage：USB diskdrive, Card reader
