= Mesh Computers =

Private computer company

PC Peripherals Ltd
- Trade name: MESH Computers
- Type: Private
- Industry: Computer hardware
- Headquarters: Staples Corner, London, United Kingdom
- Key people: Mehdi Sherafati, founder
- Products: Desktops; Media centres Laptops
- Revenue: $33,000,000 USD (2008)
- Website: meshcomputers.com

PC Peripherals Ltd, trading as MESH Computers, is a private computer hardware company based in London, England. It manufactures personal computers and sells peripherals and other components. From 1987 until 2011 it operated as MESH Computers Ltd, and the day after the company entered administration the brand name was sold and continued to operate using the same logo and website under PC Peripherals Ltd.

== History ==
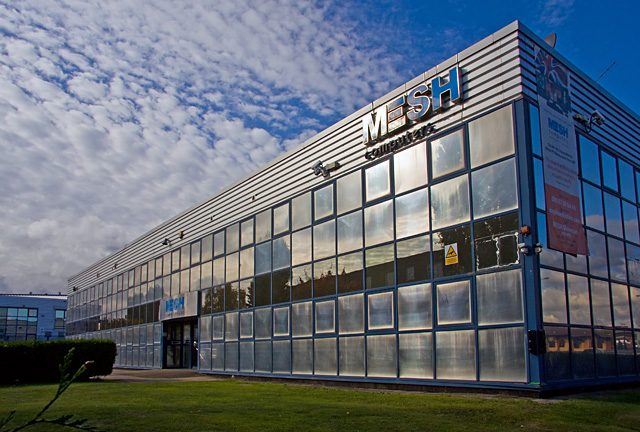
Mesh Computers head office and showroom in Staples Corner, north-west London, in 2009

MESH Computers was founded in 1987. During its first 20 years in business, computers could only be purchased directly from MESH; however, in November 2006, MESH began to sell through major retailers like Comet.

MESH Computers also sold its products to resellers in the UK such, as Ebuyer. In 2009, Mesh announced the MESH Cute home theatre PC.

The BBC created a series of programmes to teach school children about computer technology and advanced production techniques in a modern factory setting. MESH was filmed as one of the examples, alongside Rolls-Royce and Coca-Cola.

MESH was one of the last of the major UK PC manufacturers to create custom-built PCs for end users. At its peak, the mainstream market was full of local brands like Evesham Technology, Granville Technology (Tiny/Time), Elonex, Opus, Cube Enterprises, MJN and Dan; most of them shut down in the Great Recession. Viglen and RM Plc continued to operate, but specialised in education systems.

In 2010, MESH Computers was voted PC Manufacturer of the Year by both Computer Shopper magazine and the Expert Reviews website.

=== Administration in 2011 ===
On 31 May 2011, it was announced that MESH Computers had gone into administration under the law firm MacIntyre Hudson and that key assets had been bought by components firm PC Peripherals, owned by Reza Jafari. At that time, MESH had about 150 employees, and operated from Staples Corner, London.

== Continued operation of brand name ==
The "MESH Computers" brand name was sold the day following going into administration, to components distributor PC Peripherals Ltd. In February 2012, the owner of MESH (also its largest creditor) at the time it went into administration, Mehdi Sherafati, was appointed a director of PC Peripherals, effectively regaining control of the brand name.

As of 2024, the "MESH Computers" brand is still being used for selling personal computers, using the same logo and website domain name as the company used in 2011.
