= Linus (opera) =

Lost opera by Jean-Philippe Rameau

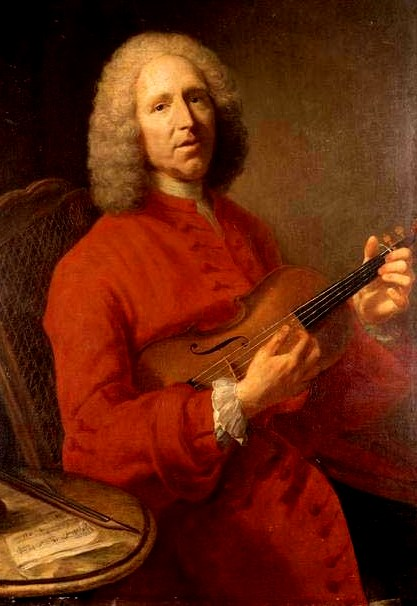
Jean-Philippe Rameau

Linus was an opera by Jean-Philippe Rameau with a libretto by Charles-Antoine Leclerc de La Bruère. For reasons which remain unclear it was never staged and the music is almost completely lost. Only two manuscript copies of the libretto and two manuscript copies of the violin part survive, one of the manuscripts contains a torn section of the score containing a recitative consisting of only 6 bars. The work takes the form of a tragédie en musique in five acts. Linus was in rehearsal in 1751 but the score was apparently stolen in confused circumstances.

== Background ==
According to Graham Sadler, La Bruère completed most of the libretto by October 1749. He initially offered it to Mondonville before handing it to Rameau in April 1750. Rameau finished the score by November and Linus went into rehearsal at the house of the Marquise de Villeroy on 10 May 1751. In Sylvie Bouissou's opinion, Rameau intended Linus as a successor to his tragédie en musique Zoroastre (1749). The revisions to the violin score suggest that the opera underwent several rehearsals. The complicated scenic effects mean it was probably destined for performance at the Paris Opéra. According to the Abbé de La Porte, the rehearsals revealed some problems with the words and music of the fifth act. Revision proved difficult as La Bruère had left for Rome; the writer Charles Collé later claimed that he wanted to take over this task. Years later, Rameau's admirer Jacques Joseph Marie Decroix wrote that the manuscript score was "lost or stolen" from the Marquise de Villeroy's house during confusion caused by an "illness" and only the part for the violin was left. The illness to which Decroix refers was probably Rameau's rather than Madame de Villeroy's as the composer is known to have been seriously indisposed in early 1751. Decroix suggested an alternative theory in which Rameau deliberately refused to stage Linus rather than compromise his artistic integrity: "Who knows if these supposed faults [in the fifth act] were not the unusual beauties of which Rameau was fond, and that the busybodies [importuns] who wanted to make him change them did not make him decide to suppress the whole opera? He was just the man to make such sacrifices."

== Later attempts to set the libretto ==
Around 1770 Antoine Dauvergne planned to set La Bruère's libretto in collaboration with Jean-Claude Trial and Pierre Montan Berton. All three composers were admirers of Rameau. Berton wrote the majority of the score. Linus was scheduled to be part of celebrations at Versailles but it was cancelled. It was rescheduled for the following year and went into rehearsal on 4 April 1771 but was never staged because of problems with the fifth act and was replaced by Monsigny's Aline, reine de Golconde. In the 1790s Berton's son Henri Montan Berton made another attempt at setting the libretto but this version never saw the light of day. In 2018, the German composer and musicologist Klaus Miehling newly composed the opera in Rameau's style, using the preserved violin part.

== Roles ==
Roles
Role
Linus, son of Apollo
Cléonice, Queen of Thebes
Gélanor, Prince of Thrace
Théano, his sister, an enchantress
Argénis, confidante of Cléonice
Apollo
Un Plaisir (pleasure genius)
A Shepherd
A Shepherdess
A Nereid
Le Soleil

== Synopsis ==
=== Act 1 ===
By the Temple of Apollo, Queen Cléonice of Thebes confesses her love for Linus to her confidante. Linus, the son of Apollo, is also secretly in love with the queen. Linus is due to lead a festival in which the queen will name the man she intends to marry. Gélanor, Prince of Thrace, arrives with his warriors. He hopes to win Cléonice's hand but she rebuffs him and he swears revenge. Cléonice and Linus declare their love for each other.

=== Act 2 ===
Gélanor complains of his rejection to his sister, the enchantress Théano. She is in love with Linus so she willingly agrees to join her brother in his vengeance on Cléonice. She causes a violent storm to interrupt the ceremony in which Cléonice is due to announce the name of her future husband. Linus is abducted by four demons while Gélanor and his warriors take advantage of the confusion to defeat the Thebans and take Cléonice prisoner.

=== Act 3 ===
The storm cloud transports Linus to a wild forest, which magically changes into a beautiful garden. Théano arrives in a chariot pulled by dragons and begs Linus to abandon his love for Cléonice. She uses her powers to show him Gélanor on the throne of Thebes and Cléonice imprisoned in a tower. Linus rejects Théano's love and vows to rescue Cléonice. In her anger, Théano causes the garden to burst into flames but Linus prays to Apollo and the god extinguishes the fire.

=== Act 4 ===
A group of the queen's followers have managed to free Cléonice and she is reunited with Linus. Linus builds a hiding place in the forest as the local shepherds celebrate the lovers. Venus sends blacksmiths to protect Cléonice by offering her arms against Gélanor.

=== Act 5 ===
Gélanor has defeated Linus and his army. Cléonice dissuades her lover from committing suicide and the two embark for the island of Delos. Théano conjures a tempest to destroy their ship, but the storm causes a huge wave which sweeps Théano and Gélanor to their deaths. The scene changes to the palace of Thetis, who welcomes Cléonice and Linus whom she has saved from the shipwreck. Apollo appears and unites the lovers in marriage and the opera ends in celebration.

== Sources ==
- Bouissou, Sylvie Jean-Philippe Rameau: Musicien des lumières (Fayard, 2014)
- Girdlestone, Cuthbert, Jean-Philippe Rameau: His Life and Work, New York: Dover, 1969 (paperback edition)
- Sadler, Graham The Rameau Compendium (Boydell Press, 2014)
