= Evelina Tshabalala =

South African marathon runner and mountaineer

Evelina Tshabalala (born 1965), a South African marathon runner and mountaineer, has climbed Aconcagua and Mount Kilimanjaro, despite being infected with the AIDS virus.
