= Linus Airways =

Regional airline in Indonesia

IATA	ICAO	Call sign
-	LAI	AIRLINUS
- Founded: 2008
- Ceased operations: May 2009
- Hubs: Soekarno-Hatta International Airport
- Focus cities: Semarang, Medan, Batam, Bandung
- Fleet size: 2
- Destinations: 6
- Headquarters: Jakarta
- Key people: Julius Indra (CEO)
- Website: http://www.linusairways.com/

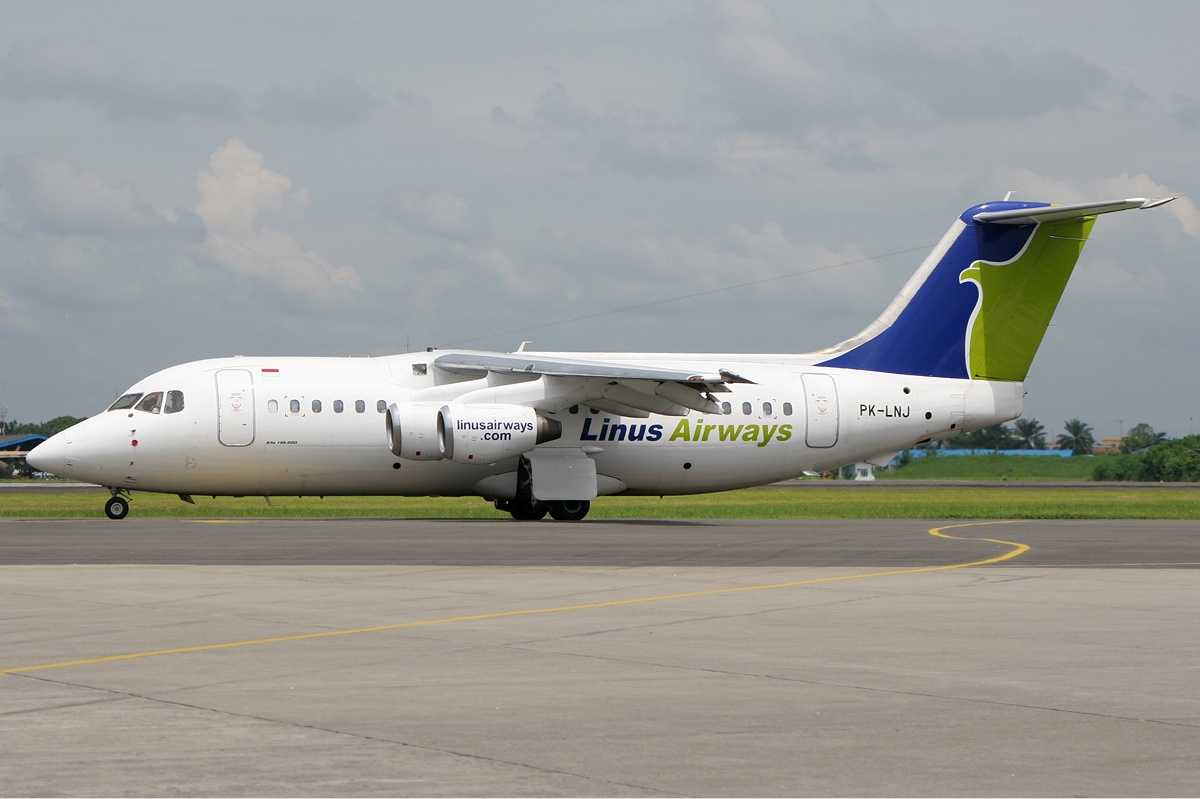
Linus Airways BAe 146-200 PK-LNJ

Linus Airways was a regional airline in Indonesia. It served large city destinations, such as Pekanbaru, Medan, Semarang, Palembang, Batam and Bandung. The airline name is an abbreviation of "Lintasan Nusantara" ("bridge across the archipelago").

Founded in 2004 and started operations in 2008, the airline started operation just one month after the demise of Adam Air, which was heavily embroiled in corruption and safety violations which caused financial problems and ceased operation in that year due to many accidents or incidents. Linus officially started operation from Jakarta to Batam in July 2008.

The airline was on the List of air carriers banned in the European Union. Linus Airways is not listed in any category by the Indonesian Civil Aviation Authority for airline safety quality, because this airline is no longer operating.

In May 2009, the airline decided to suspend all of its operations due to financial problems.

== Fleet ==
As of 2008, Linus Airways operated the following aircraft:

- 2 BAe 146-200

=== Historical fleet ===
- 1 Boeing 737-200
