= Jacopo Bertucci =

Italian painter

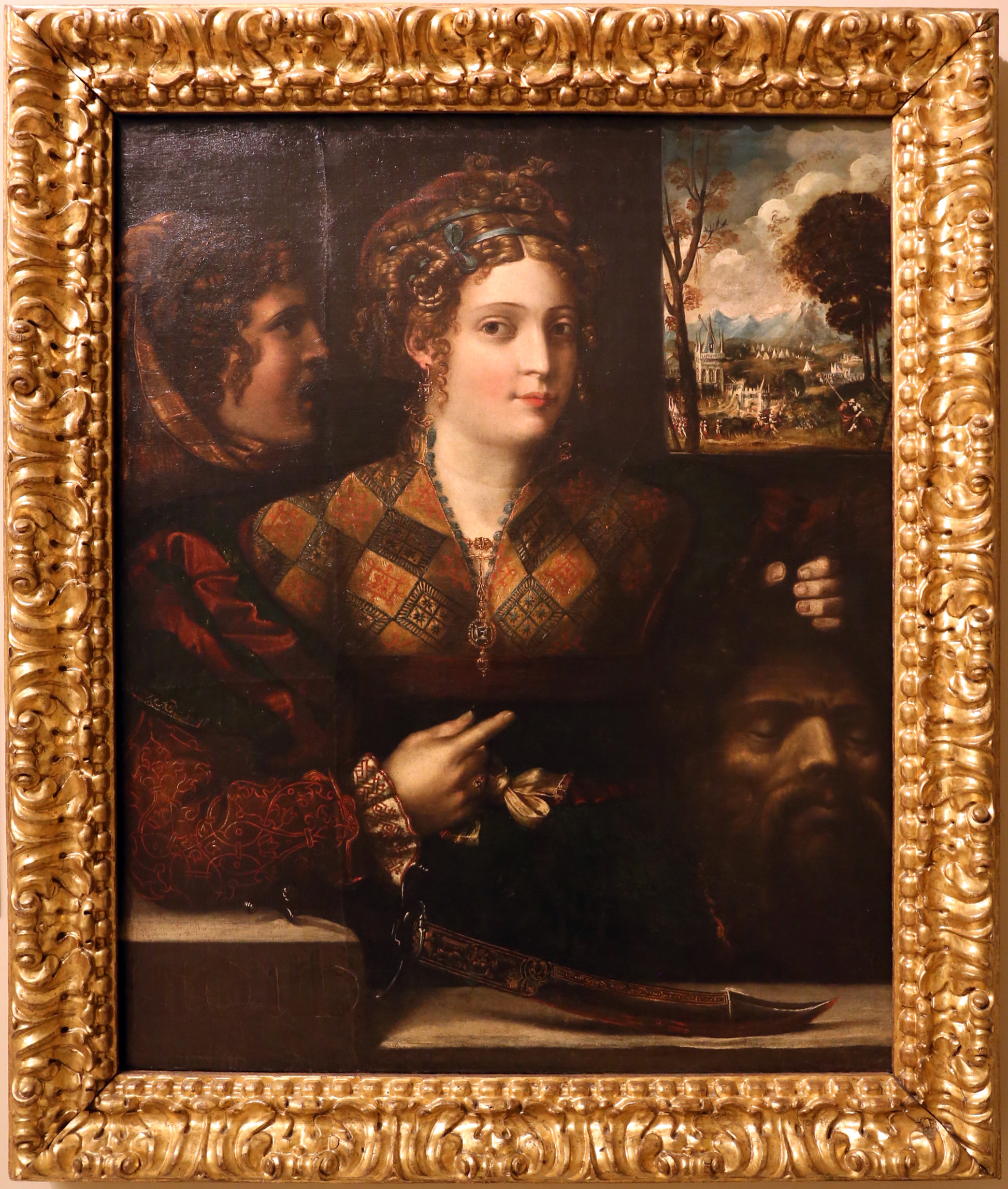
Judith and Holofernes, Galleria Estense

Jacopo Bertucci (active first half 16th century) was an Italian painter of the Renaissance period. He is also known as Jacopone da Faenza. He was born in Faenza, and worked under Raphael in Rome. One of his pupils was Taddeo Zuccari. He was active c. 1530 and painted in the manner of Raphael. He painted for the church of San Vitale at Ravenna.

Corrado Ricci calls him Giacomo Bartuzzi (circa 1501–1579), while others use the surname Bertuzzi.
