= Florence Lina Mouissou =

Florence Lina Mouissou (sometimes Florence Lina Bamona-Mouissou) is a novelist from the Republic of Congo, currently living in Paris, France.

== Early life ==
Mouissou was born in 1972. After completing her primary and secondary schooling at Pointe-Noire, she travelled to Paris to study literature. She also received a screenwriting diploma from Cinécours in Quebec.

== Published works ==
- Le plus vieux métier du monde. Nice: Editions Bénévent, 2005. ISBN 2 84871 954 0.
- Le Destin d'Aminata. Paris: L'Harmattan, 2009. ISBN 978-2-296-08388-2.
