= Lino (footballer, born 1971) =

Brazilian footballer

Personal information
- Full name: Elinaldo da Silva Lira
- Date of birth: 1 November 1971 (age 54)
- Place of birth: Maceió, Brazil
- Height: 1.64 m (5 ft 5 in)
- Position: Midfielder

Senior career*
Years	Team	Apps	(Gls)
1997	Social		
1997–1998	Salgueiros		
2003	CRB		
2004	CSA		
2005	Corinthians Alagoano		
2006	Bom Jesus		
2007	Baraúnas		
- * Club domestic league appearances and goals

Elinaldo da Silva Lira, known as Lino (born 1 November 1971) is a retired Brazilian football midfielder.
