= Linos (given name) =

Linos is a masculine given name. Notable people with the name include:

- Linos Chalwe (born 1980), Zambian footballer
- Linos Chrysikopoulos (born 1992), Greek basketball player
- Linos Makwaza (born 1965), Zambian footballer
