= Lina Eve =

Australian artist

Lina Eve is an Australian artist, adoption activist, singer/songwriter, photographer and filmmaker.

== Life and work ==
Lina Eve was born in Germany to Polish parents. Her father was a Holocaust survivor, and, to escape war torn Europe, the family immigrated to Australia in 1951. At 17 years old, pregnant and unmarried, she lost her first child to forced adoption in 1964.

Eve travelled back to Europe where she worked on a kibbutz in Israel; as a folk-singer in London; as a model in Greece and Paris; and as a silversmith, travelling overland between Europe and the East. In Australia she has worked as a singer/songwriter, photographer, visual artist, and as a filmmaker.

Eve started painting in 1994 studying Fine Arts at Southern Cross University, in Lismore, NSW, and sold her first paintings in the same year. Her paintings have been selling locally, nationally and internationally ever since. Her Bad Girl series, music, and videos have enhanced her activism in adoption reform and, along with her Holocaust series, Reclaiming my Family History, have led to recognition in Australia, the United States and Europe.

After venturing into the world of filmmaking, she won the Best Australian Music Video Award at the WOW Film Festival in Sydney in 2009, for Bitter Wind.

== Exhibitions ==
Solo exhibitions

- “Bad Girl” & “People and Places” Roxy Gallery Kyogle Feb 2008
- Mental Health Conference, Liverpool Sydney, 2002
- “Tributes” Upstairs Gallery, Lismore. Jan 18- Feb 18, 1999
- “Reclaiming my Family History” Roxy Gallery, Kyogle. Nov. 21, 1997.

Group exhibitions

- “Bad Girl Series” Black Mountain Clubhouse, NC. USA 2005
- “Neurotic Visionaries & Paranoid Jews” Makor, NYC, NY, USA April 2005
- “SAGAS” (Secret Adoption Grief Art Show) New Jersey, USA 2000
- “SAGAS” Washington, USA 2000
- Bastard Nation Conference in Atlantic City USA. 1999
- “The Holocaust through the Eyes of the Artist”
- Wilshire Boulevard Temple, LA, USA, Sept. 1999
- Mental Health Conference, Wacol, QLD, 2004
- “Yesterday, Today and Tomorrow” Lismore Regional Gallery Feb, 2003
- “The Poetics of Survival” with Bonney Bombach, Gold Coast Gallery, 1999
- “Faces” Exhibition, Upstairs Gallery, Lismore.
- Women Artist’s Diary Exhibition, Waywood Gallery, 1998
- “Guava Jelly Show”, Coldstream Yamba. 1997
- Portrait Exhibition, Coldstream Yamba.1997
- “Cultural Alternatives” Roxy Gallery Kyogle 1997.
- Women Artist’s Diary Exhibition, Brooklet House, 1997
- “In Focus” Photographic Exhibition, Roxy Gallery Kyogle, Oct. 17, 1997.
- Southern Cross University Graduation Show. 1996
- Lismore Regional Gallery.1996
- “The Painter’s Exhibition”, Chocolate Factory, Lismore.1996
- Bare Bones Gallery, Group shows, Bangalow. 1996 & 1997
- Epicenter, Byron Bay.1996
- Stanthorpe Regional Gallery. 1996
- Southern Cross University Museum, 1996
- Trinity Arts Festival, Lismore.1996

== Prizes ==
- Winner Best Australian Music Video “Bitter Winds” WOW film festival Sydney 2009
- 1st prize photography Bentley Art Show. 1997.
- First Prize, Ilford Photographic Competition for 3rd Year Tertiary Students, 1998
- First Prize for Photography, Bentley Art Show. 1998.
- First Prize, Ilford Photographic Competition for 2nd Year Tertiary Students, 1997
- Third Prize, Ilford Photographic Competition for 3rd Yr Tertiary Students, 1996
- WA. Finalist Mandorla Art Prize, New Norcia Gallery, 1996
