= Camilla Pasini =

Italian operatic soprano

- Born: November 6, 1875
- Died: November 29, 1935 (aged 60)
- Genres: Opera
- Instrument: Singer soprano
- Years active: c. 1895 – c. 1920

Camilla Pasini (6 November 1875 – 29 November 1935) was an Italian operatic soprano. Her sister Lina Pasini-Vitale was a well known Wagnerian soprano and her other sister, Enrica Pasini, had a short career as an operatic mezzo-soprano. Pasini studied at the Accademia Nazionale di Santa Cecilia in Rome and made her professional opera debut in that city at the Teatro Quirino as Inez in Meyerbeer's L'Africaine. She most notably originated the role of Musetta in the original 1896 production of Puccini's La bohème at the Teatro Regio in Turin. She also sang that role at numerous other theaters including La Scala, the Teatro Costanzi in Rome, and in Brescia, Genoa, Trieste, and Asti among others. In 1904, Pasini traveled to South America where she performed on tour in many countries and cities. In 1905, Pasini married a lawyer with the surname of Muzi and promptly gave up her career for the next six years. She returned to the stage in 1911 in the premiere of the opera La Vigilia di Notte by Teofilo De Angelis at the Teatro Costanzi. She retired from the operatic stage somewhere around 1920.

Pasini spent almost her entire career in Italy. She performed in most of Italy's major opera houses including the Teatro Rossetti in Trieste, at the Teatro Massimo in Palermo, and at the Teatro Comunale Fiume in Padua, Cremona, Milan and Rome.

Among the many roles she portrayed are Violetta in Verdi's La traviata, Desdemona in Verdi's Otello, Norina in Donizetti's Don Pasquale, the title role in Puccini's Tosca, Margherita in Boito's Mefistofele, the title role in Umberto Giordano's Fedora, the title role in Alfredo Catalani's La Wally, the title role in Catalani's Loreley, Suzel in Pietro Mascagni's L'amico Fritz, Elsa in Wagner's Lohengrin, and the title role in Jules Massenet's Grisélidis.

== Sources ==
- Camilla Pasini biography from Operissimo.com (In German)
- Laura Williams Macy - The Grove Book of Opera Singers
