= Wang Lina =

Wang Lina may refer to:

- Wang Lina (actress) (born 1999), Chinese actress and singer
- Wang Lina (boxer) (born 1997), Chinese boxer
- Wang Lina (long jumper) (born 1983), Chinese long jumper
- Wang Lina (sport shooter) (born 1971), Chinese pistol shooter
- Wang Lina (volleyball) (born 1978), Chinese volleyball team outside hitter
