= Lina Penna Sattamini =

Brazilian interpreter and mother

Lina Penna Sattamini is a Brazilian interpreter and mother who was living and working in the United States in the 1960s when her son was kidnapped and tortured by members of Brazil’s military regime. Sattamini and her family fought passionately and fiercely to have her son released from prison. In Brazil in 2000, she published A Mother’s Cry, a memoir of her family’s struggle. The book was translated and published in the United States in 2010.

== Early life ==
Sattamini was married to Clemildo Lyra de Arruda. The couple had five children: Marcos, Christiana, Miguel, Martinha, and Mônica.

In 1958, following a difficult separation from Celemildo Lyra de Arruda, Sattamini moved to the United States, seeking a life of personal and economic independence. When Sattamini got to the United States, she taught herself English and began working as an interpreter for USAID.

== Fight for the release of her son ==
On May 20, 1970 Sattamini received word from her mother in Rio that her twenty-nine-year-old son, Marcos Arruda, had been arrested. Marcos had been arrested by the OBAN (Operation Banderantes), an arm of the Brazilian military aimed at arresting terrorists, on his way to meet a woman for lunch in São Paulo on May 11, 1970. There was no record of his imprisonment for twenty-four days. While in custody of the OBAN, Marcos was badly tortured. He was then moved to a military hospital, where his captors alternated between interrogating him and giving him medical treatment.

After a period of silence, the family finally learned that Marcos was being held in the Second Army Military Hospital. Initially, they were not permitted to see Marcos. Sattamini stayed in the United States for fear that she wouldn’t be able to do anything to help if she were in Rio. But in August when they learned that Marcos’ health was “extremely precarious,” Lina immediately flew to Brazil. When she reached São Paulo, Sattamini hired young lawyer Técio Lins e Silva to represent Marcos. With the guidance of Lins e Silva, Sattamini fought to be allowed to communicate with her son. When she finally received permission to visit him, she was overwhelmed with pain and joy. Her son was physically deformed, and his body was shaking involuntarily and violently.

Sattamini began a long campaign to get Marcos released. She visited the offices of the Minister of Justice and the Minister of the Army and met with the secretary to the Justice Minister, pleading for her son to at least be transferred from São Paulo to Rio to be closer to family. By August 24, Marcos had been successfully transferred to Rio, when Octávio Medieros (friend of Sattamini’s mother, secretary to President Emílio Garrastazu Médici) recommended Marcos’ transfer to high officials within the Ministry of War.

By the end of August 1970, Sattamini returned to the United States to work. The trips to São Paulo and the international phone calls (more than $200 a month) were very expensive, and Sattamini had to work hard to help cover the expenses. In the United States, Sattamini continued to fight for her son. She began contacting international organizations, like London-based Amnesty International, Organization of American States (OAS), the United Nations and International Commission of Jurists in Switzerland.

Sattamini was working as a freelance interpreter for OAS, attending meetings of the Inter-American Commission on Human Rights, while simultaneously receiving responses to her pleas for help from the OAS and the UN saying that they were sorry, but were unable to interfere in the internal affairs of the country. However, she did receive a positive response from Amnesty International. On October 15, Sattamini received a letter from a group of volunteers in Philadelphia, who joined the fight to help Marcos. The 14-member group bombarded the Brazilian government with letters about Marcos’ case. The letter-writing campaign, resulted in a response from a general saying that Marcos was being detained for subversion. This was the first piece of evidence from the Brazilian government of detainment. Técio used this document to start a legal case for Marcos.

Sattamini had a green card to be in the United States, and was in the process of becoming a naturalized citizen. But, by the fall of 1970, she wrote a letter to Virginia Congressman Joel T. Broyhill to help her expedite the process. With his help and the help of her sponsor Tom Doherty, she became a US citizen. By the end of November, with her new American passport, Sattamini was able to travel to Brazil again. She resigned from her job with USAID, and gave up her apartment in Washington to return to Brazil to fight for her son’s release.

When she reached Rio, she went to the American embassy and spoke with the Consul General about Marcos’ situation. She also spoke with the Archbishop of Rio de Janeiro, Dom Aloísio Lorshcheider, and public relations officers at the Ministry of War, and family friend Colonel Octavio Mederios. As a result, Mederios’s mother called Sattamini’s mother and told her that Marcos would be home by Christmas. However, by the time Christmas rolled around, they received word that Marcos was at the hospital again and would not be coming home. The family was told that because of the kidnapping of the German Ambassador, they would not be able to visit Marcos. When the family relayed that information to Colonel Mederios, he was shocked and had no idea that Marcos wasn’t released by Christmas.

On January 28, 1971, Sattamini wrote a letter claiming that she was going on a hunger strike to protest the imprisonment and torture of her son. She gave the Brazilian government an ultimatum—she would send the letter to every international organization and religious institution if Marcos wasn’t released within the next five days. On February 1, 1971, Marcos was released.

== Return to the United States ==
As soon as Marcos was set free, Sattamini began trying to persuade him to go with her to the United States. He was very hesitant to leave Brazil, but when Técio learned that the authorities were going to try and arrest Marcos again, he agreed to leave the country. The next day, Sattamini visited the Consul and asked for a visa for Marcos, which was immediately issued. On May 8, 1971, Sattamini and her son boarded a plane for the United States.

Marcos spent his time in Washington reading and walking, as well as speaking out against the Brazilian dictatorship. In September 1971, The Washington Post interviewed Marcos and released an editorial denouncing torture in Brazil. Later that fall, Marcos and Sattamini learned that there would be an official meeting between President Médici and President Richard Nixon in December. Marcos and Sattamini, along with members of the CARIB (Committee Against Repression in Brazil), and the theatre group Earth Onion mobilized to protest. They took pictures of Marcos stimulating torture and created a slideshow. When Médici reached the White House, the group held a demonstration in Lafayette Square, holding posters denouncing the dictatorship and showing the slideshow. Meanwhile, in Brazil, Técio continued working on Marcos’ case and on June 6, 1972 Marcos was acquitted. In 1979, after eight years of exile, Marcos was able to return home.

== Fight against historical amnesia ==
Sattamini returned to Rio, where she owns an apartment downstairs from her son Marcos. When Brazilians in the 1990s suggested that society should forget and move on from the era of political repression and torture, Sattamini protested and began working on a memoir that detailed her family’s experiences. In 2000, she published A Mother’s Cry in Brazil. In 2010, the text was published in the United States, edited with an introduction by James Green, and an epilogue by her son Marcos. The book was translated into English by Rex P. Nielson and James Green and published by Duke University Press. The book tells the story of the suffering that Marcos went through because of his actions against the military dictatorship as well as how Sattamini’s family fought to save Marcos’ life.
