= Lina Fruzzetti =

American anthropologist and documentary filmmaker

Lina Fruzzetti is an American cultural anthropologist and documentary filmmaker. Since 1975, she has been a professor of anthropology at Brown University in the United States. Apart from having published ethnographic studies about rural communities and gender relations in East Africa, India and Tanzania, she is the author of several ethnographic films. These films were written and co-directed with her husband, Ákos Östör, cultural anthropologist and professor emeritus of anthropology at Wesleyan University. Since 2016 Fruzzetti is also a Fellow at the Jawaharlal Nehru University Institute for Advanced Studies (JNIAS) in New Delhi, India.

== Ethnographic films ==
Fruzzetti's ethnographic films include Seed and Earth (1994), Fishers of Dar (2002), Singing Pictures (2005), Songs of a Sorrowful Man (2009) and In My Mother's House (2016). Singing Pictures, distributed by Documentary Educational Resources, won an award at the XV International Festival of Ethnological Film (Belgrade November 1–5, 2006).

== Academic publications ==
- Culture and change along the Blue Nile : courts, markets, and strategies for development Boulder : Westview Press, 1990. xxi, 230 p. : ill.; 22 cm. ISBN 0-8133-7788-9
- The gift of a virgin : women, marriage, and ritual in a Bengali society New Brunswick, N.J. : Rutgers University Press, c1982. xi, 178 p. : ill.; 24 cm. ISBN 0-8135-0939-4
- Kinship and ritual in Bengal : anthropological essays / Lina Fruzzetti, Akos Ostor. New Delhi : South Asian Publishers, c1984. x, 244 p.; 23 cm.
- Concepts of Person. Kinship, Caste, and Marriage in India. Akos Östör, Lina Fruzzetti and S. Barnett (ed.). Harvard University Press, 1982.

== Related filmmakers ==
- John Marshall (filmmaker)
- Robert Gardner
- Tim Asch
