= Hellinsia linus =

Scientific classification
- Domain: Eukaryota
- Kingdom: Animalia
- Phylum: Arthropoda
- Class: Insecta
- Order: Lepidoptera
- Family: Pterophoridae
- Genus: Hellinsia
- Species: H. linus

Binomial name
- Hellinsia linus (Barnes & Lindsey, 1921)

Synonyms
- Oidaematophorus linus Barnes & Lindsey, 1921

Species of plume moth

Hellinsia linus is a moth of the family Pterophoridae first described by William Barnes and Arthur Ward Lindsey in 1921. It is found in North America, including Pennsylvania, Ohio, Maryland and Massachusetts.

The wingspan is 21–22 millimetres (0.83–0.87 in). It is predominantly white. There are some gray-brown scales on the head above and in front. The antennae are dotted with brown above. The forewings are white, more or less heavily irrorated with brownish-black scales which are more numerous toward the inner margin and apices of the lobes. There is a dark dash at the costa over the base of cleft and another beyond the middle of the first lobe. The fringes are brownish gray with whitish pencils at the tips of the veins of the second lobe and one before the apex of the first. The hindwings and their fringes are brownish gray.
