= Lino =

Lino may refer to:

- Lino, short for linoleum, a common flooring material
- Lino, slang for linesman, the former name (still in widespread common use) for an assistant referee in association football

== People ==
=== Nickname ===
- Lee Know, member of South Korean boy band Stray Kids

=== Given name ===
- Lino (footballer, born 1971), Brazilian footballer
- Lino (footballer, born 1976), Guinea-Bissauan footballer
- Lino (footballer, born 1977), Brazilian footballer
- Lino (rapper), French rapper; part of the rap duo Ärsenik
- Lino Cayetano, Filipino politician
- Lino DiSalvo, American animator and director
- Lino Donoso (1922–1990), Cuban baseball player
- Lino Facioli, Brazilian actor
- Lino Gutierrez (1951–2025), American diplomat and ambassador
- Lino Lacedelli (1925–2009), Italian mountaineer
- Lino Rulli, American talk radio host
- Lino Saputo, Canadian businessman and founder of the Canadian-based cheese manufacturer Saputo, Inc.
- Lino Sousa Loureiro, 2025 Mulhouse stabbing attack victim
- Lino Tagliapietra, glass artist
- Lino Urdaneta (born 1979), Venezuelan baseball player
- Lino Ventura, an Italian actor who starred in French movies

=== Surname ===
- Marisa Lino, American diplomat
- Pascal Lino, a French former road racing cyclist
- Paulo Rui Lino Borges (born 1971), Portuguese footballer known as Lino
- Samuel Lino, Brazilian footballer

== Politics ==
- Libertarian In Name Only
- Liberal In Name Only
- Labour In Name Only
