= Elonex ONE =

Netbook computer

The Elonex ONE (also known as ONE) was a netbook computer marketed to the education sector by Elonex. The ONE's operating system was called Linos, based on Linux kernel 2.6.21, and the device had Wi-Fi connectivity, Ethernet networking, a solid-state hard drive, two USB ports and weighed less than 1 kg.

The ONE was described by Elonex at the time as the cheapest laptop in the UK at a retail price of £99 in the UK. Its official unveiling took place on 28 February 2008 at The Education Show at the NEC in Birmingham and a shipping date of June 2008 was announced. Customer deliveries started in August 2008.

In February 2008, Elonex stated their vision was for "every pupil to have their own laptop" to "improve computer literacy across the nation". Elonex aligned the cost of the ONE with the aims of the DCSF closing the achievement gap between those from low-income and disadvantaged backgrounds and their peers. To support this initiative Elonex committed to "donate 1 ONE to underprivileged children from disadvantaged areas for every hundred sold".

== Hardware ==
The hardware specifications were published on 28 February 2008. The "LNX Code 8" is also the CPU used in the Elonex One+, One T, and One T+ ultra-low-cost notebook computers. While Elonex declined to release information on the designer and manufacturer of the processor, Engadget reported that the One could be a rebranded Fontastic A-View laptop, which would make the processor an x86-compatible 300 MHz Aday5F.

=== Processor, main memory ===
- LNX Code 8 Mobile 300 MHz Processor
- Dedicated Linux Memory 128 MB DDR-II SD RAM (256 MB in upgraded model)
- On-board 1 GB Flash Memory, optimised for Linux (2 GB in upgraded model)
- Removable 1 GB, 2 GB, 4 GB, 8 GB, 16 GB wristvault (sold separately)

=== Dimensions, casing ===
- Display: 7 inch (18 cm) High Resolution TFT LCD; 800 x 480px Widescreen
- Dimension: 22 cm x 15 cm x 3 cm (W x L x H)
- Weight: 0.95 kg
- Interchangeable Outer Rubberised Skin (Optional)
- Splash-proof, removable QWERTY keyboard

=== Networking ===
- Wi-Fi 802.11b/g (Wireless) (54 Mbit/s)
- Ethernet (Wired) (10/100 Mbit/s)
- Bluetooth (Wireless) in upgraded model

=== Peripherals, ports ===
- 2 USB 2.0 ports
- 2 built-in speakers
- 3.5 mm audio-in/mic
- 3.5 mm headphones
- 2 Mouse emulators (one on keyboard and one on rear of device, advertised as for Tablet use)

=== Power ===
- Integrated 3 cell Battery – approximately 4 hours usage
- Power adapter

== Operating system ==
- Linux – Linos 2.6.21 operating system, with pre-installed software bundle

== Similar devices ==
The ONE is similar to the A-View or AW-300 A-BOOK products from Aware. They use an Aday 5F-300 MHz X86 processor. An earlier Aware product the AW-150 is sold in the US for $199 as the MiTYBOOK.

Elonex revealed further notebook models at Computex in June 2008. Elonex introduced the One successor at IFA 2009. It's a smartbook based on ARM 11 CPA and Windows CE OS.
