= Lina (surname) =

Lina is a surname. Notable people with the surname include:

- Alberto Lina (1948–2025), Filipino businessman and government official
- Dace Lina (born 1981), Latvian marathon runner
- Joey Lina (born 1951), Filipino lawyer, businessman, and politician
- Méddy Lina (born 1986), Guadeloupean footballer
- Ria Lina (born 1989), British comedian, actress, and writer
