= Linos (operating system) =

Embedded Linux distribution by Aware Electronics

Linos is an embedded distribution of Linux with proprietary applications used by Aware Electronics in their A-BOOK products. It can only be obtained by purchasing a device containing the runtime code. It is used in the Elonex ONE.
