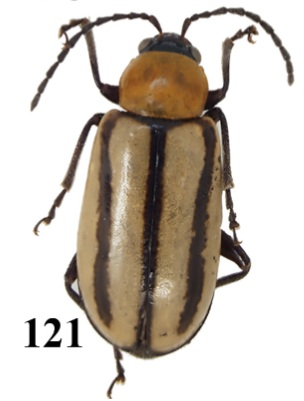

Scientific classification
- Kingdom: Animalia
- Phylum: Arthropoda
- Clade: Pancrustacea
- Class: Insecta
- Order: Coleoptera
- Suborder: Polyphaga
- Infraorder: Cucujiformia
- Family: Chrysomelidae
- Genus: Monoaster
- Species: M. linus

Binomial name
- Monoaster linus (Wilcox, 1965)

Synonyms
- Pseudoluperus linus Wilcox, 1965

= Monoaster linus =

Species of beetle

Monoaster linus is a species of beetle of the family Chrysomelidae. It is found in North America (Texas).
