= Evelina Puzaitė =

Lithuanian musician

- Born: Evelina Puzaitė; 1982 (age 43–44)
- Genres: Classical music
- Occupation: Musician
- Instrument: Piano

Evelina Puzaite (born 1982) is a Lithuanian classical pianist, composer, writer, and supporter of Baltic music.

== Early life and education ==
Evelina was born in Vilnius in Lithuania, and was first taught piano by her mother Irena. Evelina made her concert debut as a pianist aged 6, and in the same year secured a place to study at the National M. K. Čiurlionis School of Art under Jurate Karosaitė. Aged 18 she won a full scholarship to study at the Guildhall School in London under Joan Havill.

== Career ==
Puzaitė has won prizes at 12 international piano competitions including First Prize at the Rubinstein Piano Competition in Paris (1997), Second Prize in the International Competition of Belgrade, Serbia (1997), First Prize in Tel-Hai International Piano Competition, Israel (1999), Third Prize in M.K. Čiurlionis International Competition (1999), Second Prize at the Grodno Composers' Competition in Belarus (2000). She was a finalist at the Guildhall School of Music gold medal in 2004 and a semi finalist at the Top of the World International Piano Competition, Tromsø, Norway in 2009. In 2006, Puzaitė won the Abstract Securities Landor Competition and was awarded a long-term recording contract with Landor Records.

Puzaitė made the first of several performances at the Wigmore Hall in 2007 and has played regularly under different conductors with the Lithuanian National Symphony Orchestra/Antoni Wit/Alan Buribaev/Cyril Diederich. In 2011, she was twice invited to play with the Brighton Philharmonic Orchestra under Barry Wordsworth, and was featured on BBC Radio 3 ‘In-Tune’ with Sean Rafferty. In 2012, Puzaitė made her solo Carnegie Hall debut, and her solo debut at the Rudolfinum in Prague in 2013. In 2016, Puzaitė completed a tour of the Mid-West which included a performance at the Casimir Parish Auditorium, in Cleveland, Ohio and the Dame Myra Hess concert series at the Preston Bradley Hall, Chicago Cultural Center which was simulcast on WFMT Radio.

In 2015 Puzaitė moved to Old Greenwich in Connecticut in the United States with her husband, a publishing executive named Anthony Davies. Together they have three sons.

== Discography ==
- 2001 – Evelina Puzaite piano music, M.K. Ciurlionis National School of Arts
- 2007 – Moments Musicaux, Landor Records
- 2008 – Gorecki, Life Journey, Tocatta for 2 pianos, Landor Records
- 2010 – Schumann Music for Oboe and Piano with Andrius Puskunigis
- 2012 - AUTUMNAL Chamber Music by Thomas Hyde, Guildmusic

== Works ==
- 1999 – 3 preludes op.1
- 1999 – Sonata in C op.2 (published in 2014 in London)
- 2000 – Impression for cello and piano op.3
- 2001 – Piece for voice and harp; 3 piano preludes op.4
- 2002 – Mazurka for piano; Prelude op.5
- 2003 – Piano trio op.6
- 2004 – Four Hungarian Miniatures for piano (Saulėtoji mozaika) op.7
- 2004 – Daina (Saulėtoji mozaika) op.7
- 2004 – Toccatta for 2 pianos (published in Vilnius, Vilnele 3) op.8
- 2008 – Tempo Primo book was published in Vilnius 2008 (presvika publishing)
- 2010 – Music for documentary Lieknas (the Swamp)
