= Elonex =

British computer hardware and related IT services company

Elonex International
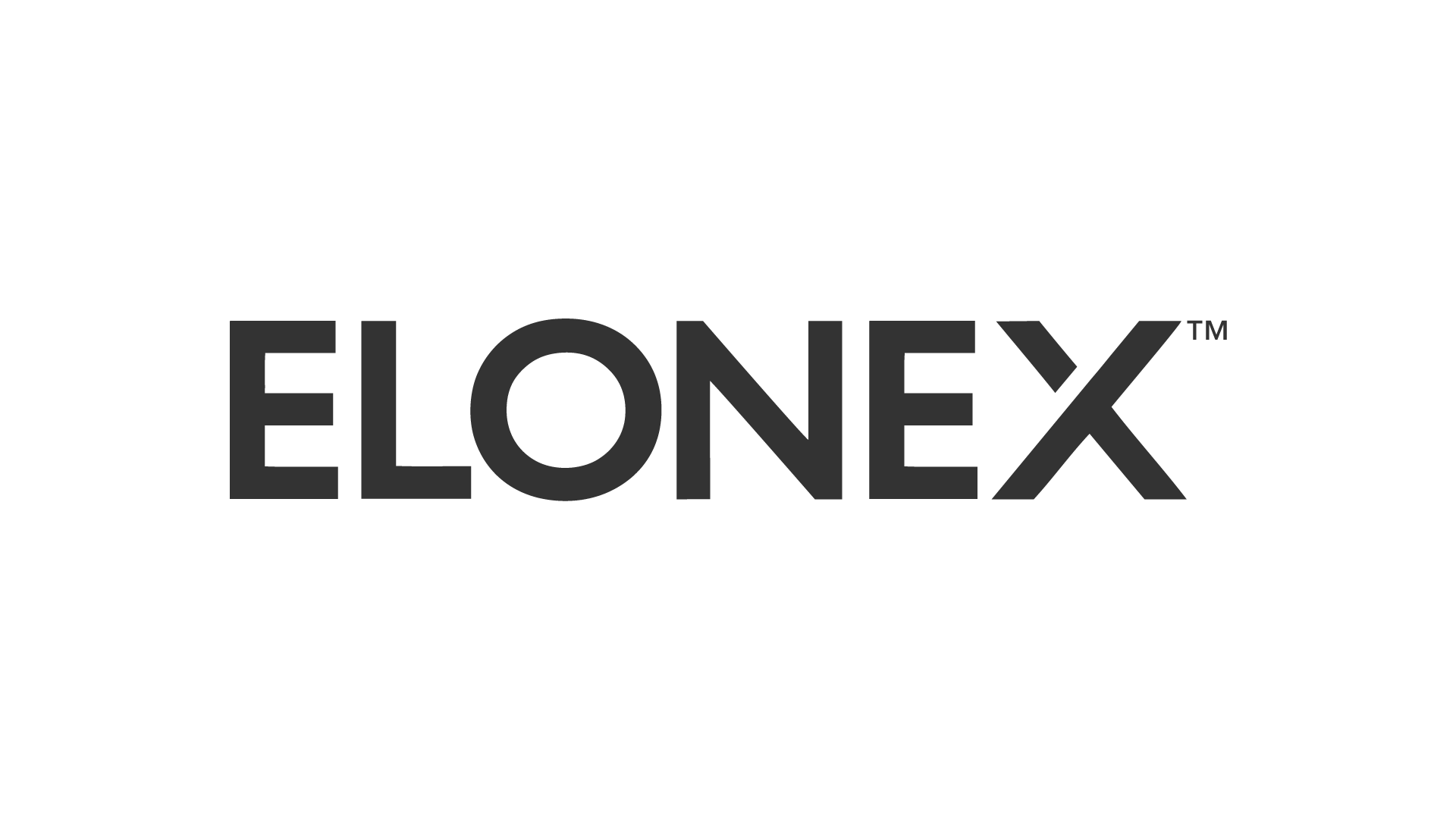
- Type: Limited
- Industry: Consumer Electronics
- Founded: 1986
- Founder: Israel Wetrin
- Headquarters: Birmingham, England, UK
- Website: Official website

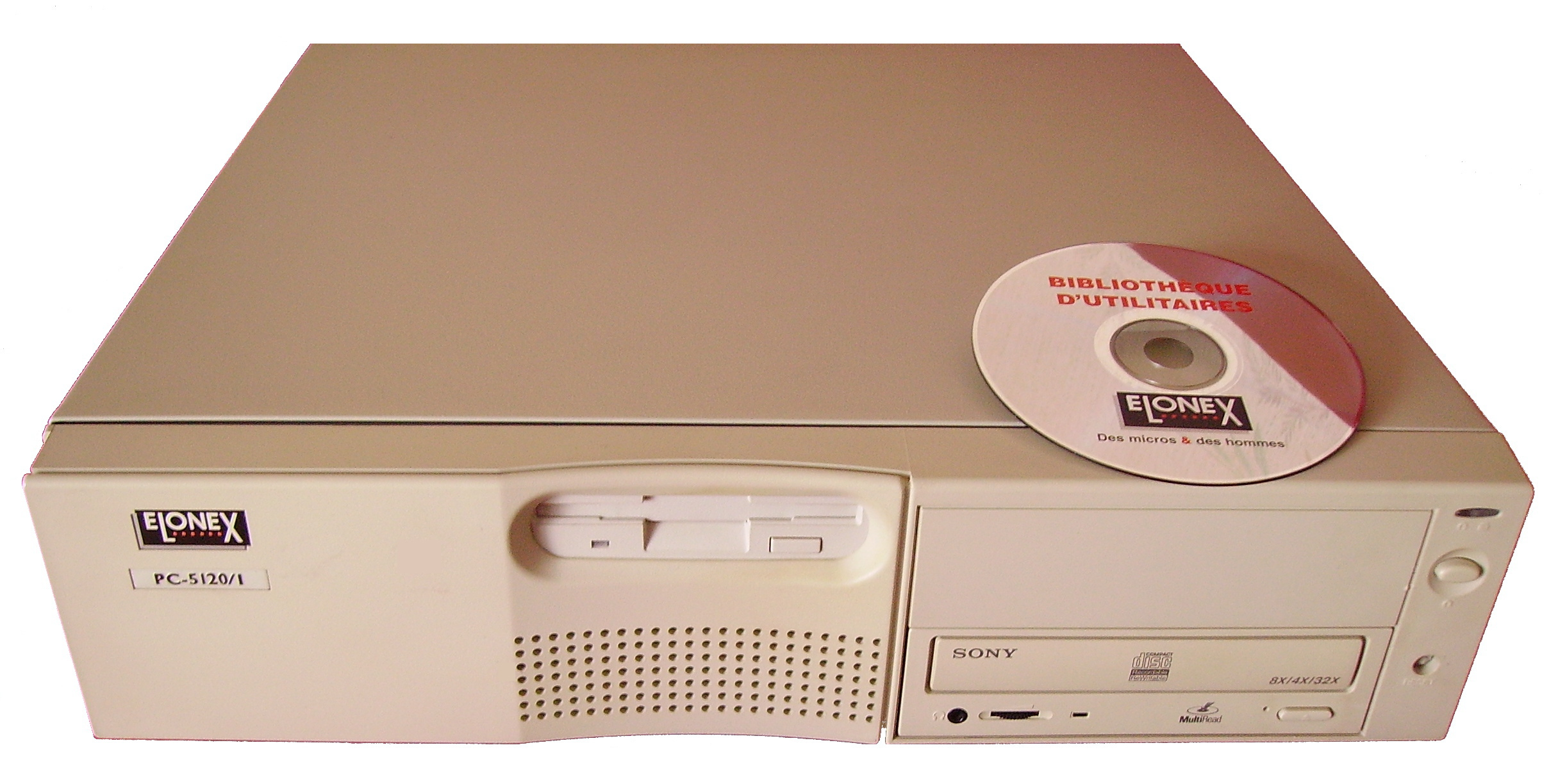
Elonex 5120 PC

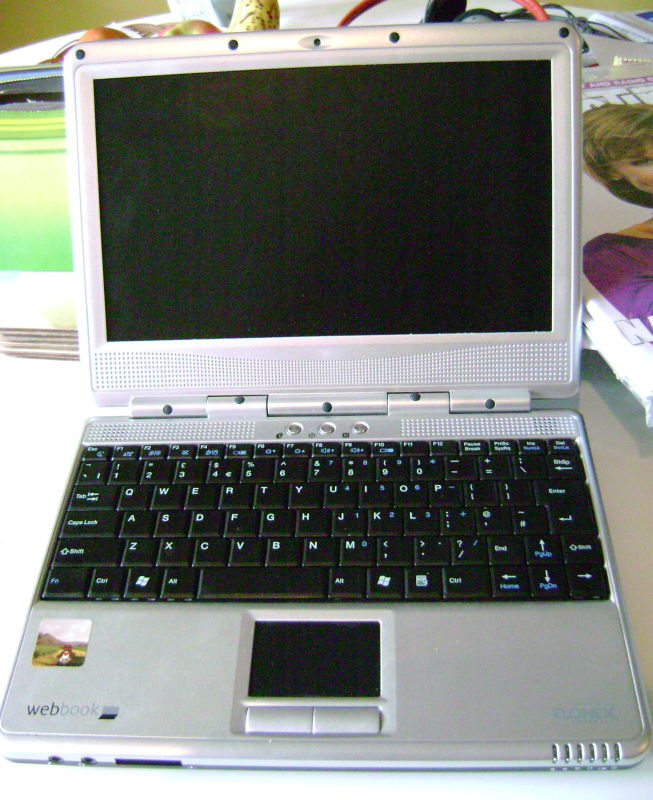
Elonex Webbook

Elonex is a company which rents out advertising space on digital LED billboards in the UK. It was founded in 1986 by Israel Wetrin, an entrepreneur born in Germany, and for two decades manufactured personal computers, becoming one of the first British firms to sell them directly to customers rather than through retailers.

== History ==
Elonex was set up in 1986 by Israel Wetrin, an entrepreneur born in Germany, who began the business from his flat in Finchley, north London. The name joined the final two letters of the names of Wetrin's sons, Daniel and Gideon, to the first two letters of the word "export". The company sold its machines directly to buyers instead of through retailers, an approach comparable to that of Dell, working on margins of about 20 per cent and holding little stock.

By the close of 1993 the firm employed around 200 people, had no external borrowing beyond a mortgage on its London premises, supplied the Ministry of Defence and held close to 200 patents. Turnover for 1994 was approximately £100 million and a stock market flotation was expected within two years.

Elonex announced its PC500S range of network servers in 1993, running UnixWare or Novell NetWare, built on 60 MHz Pentium processors and expandable to 256 MB of memory, with entry-level configurations priced at £5,895. In November 1994 the company introduced the PC-500R/I series of Pentium desktops, which used the PCI local bus, a flash BIOS on the system board and Plug and play support, together with utilities intended to ease the installation of older expansion cards.

Public sector buyers formed a significant part of the customer base. In November 1994 Westminster City Council awarded Elonex a two-year contract worth £1.9 million for desktop computers, servers, notebooks and Microsoft Office software, with an option to extend for a further year worth about £1 million; the award followed an earlier nine-month supply agreement between the two. In 1998 the company supplied the computers, peripherals and software for a £70,000 document management installation at Rotherham Borough Council, which was intended to serve as a demonstration site for other local authorities.

Attempts to broaden the management team were not always successful. The advertising executive and former actor Jamie Minotto was recruited as managing director in 1994 and spoke of placing the firm alongside "IBM, Compaq and Elonex", but left after nine weeks, with other newly hired executives departing soon afterwards.

Assembly work was transferred from London to Cumbernauld in mid-1994, but difficulties from April 1995 led the company to move production back to London. In July 1995 fifty assembly staff at the Scottish plant were made redundant, the company stating that it was using a seasonal fall in sales to reorganise and undertaking to re-employ the workers when the site resumed operations that November.

== Digital advertising ==
In November 2011 Elonex signed a five-season agreement with the Rugby Football League to supply LED advertising boards at Super League grounds and at showcase fixtures including the Challenge Cup final, a deal reported to be worth several million pounds. The governing body terminated the contract on 19 June 2012 after both organisations set out alleged breaches, and clubs were told to remove the boards; several were reported to be owed tens of thousands of pounds. By 2026 the company was described as a Bromsgrove-based supplier of digital out-of-home advertising.

== Products ==
In June 2005 Elonex announced the Lumina, a combined media centre computer and television running Windows XP Media Center Edition on a 3 GHz Pentium 4 with 512 MB of memory and a 200 GB hard disk, housed in a 13 cm deep 81 cm widescreen set with tuner, recorder and FM radio functions.

The Elonex ONE, announced in February 2008, was a £99 Linux-based subnotebook with a 7-inch screen, flash storage and Wi-Fi, weighing under one kilogram and rated for about three hours of battery life; a dearer version added Bluetooth. It was presented at the Education Show in Birmingham on 28 February 2008 and aimed principally at students, including those from low-income households, with one machine to be donated for every hundred sold. Contemporary reports suggested the design was a rebadged version of a Chinese-built device, the Fontastic A-View.

The Elonex Webbook paired a 1.6 GHz VIA C7-M processor with a 10.2-inch display, 512 MB of memory and an 80 GB hard disk, and was sold for £249.99 or bundled free with a 24-month Orange contract. Pocket-lint praised its build and keyboard but criticised the trackpad and its battery life of about two and a half hours. The Elonex ONEt, a £89 netbook reviewed in 2009, used a 400 MHz XBurst processor of MIPS design with 128 MB of memory and a customised CELinux distribution. TechRadar judged it underpowered for everyday web use and poor value against x86 rivals.

In July 2009 the company launched an E Ink e-reader in partnership with the bookshop chain Borders in the United Kingdom. Priced at £189, the device had a six-inch screen, measured 9 mm thick, weighed 180 g and included an SD card slot, and was sold with promotional downloads from the retailer's e-book store.

== Sponsorship ==
Elonex was shirt sponsor of Wimbledon F.C. from the 1994–95 season to the 1998–99 season. The arrangement was renewed in March 1997, shortly after the club's FA Cup quarter-final win over Sheffield Wednesday, in a three-year deal reported at about £3 million. The company became front-of-shirt sponsor of Bromsgrove Sporting F.C. for the 2026–27 season.

== See also ==
- Mesh Computers
- Viglen
