= Evelina Stading =

Swedish artist (1797–1829)

Evelina Stading (January 1, 1797– April 4, 1829), was a Swedish landscape painter.

== Biography ==
Evelina Stading was born in Stockholm, Sweden. She was either the daughter or the niece of the opera singer Franziska Stading (1763–1836). Stading studied art in Stockholm, as a student of the landscape painter Carl Johan Fahlcrantz and continued her studies in Germany and Italy. This was unusual for a Swedish female in the 1820s, and something she was admired by her contemporaries as a pioneer by doing. From 1824 to 1827, she studied art in Dresden, and in 1827, she left for Rome via Prague and Florence, travelling in the company of her aunt. She died of a "breast inflammation" in Rome. Her art is preserved in National Museum of Art, Architecture and Design and Östergötlands museum.

== Selected drawings and paintings ==
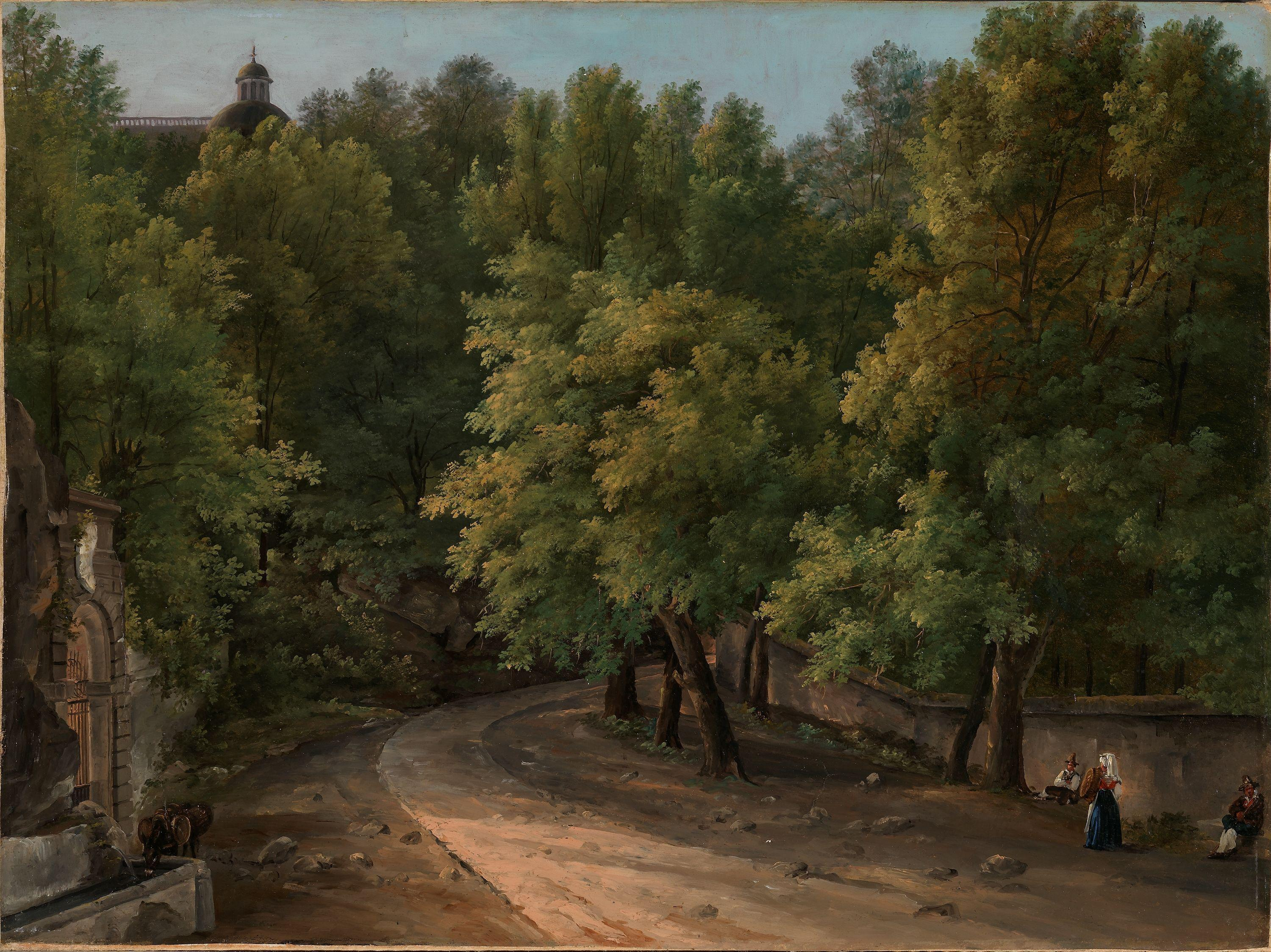
Evelina Stading - From the Park at Palazzo Chigi, Ariccia - NG.M.00183 - National Museum of Art, Architecture and Design

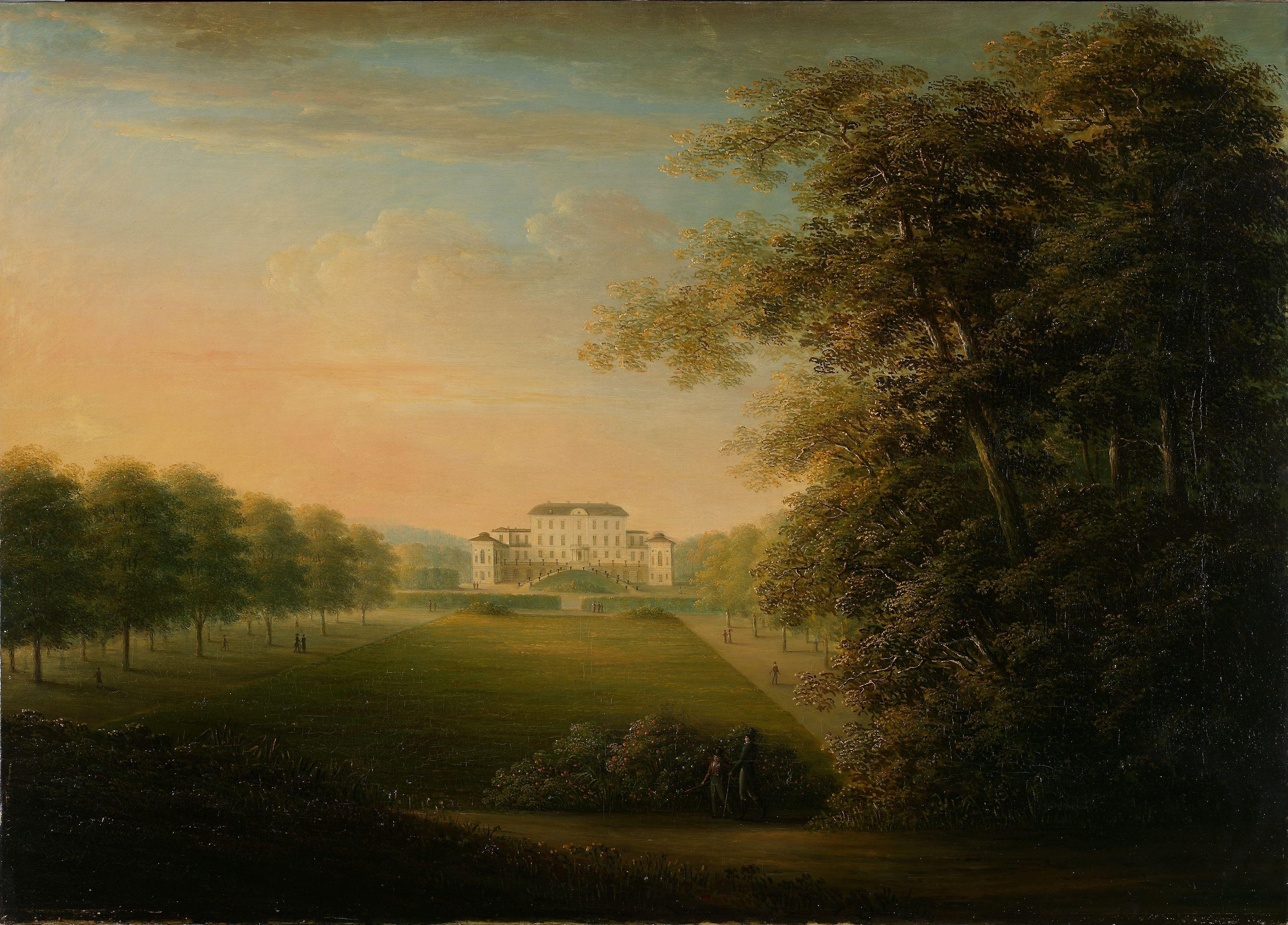
Evelina Stading - Rosersberg slott og park - NG.M.00250 - National Museum of Art, Architecture and Design
