= Lina Pasini-Vitale =

Italian soprano

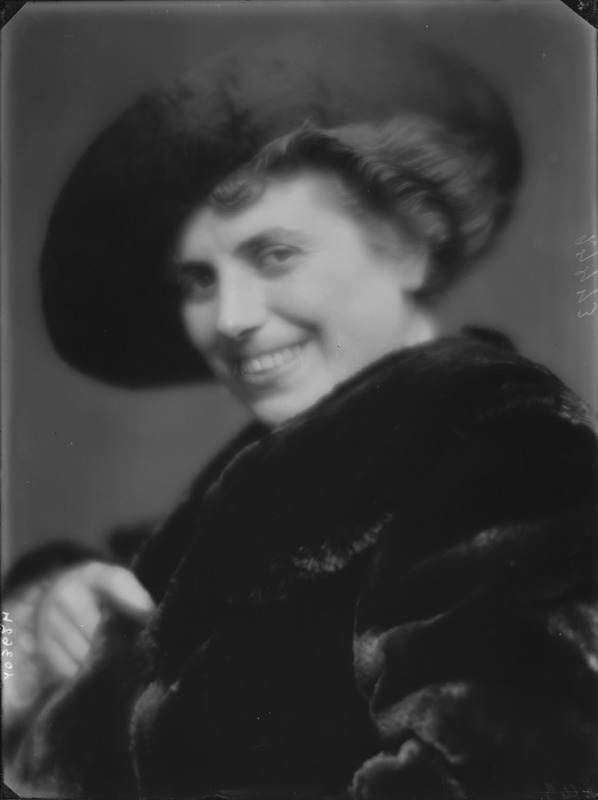

Background information
- Born: November 8, 1878; Rome
- Died: November 23, 1959 (aged 81)

Carolina Pasini-Vitale, known as Lina, (born Rome, November 8, 1872 – died there November 23, 1959) was an Italian soprano. Sister of Camilla Pasini, she studied in Rome before debuting at the Teatro Dal Verme in Milan in Cilea's La tilda. She saw early success at La Scala, in Rome, and in Turin singing Mascagni's Iris and Suzel. She also appeared as Micaëla, Mimi, and Gretel. In 1897 she married the conductor Edoardo Vitale. Beginning in 1914 she became known for her performance in the operas of Richard Wagner, creating Kundry in Buenos Aires for the South American premiere of Parsifal in 1914. In 1926 she appeared as Brünnhilde in Rome; in 1928 she sang Kundry in Naples, and thereafter retired. She recorded numerous excerpts from various operas during her career. Another sister, Enrica Pasini, had a brief career as a mezzo-soprano. Lina Pasini's son was Riccardo Vitale, who eventually became director of the Rome Opera House from the 1940s to the 1970s.
