= Linus (Mysia) =

Ancient town in Anatolia

Coordinates: 40°25′52″N 27°11′48″E

Linus or Linos (Λῖνος), also Linum or Linon (Λίνον), was a town on the coast of ancient Mysia, on the Propontis, between Priapus and Parium. It is noted by Strabo as the spot where the best snails were found.

Its site is located in Asiatic Turkey.
