= Lina Dencik =

British academic and television producer

Lina Dencik is Professor and University Research Leader in AI Justice at Goldsmiths, University of London and co-director of the Data Justice Lab. She specialises in digital media and the politics of data and Artificial Intelligence.

== Published works ==
- Dencik, Lina; Hintz, Arne; Redden, Joanna; Treré, Emiliano (2022). Data Justice. Sage Publications.
- Fenton, Natalie; Freedman, Des; Schlosberg, Justin; Dencik, Lina (2020). The Media Manifesto. Cambridge, UK: Polity Press. p. 140. ISBN 9781509538058.
- Hintz, Arne; Dencik, Lina; Wahl-Jorgensen, Karin (2018). Digital citizenship in a datafied society. Cambridge, UK: Polity Press. ISBN 9781509527168. OCLC 1028901550.
- Dencik, Lina; Leistert, Oliver (2015). Critical perspectives on social media and protest : between control and emancipation. London: Rowman & Littlefield. ISBN 9781783483358. OCLC 908375835.
- Dencik, Lina (2011). Media and global civil society. Palgrave Connect. Basingstoke: Palgrave Macmillan. ISBN 9780230355385. OCLC 767822287.
- Dencik, Lina; Wilkin, Peter (2015). Worker resistance and media : challenging global corporate power in the 21st century. New York: Peter Lang. ISBN 9781433124990. OCLC 909538082.
