= Lina Bertucci =

American artist

Lina Bertucci (born 1958) is an American subculture artist who specializes in photography and film.

Bertucci studied at the Aegean Center for the Fine Arts in Greece (1976), then earned her BFA in photography and video at the University of Wisconsin-Madison (1978), and received her MFA in photography at the Pratt Institute in New York City (1980). Her works tend to focus on women and gender, with one of her most well known pieces being Women in the Tattoo Subculture. She has received the Venice Film Festival's Silver Lion for her work in 2008. She resides in Chicago, Illinois and in New York City.

== Works ==
- Railroad voices. Stanford, California: Stanford University Press, 1998. ISBN 0804732094
