= Lena (name) =

- Pronunciation: LEH-na (Swedish, German, Dutch, Polish, Italian), LYEH-nuh (Russian), LEE-nuh (English), LEH-NAH (Georgian), leh-NAH (Armenian)
- Gender: Female

Origin
- Origin: Greek, Germanic, Scandinavian, Slavic
- Meaning: 'shining light', 'bright'

Lena is a feminine given name, a short form of Helena (Ἑλενα), meaning 'torch' or 'shining light'. It may be a given name by itself or a diminutive of Helena and variants, such as Elena.

== People with the given name ==
- Lena (actress), Malayalam film actress
- Lena Ackebo (born 1950), Swedish comic creator
- Lena Adler (1941–2023), Swedish gymnast
- Lena Adomat (born 1964), Swedish gymnast
- Lena Åkesson (born 1967), Swedish boxer
- Lena Alexander (1899–1983), Scottish painter
- Lena Alhusseini, American activist
- Lena Amsel (1898–1929), German dancer and actress
- Lena Anderson (born 1939), Swedish children's book illustrator and author
- Lena Anderssen (born 1974), Faroese-Canadian singer-songwriter
- Lena Lovato Archuleta (1920–2011), American educator, school librarian and administrator
- Lena Arnoldt (born 1982), German politician
- Lena Clemmons Artz (1891–1976), American botanist
- Lena Ashwell (1872–1957), British actress
- Lena Asplund (born 1956), Swedish politician
- Lena Bäckelin (born 1964), Swedish politician
- Lena Baker (1900–1945), American convicted of murder
- Lena Bergman (born 1943), Swedish social services employee
- Lena Bergström (born 1961), Swedish textiles and glass designer
- Léna Bernstein (1906–1932), German aviator
- Lena Berntsson (born 1978), Swedish athlete
- Lena Beyerling (born 1995), German actress
- Lena Bickel (born 2004), Swiss artistic gymnast
- Lena Biolcati (born 1960), Italian singer
- Lena Blackbird (1933–2021), American Cherokee artist
- Lena Blomkvist (born 1990), Swedish football defender
- Lena Bogdanović (born 1974), Serbian actress
- Lena Borislavova (born 1989), Bulgarian politician and lawyer
- Lena Börjeson (1879–1976), Swedish sculptor, teacher
- Lena Braun (born 1961), German contemporary artist
- Lena Northern Buckner (1875–1939), American social worker
- Léna Bühler (born 1997), Swiss racing driver
- Lena Burke (born 1978), Cuban singer and actress
- Lena Carlzon-Lundbäck (born 1954), Swedish cross-country skier
- Léna Carrau (born 1997), French acrobatic gymnast
- Lena Chamamyan (born 1980), Syrian singer of Armenian origin
- Lena Christ (1881–1920), German writer
- Lena Christensen, Thai-Danish actress, television presenter and singer
- Lena Conradson (born 1948), Swedish singer
- Lena Constante (1909–2005), Romanian artist, essayist and memoirist
- Lena Cronqvist (1938–2025), Swedish painter and sculptor
- Lena Cruz, New Zealand actress
- Lena Cymbrowitz (1957–2000), American politician
- Lena Dąbkowska-Cichocka (born 1973), Polish politician
- Lena Degenhardt (born 1999), German handball player
- Lena Derriecott Bell King (1923–2024), member of the 6888th Central Postal Directory Battalion
- Lena Diab (born 1965), Canadian politician
- Lena Doolin Mason (1864–1924), American Methodist preacher and poet
- Lena Dunham (born 1986), American filmmaker and actress
- Lena Düpont (born 1986), German politician
- Lena Dürr (born 1991), German alpine skier
- Lena Düsterhöft (born 1996), German ice hockey player
- Lena Frances Edwards (1900–1986), American doctor
- Lena Einhorn (born 1954), Swedish director, writer and physician
- Lena Ek (born 1958), Swedish politician
- Lena Eliasson (born 1981), Swedish orienteer and ski-orienteering competitor
- Lena Kristin Ellingsen (born 1980), Norwegian actress
- Lena Emilsson (born 1957), Swedish politician
- Lena Endesfelder (born 1992), German Wine Queen 2016
- Lena Endre (born 1955), Swedish theatre, film and television actress
- Lena Erdil (born 1989), Turkish windsurfer
- Lena Eriksson (born 1972), Swedish breaststroke swimmer
- Lena Estrada, Colombian government official
- Lena Fayre, American singer-songwriter
- Lena Santos Ferguson (1928–2004), American secretary, clubwoman, and civil rights advocate
- Lena Fiagbe, British soul singer-songwriter
- Lena Forsén (born 1951), Swedish Playboy Playmate
- Lena Frerichs (born 2004), German field hockey player
- Lena Frier Kristiansen (born 1983), Danish badminton player
- Lena Jane Fry (1850–1938), Canadian-American writer
- Lena Fujii (born 1984), Japanese singer
- Lena Gabršček (born 1994), Slovenian volleyball player
- Lena Ganschow, German journalist and television moderator
- Lena Georgescu (born 1999), Swiss chess player
- Lena Gercke (born 1988), German model
- Lena Giudici (1898–1995), American lawyer
- Lena Glaz (born 1961), Israeli chess player
- Lena Goeßling (born 1986), German footballer
- Léna Goetsch (born 1999), French footballer
- Lena Göldi (born 1979), Swiss Olympic judoka
- Lena Gonzalez (born 1981), American politician
- Lena Göppel (born 2001), Liechtensteiner footballer
- Lena Góra (born 1990), Polish actress
- Lena Gorelik, German writer
- Lena Grabowski (born 2002), Austrian swimmer
- Léna Grandveau (born 2003), French handball player
- Lena Grebak (born 1991), Danish badminton player
- Lena Groeger, American journalist
- Lena Guerrero (1957–2008), American politician
- Lena Gumnior (born 1992), German politician
- Lena Gurr (1897–1992), American painter
- Lena Häcki (born 1995), Swiss biathlete
- Lena Hades (born 1959), Russian painter
- Lena Hallengren (born 1973), Swedish Social Democratic Party
- Lena Halliday (c. 1872–1937), English actress
- Lena Hallin (born 1961), Swedish Air Force major general
- Lena Tracy Hanks (1879–1944), American psychologist
- Lena T. Hansson (born 1955), Swedish actress
- Lena Hasselström (born 1972), Swedish ski-orienteering competitor
- Lena Culver Hawkins (1866–1949), American major and suffragette
- Lena Headey (born 1973), British actress
- Lena Henke, German artist
- Lena Hentschel (born 2001), German diver
- Lena Hill, American academic administrator
- Lena Himmelstein (1877–1951), American clothing designer and retailer
- Lena Hjelm-Wallén (born 1943), Swedish politician
- Lena Horne (1917–2010), American singer and actress
- Lena Isaksson, Swedish ski-orienteering competitor
- Lena Ivančok (born 2001), Austrian handballer
- Lena Terrell Jackson (1865–1943), American educator
- Lena Jedwab-Rozenberg (1924–2005), Polish-French Jewish writer
- Lena Jeger, Baroness Jeger (1915–2007), British politician
- Lena Jensen (born 1973), Norwegian politician
- Lena Jensen Rogn (born 1980), Norwegian cross-country skier
- Lena Johansson (born 1969), Swedish politician
- Lena Jordan, Russian gymnast
- Léna Kandissounon (born 1998), French athlete
- Lena Kapp, German curler
- Lena Kaur, British actress
- Lena Kenin (1897–1968), American physician
- Lena Kennedy (1914–1986), English author
- Lena Khan, film director and writer
- Lena King Lee (1906–2006), American politician
- Lena Klenke (born 1995), German actress
- Lena Kolarska-Bobińska (born 1947), Polish sociologist, academic and politician
- Lena Kourkoutis (1979–2023), American physicist
- Lena Kovačević (born 1992), Serbian singer
- Lena Kreck (born 1981), German politician
- Lena Kreundl (born 1997), Austrian swimmer
- Lena Küchler-Silberman (1910–1987), Jewish World War II resistance
- Lena Lattwein (born 2000), German footballer
- Lena Lauzemis (born 1983), German actress
- Lena Levine (1903–1965), American physician
- Lena Liepe (born 1962), Swedish art historian
- Lena Adelsohn Liljeroth (born 1955), Swedish politician
- Lena Litvak (born 1988), Ukrainian-born American tennis player
- Lena Lootens (born 1959), Belgian soprano
- Lena Lotzen (born 1993), German footballer
- Lena Lowis (1845–1919), British author and scientific illustrator
- Lena Lutz (born 2001), Swiss ice hockey player
- Lena Machado (1903–1974) Native Hawaiian singer, composer, and ukulele player
- Lena Malkus (born 1993), German long jumper
- Lena Marquise (born 1985), Russian interdisciplinary artist
- Lena Martell (born 1940), Scottish singer
- Lena Maryana (born 1962), Indonesian politician
- Lena B. Mathes (1861–1951), American educator, social reformer, and ordained minister
- Lena McEwan (1927–2011), Australian plastic surgeon
- Lena McLin (1928–2023), American composer
- Lena Mellin, Swedish journalist
- Lena Meyer-Landrut (born 1991), German singer, winner of the Eurovision Song Contest 2010
- Lena Micheel (born 1998), German field hockey player
- Lena Micko (born 1955), Swedish politician
- Lena Miculek, American professional competitive shooter, firearms educator and product developer
- Lena Mihailovic (born 1996), Australian water polo player
- Léna Mill-Reuillard, Canadian cinematographer and photographer
- Lena Moi (1926–2004), First Lady of Kenya
- Lena Möller (born 1957), Swedish sprinter
- Lena Möllers (born 1990), German volleyball player
- Lena L. Moore (died 1969), American politician
- Lena Moreno, Spanish taekwondo practitioner
- Lena Morrow Lewis, American orator and politician
- Lena Beatrice Morton (c. 1901–1981), American educator and literary scholar
- Lena Mukhina (1924–1991), Russian diarist
- Lena Müller (born 1987), German rower
- Lena Nazaryan (born 1983), Armenian journalist and politician
- Lena Neudauer, German violinist
- Lena Neumann, German film editor
- Lena Niang (born 1996), Senegalese basketball player
- Lena Nilsson (born 1962), Swedish actress
- Lena Noreses (born 1994), Namibian footballer
- Lena Nyadbi (1936–2024), Australian artist
- Lena Nyman (1944–2011), Swedish actress
- Lena Nymark (born 1980), Norwegian jazz musician
- Lena Oberdorf (born 2001), German footballer
- Lena Olin (born 1955), Swedish actress
- Lena Ostermeier (born 1996), German association footballer
- Lena Papadakis (born 1998), German tennis player
- Lena Pappa (1932–2025), Greek poet
- Lena Pauels (born 1998), German footballer
- Lena Persson Herlitz (born 1967), Swedish Amphibious Corps officer
- Lena Petermann (born 1994), German footballer
- Lena Madesin Phillips (1881–1955), American lawyer and clubwoman
- Lena Piękniewska (born 1980), Polish singer
- Lena Platonos (born 1951), Greek musician, pianist, and composer
- Lena Plesiutschnig (born 1993), Austrian beach volleyball player
- Lena Prewitt (1931–2024), American academic
- Lena Prima, American jazz singer
- Lena Rådström Baastad (born 1974), Swedish politician
- Lena Raine (born 1984), American video game composer and producer
- Lena Rea, Irish badminton player
- Lena Charlotte Reißner (born 2000), German cyclist
- Lena Repinc (born 2003), Slovenian biathlete
- Lena Richard (1892 or 1893–1950), American cookbook author and restaurateur
- Lena Röhlings (born 2002), German canoeist
- Lena Rosenthal (1920–2007), birthname of American businesswoman Leona Helmsley
- Lena Sadick, lawn and indoor bowler
- Lena Samuelsson, Swedish ski-orienteering competitor
- Lena Sandin (born 1961), Swedish tennis player
- Lena Sandlin-Hedman (born 1969), Swedish politician
- Lena Saradnik (born 1947), American politician
- Lena Schilling (born 2001), Austrian climate activist
- Lena Schöneborn (born 1986), German modern pentathlete
- Lena L. Severance (1855–1942), American mathematician, author, world traveler and activist
- Lena Silano (born 2000), American soccer player
- Lena Sjöholm (born 1946), Swedish archer
- Lena Smedsaas (1951–2014), Swedish journalist and writer
- Lena O. Smith (1885–1966), American lawyer and civil rights advocate
- Lena B. Smithers Hughes (1905–1987), American botanist
- Lena Söderblom (born 1935), Swedish actress
- Lena Solli-Reimann (born 1969), Norwegian hurdler
- Lena Sommestad (born 1957), Swedish politician and economic historian
- Lena Spoof (born 1961), Finnish archaeologist and hurdler
- Lena Springs (1883–1942), American politician
- Lena Ruth Stefanovic, Montenegrin author and poet
- Lena Stigrot (born 1994), German volleyball player
- Lena Stöcklin (born 1990), German canoeist
- Lena Stojković (born 2002), Croatian taekwondo practitioner
- Lena Stolze (born 1956), German actress
- Lena Strömdahl (born 1947), Swedish actress
- Lena Sulkanen (born 1960), Swedish bowler
- Lena Sundström (born 1972), Swedish journalist and author
- Lena Swanson (born 1937), American politician and activist
- Lena Taylor (born 1966), American politician
- Lena Teschlade (born 1988), German politician
- Lena Teunissen (born 1997), Dutch canoeist
- Lena Townsend (1911–2004), British Conservative politician
- Lena Trent Gordon (1885–1935), American social worker, orator, government official and poet
- Lena Triendl (born 2000), Austrian footballer
- Lena Khalaf Tuffaha, American poet
- Lena Tyriberget (born 1973), Norwegian football coach
- Lena Uebach (born 2000), German association football player
- Lena Urbaniak (born 1992), German shot putter
- Lena Urzendowsky (born 2000), German actress
- Lena Valaitis (born 1943), Lithuanian-German singer
- Lena Valaoritou (1897–1967), Greek tennis player
- Lena Videkull (born 1962), Swedish footballer
- Lena Waithe (born 1984), American screenwriter, producer, and actress
- Lena Wermelt (born 1990), German footballer
- Lena Werner (born 1994), German politician
- Lena Willemark (born 1960), Swedish musician
- Lena Wilson (c. 1898 – c. 1939), American blues singer
- Lena Wilson (executive), Scottish businessperson
- Lena Wisborg (born 1965), Swedish actress
- Lena Wood (1899–1982), British violist
- Lena Yada (born 1978), Japanese-American model
- Lena Zagst (born 1990), German politician
- Lena Zavaroni (1963–1999), Scottish singer
- Lena Żelichowska (1910–1958), Polish actress
- Lena Zingsheim-Zobel (born 1993), German politician

== Nickname ==
- Jennie Lena, stage name of Jennie Willemstijn (born 1977), Dutch singer and songwriter
- Lena Asmus, nickname of Helene Asmus (born 1982), Russian and German rhythmic gymnast
- Lena Belkina or Olena Leser (born 1987), Ukrainian mezzo-soprano
- Lena Blackburne, nickname of Russell Aubrey Blackburne (1886–1968), American baseball infielder, manager, coach, and scout
- Lena Brogren, nickname of Ulla-Britt Brogren (1929–2005), was a Swedish actress
- Lena Margareta Wilton, nickname of Lena Carlsson (born 1972), Swedish sailor
- Lena Chettiar, stage name of S. M. Letchuman Chettiar, Indian film producer
- Lena Connell, stage name of Adelin Beatrice Connell, also known professionally as Beatrice Cundy, (1875–1949), British suffragette and a well-known photographer
- Lena Crittenden/Lee Crittenden, pennames of Lela E. Buis, American speculative fiction writer, playwright, poet and artist
- Lena d'Água, stage name of Helena Maria de Jesus Águas (born 1956), Portuguese singer
- Lena Farugia, stage name of Nicolina Elizabeth Farruggia (1951–2019), American-born South African actress, screenwriter, director and producer
- Lena Guilbert Ford (1870–1918), American poet
- Lena Granhagen (born 1938), Swedish actress
- Lena Hall, stage name of Celina Consuela Gabriella Carvajal (born 1980), American actress and singer
- Lena Herzog, stage name of Elena Herzog (née Pisetski; born 1970), Russian-American visual artist and photographer
- Lena Kang, stage name of Kang Re-Na (born 2002), South Korean singer, former member of K-pop group GWSN
- Lena Katina, stage name of Elena Sergeevna Katina (born 1984), Russian singer
- Lena Lakomy stage name of Helena Lakomy (1917–2010), survivor of Nazi concentration camps
- Anna Karolina Larsson, nickname of Lena Larsson (1882–1967), Swedish ballad singer
- Lena Michaëlis, nickname of Helena Cornelia Michaëlis (1905–1982), Dutch discus thrower
- Lena Milman, nickname of Angelena Frances Milman (1862–1914), British translator, critic and architectural historian
- Lena Neuner, nickname of Magdalena Neuner (married name Magdalena Holzer; born 1987), German biathlete
- Lena Ovchynnikova, nickname of Oléna Serhíyivna Ovchýnnikova (born 1987), Ukrainian kickboxer and mixed martial artist
- Lena Oxton, fictional Overwatch character, known as Tracer (Overwatch)
- Lena Park, stage name of Park Jung-hyun (born 1976), Korean singer, also known as Park Jung Hyun (박정현)
- Lena Pedersen, stage name of Elizabeth Magdalena Pedersen or Lena Pederson, Canadian Inuk politician
- Lena Philipsson, stage name of Maria Magdalena Philipsson (born 1966), Swedish singer, also known as "Lena Ph"
- Lena Piskun, nickname of Elena Mikhaylovna Piskun (born 1978), Belarusian artistic gymnast
- Lena Purcell, nickname of Samuelene Purcell (1898–1982), New Zealand shop assistant and trade unionist
- Lena Rice, nickname of Helena Bertha Grace Rice (1866–1907), Irish tennis player
- Lena Ruru, nickname of Rina Matewai Ruru (1902–1977), New Zealand community leader, sportswoman, pianist and Māori welfare worker
- Lena Scissorhands, stage name of Elena Cataraga (born 1986), Moldovan heavy metal singer and songwriter
- Léna Situations, stage name of Léna Mahfouf (born 1997), French vlogger
- Lena Stein-Schneider stage name of Helene Meyerstein (born 1958), German composer, singer and pianist
- Lena Strothmann, Magdalena Strothmann (born 1952), German politician
- Lena Styles, nickname of William Graves Styles (1899–1956), American baseball catcher
- Lena Svedberg, nickname of Aina-Lena Bernice Svedberg (1946–1972), Swedish artist
- Lena Thomson, stage name of Helena Agnes Thomson (1868–1938), Scottish amateur golfer
- Lena Tretyakova, stage name of Elena Nikolaevna Tretyakova (born 1988), Russian singer
- Lena Ustymenko, nickname of Olena Ustymenko Sokolowski (born 1986), Ukrainian volleyball player

== Disambiguation ==
- Lena Andersson, several people

== Fictional characters ==
- The female protagonist in an Ole and Lena joke
- Lena, in the 1996 anime Shamanic Princess
- Lena, played by Marion Cotillard in the 2006 film Toi et Moi
- Lena, played by Emma Levie in the 2011 film Lena
- Lena, played by Natalie Portman in the 2018 film Annihilation
- Lena, in the book series Fablehaven
- Lena Adams, in the Grant County, Georgia series of books
- Lena Duchannes, in the Beautiful Creatures series of books
- Lena Dupree, an antagonist in Scooby-Doo on Zombie Island
- Lena Adams Foster, in American TV series The Fosters
- Lena Gogan, a character in the 1977 film Pete's Dragon
- Lena Grove, in the William Faulkner novel Light In August
- Lena Haloway, in the Delirium series of books by Lauren Oliver
- Lena Hatun, in Turkish TV series Kuruluş: Osman
- Lena Kaligaris, in the Sisterhood of the Traveling Pants series of books
- Lena Luthor, Lex Luthor's sister in DC Comics
- Lena Milizé, in 86: Eighty Six, short for Vladilena
- Lena "Tracer" Oxton, in the video games Overwatch and Heroes of the Storm
- Lena Seguret, in The Returned television show
- Lena De Spell, in the DuckTales television show
- Lena Tikhonova in the Everlasting Summer game
- Lenna Charlotte Tycoon, one of the main characters of Final Fantasy V
- Lena Younger, in the A Raisin In The Sun play

== People with the surname ==
- Jeffrey Lena (born 1958), American lawyer
- Jennie Lena, Dutch singer-songwriter
- Emanuel Melkiades Laka Lena (born 1976), Indonesian politician who currently serves as Governor of East Nusa Tenggara
- Nijaz Lena (born 1986), Macedonian footballer

== See also ==
- Lenna (disambiguation)
- Lanna (disambiguation)
- Leena, Leana, Lene, Leni (name) Lenka
- Lina
- Linna (disambiguation)
