= Cossey =

Cossey is a surname. Notable people with the name include:

- Alice Cossey (1879–1970), New Zealand tailer and union leader
- Caroline Cossey (born 1954), British model and actress
- Erin Cossey (born 1971), New Zealand Māori former rugby union player
- Mark Cossey, New Zealand former association football player
- Reginald 'Mick' Cossey (1935–1986), New Zealand rugby union player
- Rudi Cossey (born 1961), Belgian football coach and former player

== See also ==
- Cosseys Reservoir, lake in Auckland Region in New Zealand
- Costessey, civil parish in Norfolk, England
