= Lenna (disambiguation) =

Lenna is a standard test image used in image processing.

Lenna may also refer to:

== People ==
- Lenna (name), given name or a surname
- Lenna Arnold (1920–2010), American baseball player
- Lenna Bradburn (born 1960), Canadian executive
- Lena Forsén (born 1951), Swedish model, subject of the Lenna test image
- Lenna Kuurmaa (born 1985), Estonian singer
  - Lenna (album), 2010 album by Lenna Kuurmaa
- Reginald Lenna (1912–2000), American businessman

== Places ==
- Lenna, Lombardy, Italy
- Lenna, Oklahoma, United States
- Lenna, old spelling of Länna, Uppsala Municipality, Sweden
- Lenna Strait, in West Papua, Indonesia

== Characters ==
- Lenna Charlotte Tycoon

== See also ==
- Lena (disambiguation)
- Lanna (disambiguation)
- Linna (disambiguation)
