= Blomqvist =

Blomqvist (Swedish for 'flower branch'; pronounced [ˈblʊ̂mːkvɪst]) or Blomkvist is a surname.

== Geographical distribution ==
As of 2014, 70.1% of all known bearers of the surname Blomqvist were residents of Sweden (frequency 1:1,099), 25.2% of Finland (1:1,704), 1.1% of Norway (1:36,471) and 1.0% of Estonia (1:10,745).

In Sweden, the frequency of the surname was higher than national average (1:1,099) in the following counties:

1. Södermanland County (1:721)
2. Jönköping County (1:741)
3. Kalmar County (1:772)
4. Dalarna County (1:828)
5. Norrbotten County (1:919)
6. Uppsala County (1:969)
7. Kronoberg County (1:981)
8. Blekinge County (1:993)
9. Stockholm County (1:1,030)
10. Västmanland County (1:1,054)

In Finland, the frequency of the surname was higher than national average (1:1,704) in the following regions:

1. Åland (1:168)
2. Ostrobothnia (1:384)
3. Southwest Finland (1:820)
4. Uusimaa (1:1,068)
5. Central Ostrobothnia (1:1,194)

== People ==
- Andreas Blomqvist, Swedish heavy metal bassist
- Andreas Blomqvist (footballer), Swedish footballer
- Anna-Lena Blomkvist, Swedish politician
- Anni Blomqvist, Finland-Swedish novelist
- Axel Blomqvist, former Swedish speed skater
- Cecilia Blomqvist, Finnish deaconess
- Christina Blomqvist, Swedish orienteering competitor
- Elisabeth Blomqvist, Finnish educator
- Erik Blomqvist (athlete), former Swedish Olympic track and field athlete
- Erik Blomqvist (sport shooter), former Swedish sport shooter
- Erik Blomqvist (chess player), Swedish chess grandmaster
- Jacob Blomqvist, Swedish ice hockey player
- Jesper Blomqvist, Swedish football player and coach
- Johan Blomqvist, bassist of Swedish band Backyard Babies
- Kalle Blomkvist, fictional character created by Astrid Lindgren
- Lena Blomkvist, Swedish football defender
- Mikael Blomkvist, fictional character who appears in Millennium Trilogy.
- Minea Blomqvist, Finnish professional golfer
- Olov Blomkvist, Swedish architect
- Ossi Blomqvist, former Finnish speed skater
- Rebecka Blomqvist (born 1997), Swedish footballer
- Stig Blomqvist, Swedish rally driver
- Timo Blomqvist, Finnish ice hockey player
- Tom Blomqvist, British racing driver

== See also ==
- Blomquist
- Bloomquist
