= Kreck =

Kreck is a German language surname. Notable people with the name include:

- Lena Kreck (born 1981), German lawyer and professor
- Matthias Kreck (born 1947), German mathematician who works in the areas of Algebraic Topology and Differential topology
