= Leena =

Leena is a feminine given name. It is a variant spelling of Lina and Lena.

It is a direct Quranic Arabic name, meaning "young palm tree", or figuratively "tender, young, delicate".

In Persian, it means "light", "a ray of sunlight" or "beautiful girl". In Kurdish, it means cascade falls (تئاڤگەی بچوک).

In Finnish, Leena is a short form of "Magdaleena" (Magdalene) or "Helena".

Notable people with the name include:

- Leena (model) (born 1990), Japanese fashion model
- Leena Alam, Afghan film actress
- Leena Khamis (born 1986), Australian football player of Assyrian-Iraqi descent
- Leena Chandavarkar (born 1950), Indian Bollywood actress
- Leena Dhingra, British Asian actress
- Leena Gade (born c. 1975), British race engineer
- Leena Günther (born 1991), German sprint athlete
- Leena Harkimo (born 1963), Finnish politician and business executive
- Leena Häkinen (1928–1990), Finnish stage, film and television actress
- Leena Jumani, Indian actress and model
- Leena Jung (born 1959), Thai businesswoman, lawyer, politician, television host, influencer and actress
- Leena Kapoor (born 1994), Indian model and actress
- Leena Krohn (born 1947), Finnish author
- Leena La Bianca (born 1963), Italian American pornographic actress
- Leena Lander (born 1955), Finnish author
- Leena Lehtolainen (born 1964), Finnish crime novelist
- Leena Luhtanen (born 1941), Finnish politician, member of the cabinet
- Leena Luostarinen (1949–2013), Finnish painter
- Leena Manimekalai, Indian filmmaker, poet and actor
- Leena Mohanty, Indian Odissi dancer
- Leena Nair (born 1969), Indian businesswoman
- Leena Peisa (born 1979), Finnish keyboard player
- Leena Peltonen-Palotie (1952–2010), Finnish geneticist
- Leena Pietilä (1925–2014), Finnish figure skater
- Leena Puotiniemi (born 1976), Finnish long-distance runner
- Leena Puranen (born 1986), Finnish football forward
- Leena Rauhala (born 1942), Finnish politician, member of the Parliament of Finland
- Leena Salmenkylä (born 1958), Finnish orienteering competitor
- Leena Silvennoinen (born 1958), Finnish orienteering competitor
- Leena Tiwari, Indian politician, member of 17th Legislative Assembly of Mariyahu, Uttar Pradesh
- Leena Yadav (born 1971), Indian filmmaker and producer

== Fictional characters ==
- Leena (莉娜), a character in the Taiwanese television series Port of Lies (八尺門的辯護人).
- Leena (Warehouse 13), from Warehouse 13
- A character in Chrono Cross
- Leena Klammer, the main antagonist from Orphan (2009 film) and its sequel.

== Media ==
- Leena (film), a Maldivian thriller film
- "Leena", a song by Caravan Palace on the 2019 album Chronologic

== See also ==
- Lena (name)
