= Lee Levine =

Lee Levine may refer to:

- Lena Levine (1903–1965), known as Lee Levine, American psychiatrist and gynecologist
- Lee I. Levine, Talmud scholar, professor of Jewish history and archaeology
