= Lenah =

Lenah may refer to:

== People ==
- Lenah Cheruiyot (born 1973), Kenyan long-distance runner
- Anna Lenah Elgström (1884–1968), Swedish author
- Lenah Higbee (1874–1941), Canadian-born United States Navy military nurse
- Lenah Miga, South African politician

== Places ==
- Lenah, Virginia, unincorporated community in Loudoun County, Virginia, United States
- Lenah Valley, suburb of Hobart, Tasmania, Australia

== See also ==
- USS Lenah H. Sutcliffe Higbee, United States Navy Arleigh Burke-class Flight IIA guided missile destroyer
- Lena (disambiguation)
- Lenna
