= Dirk Behrendt =

German politician

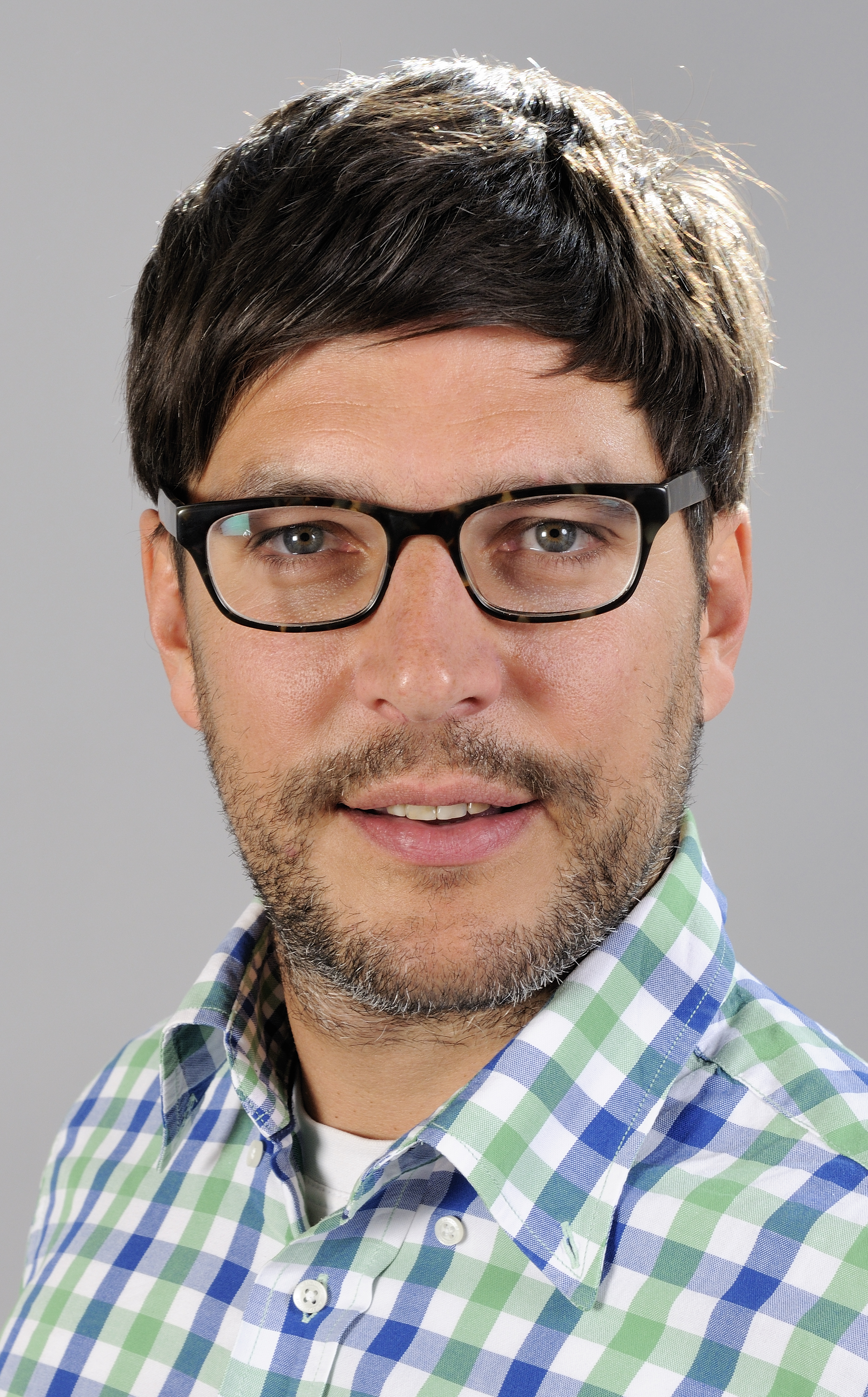
- Behrendt in 2013

Senator for Justice, Consumer Protection and Anti-Discrimination of Berlin
- In office 8 December 2016 – 21 December 2021
- Governing Mayor: Michael Müller
- Preceded by: Thomas Heilmann
- Succeeded by: Lena Kreck (Justice and Anti-Discrimination); Bettina Jarasch (Consumer Protection)

Member of the Abgeordnetenhaus of Berlin
- In office 17 September 2006 – 19 September 2016

Personal details
- Born: Dirk Behrendt; 5 August 1971 (age 55) West Berlin
- Party: Alliance 90/The Greens
- Education: Free University of Berlin

Dirk Behrendt (born 5 August 1971) is a German lawyer and politician of the Alliance 90/The Greens. He served as Senator for Justice, Consumer Protection and Anti-Discrimination in the Berlin state government from 2016 to 2021, and as a member of the Abgeordnetenhaus of Berlin from 2006 to 2016. Prior to this, he was a judge in Berlin and served as spokesman of the Berlin–Brandenburg Judges Association.

== Personal life ==
Behrendt grew up in the Berlin borough of Reinickendorf in the Märkisches Viertel housing development. Both his parents were involved in the Social Democratic Party (SPD). Behrendt initially gravitated toward the Social Democrats politically, but turned to the Greens in the 1990s because of their line on asylum policy. In 1992, he moved into a shared apartment in the Kreuzberg neighbourhood. He now lives in Kreuzberg with his partner Daniel Wesener.

== Education and legal career ==
Behrendt earned his Abitur in 1990. He studied law from 1990 to 1995, earning his doctorate on the subject of The auditing activities of the Federal Audit Office outside of the direct federal administration at the Free University of Berlin, and completed his legal clerkship at the Kammergericht (Supreme Court). He then entered the judiciary from 2000, working first at the Landgericht Berlin (Regional Court), then at the Berlin-Mitte and Köpenick local courts. From 2005 to 2006, he held a judgeship at the Berlin Administrative Court. From 2003 to 2005, he was the state spokesman for the New Judges Association of Berlin/Brandenburg.

== Political career ==
Behrendt has been a member of the Greens since 1994. From 1995 to 1999, he was a member of the Kreuzberg district council, where was chairman of the Environment and Transportation Committee and a member of the Economic Committee. During the interim coalition of the SPD and Greens which governed Berlin in late 2001, Behrendt was a staff member for Senator for Justice Wolfgang Wieland.

Behrendt was elected to the Abgeordnetenhaus of Berlin in the 2006 Berlin state election as representative for Friedrichshain-Kreuzberg 2, winning 42% of the vote. He became legal policy spokesman for the Greens faction, and a member of the Interior Committee and Constitution and Law Committee.

In 2011, Behrendt drew attention to the problems caused by booming tourism in Kreuzberg, accusing the SPD–Left government of praising the numbers but ignoring the issues. He opposed strengthening law enforcement to shut down loud parties, instead proposing limits on overnight accommodation in the borough. He was re-elected to the Abgeordnetenhaus in the 2011 Berlin state election, winning 49.8% in his constituency, the strongest result for any directly elected member.

Behrendt is considered a representative of the left wing of the Greens, and during his time in the Abgeordnetenhaus, he had a feud with the more conservative faction co-leader Volker Ratzmann. After the 2011 election, Behrendt challenged him for the leadership, but was unsuccessful.

Behrendt did not seek re-election in the 2016 Berlin state election.

=== Senator for Justice ===
After the 2016 election, Behrendt was appointed Senator for Justice, Consumer Protection and Anti-Discrimination in the second Müller senate.

In 2018, he suggested that fare evasion should be classified as a misdemeanour rather than a felony, and proposed a corresponding initiative for consideration by the German Bundesrat. At the same time, he opposed completely free public transit on that basis that tourists should be required to pay to ride, though he was open to dropping fees for Berlin residents.

In March 2020, Behrendt said that Germany had a human rights obligation to take refugees from the Moria refugee camp in Greece, and suggested that the state government could collaborate with non-governmental organisations to fly refugees to Berlin if the federal government did not take timely action.

Behrendt left office after the 2021 Berlin state election and the formation of the Giffey senate, and was succeeded as Justice Senator by Lena Kreck of The Left.
