= Leana =

Female given name

Leana is a feminine given name. Notable people with the name include:

- Leana de Bruin (born 1977), South African and New Zealand netball player
- Leana Wen (born 1983), American physician and public health advocate

== See also ==
- Lena (name)
