= Linna =

Linna may refer to:

== Places ==
- Linna, Ida-Viru County, village in Jõhvi Parish, Ida-Viru County, Estonia
- Linna, Valga County, village in Tõrva Parish, Valga County, Estonia

== People ==
- Linna Vogel Irelan (1846–1935), German-born American potter and author
- Linna (surname)

== See also ==
- Lina (disambiguation)
- Lenna (disambiguation)
