= Laura Viaud =

French gymnast

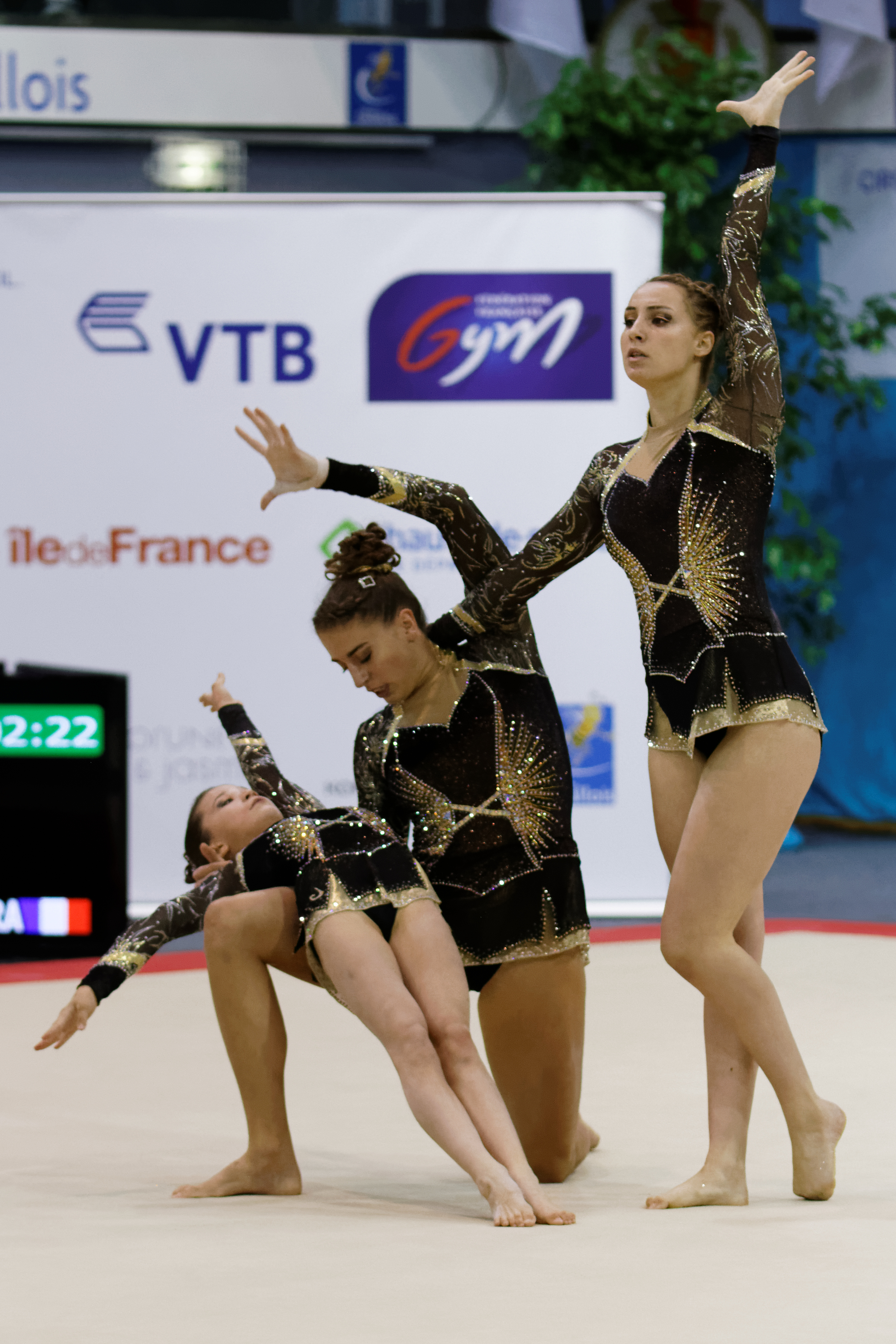
- Laura Viaud, Léna Carrau and Agathe Meunier at the 2014 Acrobatic Gymnastics World Championships

Personal information
- Born: 30 December 1999 (age 26) Pessac

Gymnastics career
- Discipline: Acrobatic gymnastics
- Country represented: France
- Head coach: Magali Philouze
- Former coaches: Jennifer Duboz, Magali Philouze
- Choreographer: Pierre-Jean Gamard

Laura Viaud (born 30 December 1999) is a French female acrobatic gymnast. With partners Léna Carrau and Agathe Meunier, Viaud competed in the 2014 Acrobatic Gymnastics World Championships. She also competed in the first European Games in Baku, Azerbaijan, in 2015.
