= Couples therapy =

Therapy for people in a couple relationship

Couples therapy session

Couples therapy (also known as couples' counseling, marriage counseling, or marriage therapy) is a form of psychotherapy that seeks to improve intimate relationships, resolve interpersonal conflicts and repair broken bonds of love. It may be used to address a variety of concerns, including communication difficulties, relationship distress, infidelity, mental health conditions, and major life transitions.

This article describes the history and development of couples therapy, its theoretical foundations and common therapeutic approaches, research in its effectiveness, applications with different populations, emerging practices and the training and qualifications of couples therapists.

== History ==
Marriage counseling first gained recognition in Germany and Austria following World War I. The first institutes for marriage counseling in the United States started in the 1930s, partly in response to Germany's medically directed, racial purification marriage counseling centers. It was promoted by prominent American eugenicists such as Paul Popenoe, who directed the American Institute of Family Relations until 1976; Robert Latou Dickinson, and by birth control advocates such as Abraham and Hannah Stone who wrote A Marriage Manual in 1935 and were involved with Planned Parenthood, as well as Lena Levine and Margaret Sanger.

It was not until the 1950s that therapists began treating psychological problems within the context of the family. Relationship counseling as a distinct, professional service is thus a recent phenomenon. Until the late 20th century, relationship counseling was informally provided by close friends, family members, or local religious leaders. Psychiatrists, psychologists, counselors and social workers historically dealt primarily with individual psychological problems within a medical and psychoanalytic framework. In many cultures, the institution of the family or group elders fulfills the role of relationship counseling; marriage mentoring mirrors these cultures.

With increasing modernization or westernization and the continuous shift towards isolated nuclear families, the trend is towards trained and accredited relationship counselors or couple therapists. Sometimes volunteers are trained by either the government or social service institutions to help those who need family or marital counseling. Many communities and government departments have their own teams of trained voluntary and professional relationship counselors. Similar services are operated by many universities and colleges, sometimes staffed by volunteers from among the student peer group. Some large companies maintain full-time professional counseling staff to facilitate smoother interactions between corporate employees and to minimize the negative effects that personal difficulties might have on work performance.

There is an increasing trend toward professional certification and government registration of these services, in part due to duty of care issues and the consequences of the counselor or therapist's services being provided in a fiduciary relationship.

== Basic principles ==
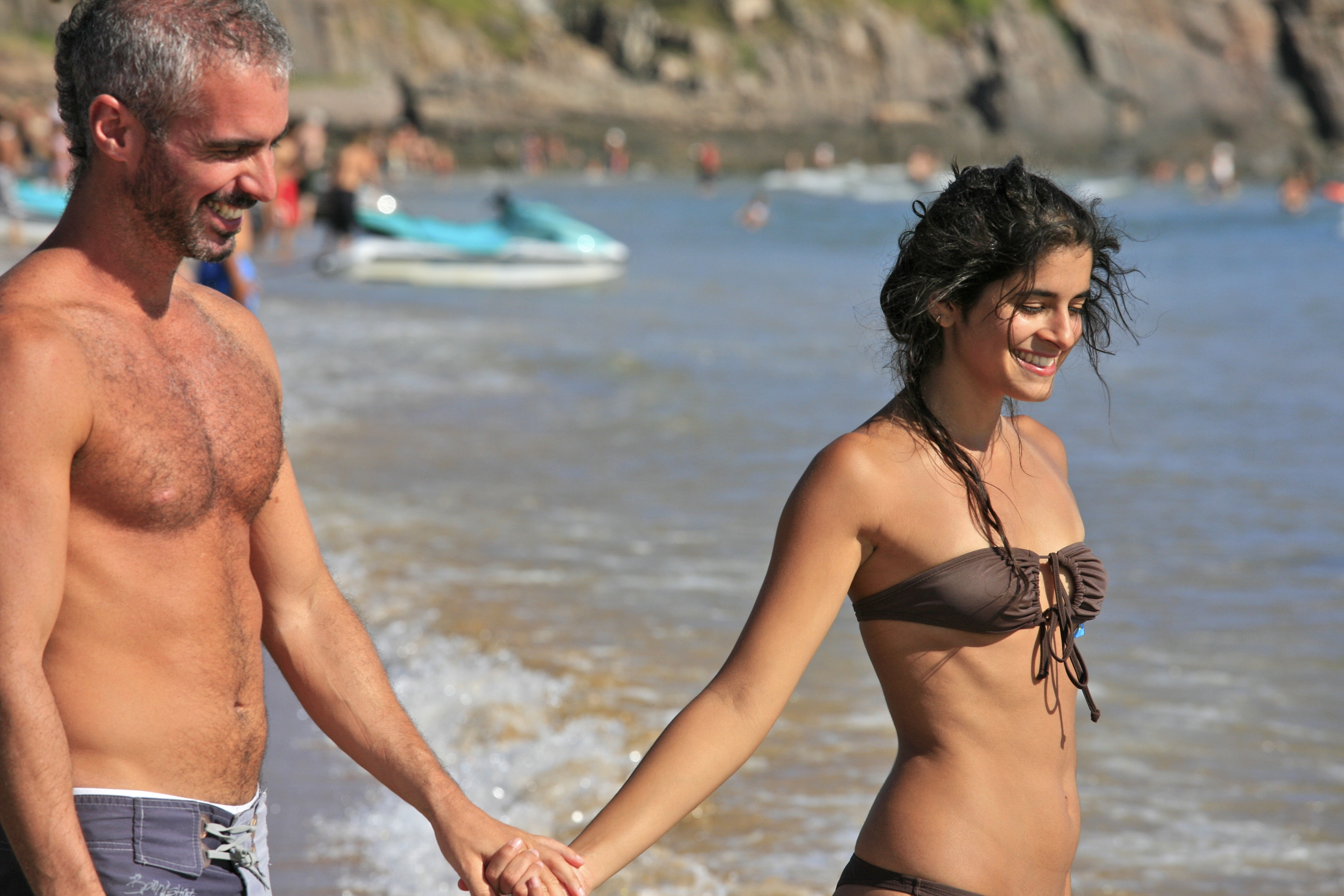
A happy couple at Punta del Este, Uruguay

The stats show that around 40% of all married couples in the US have divorced in the recent years, and it has been estimated that approximately 20% of all married couples experience marital distress at any given time. These numbers vary between countries and over time; for example, in Germany, only 35.74% of marriages ended in divorce, half of those involving children under 18. Challenges with affection, communication, disagreements, and fears of divorce are some of the most common reasons couples seek help. Couples who are dissatisfied with their relationship may seek help from a variety of sources including online courses, self-help books, retreats, workshops, and couples' counseling.

Before a relationship between individuals can be understood, it is important to recognize and acknowledge that each person, including the counselor, has a unique personality, perception, opinions, set of values, and history. Individuals in the relationship may adhere to different and unexamined value systems. Institutional and societal variables (like social or religious groups and other collective factors) which shape a person's nature and behavior, are considered in counseling and therapy. A tenet of relationship counseling is that it is intrinsically beneficial for all the participants to interact with each other,and with society at large with optimal amounts of conflict. A couple's conflict resolution skills seem to predict divorce rates.

Most relationships will experience strain at some point, resulting in a failure to function optimally and causing self-reinforcing, maladaptive patterns to form, sometimes called "negative interaction cycles." There are many possible reasons for this, including insecure attachment, ego, arrogance, jealousy, anger, greed, poor communication/understanding or problem-solving, ill health, and third parties.

Changes in circumstances, like finances, physical health, and the influence of other family members can significantly influence the conduct, responses, and actions of the individuals in a relationship.

Often, it is an interaction between two or more factors, and frequently, it is not just one of the people involved who exhibit such traits. Relationship influences are reciprocal: each person involved contributes to causing and managing problems.

A viable solution to the problem and setting these relationships back on track, may be to reorient the individuals' perceptions and emotions—how one views or responds to situation, and how one feels about them. Perceptions of, and emotional responses to, a relationship are contained within an often unexamined mental map of the relationship, also called a 'love map' by John Gottman. These can be explored collaboratively and discussed openly. The core values they comprise can then be understood and respected, or changed when no longer appropriate. This implies that each person takes equal responsibility for awareness of the problem as it arises, awareness of their own contribution to the problem, and making fundamental changes in thought and feeling. The next step is to adopt conscious, implement structural changes to the inter-personal relationships, and evaluate the effectiveness of those changes over time.

== Basic practices ==
Two methods of couples therapy focus primarily on the process of communicating. The most commonly used method is active listening, used by Carl Rogers and Virginia Satir. More recently, a method called "Cinematic Immersion" has been developed by Warren Farrell. Each describes a communication method intended to provide a structured environment in which partners can express and discuss their feelings.

When the Munich Marital Study discovered active listening was not used in the long run, Farrell argued that active listening did a better job of creating a safe environment for the criticizer to criticize than for the listener to hear the criticism. Farrell suggested that the listener often felt overwhelmed by the criticism and tended to avoid future encounters. He hypothesized that people may be biologically predisposed to respond defensively to criticism, and therefore the listener needed in-depth training with mental exercises and methods to interpret criticism differently. His method is cinematic immersion.

After 30 years of research into marriage, John Gottman found that healthy couples almost never listen and echo each other's feelings naturally. Whether miserable or happy, couples said what they thought about an issue, and "they got angry or sad, but their partner's response was never anything like what we were training people to do in the listener/speaker exercise, not even close."

Such exchanges occurred in less than 5 percent of marital interactions and they predicted nothing about whether the marriage would do well or badly. What's more, Gottman noted, data from a 1984 Munich study demonstrated that the (reflective listening) exercise itself was not associated with improvements in marital outcomes. To teach such interactions, Gottman concluded that it was ineffective as a therapeutic exercise.

Emotionally focused therapy for couples (EFT-C) is based on attachment theory and focuses on emotion as a central mechanism of change. According to the model, emotions reflect patterns of interaction that develop over time. As one of its founders, Sue Johnson described EFT as emphasizing emotional attachment and secure bonding between partners rather than focusing primarily on communication techniques.

Additionally, one study examined the effectiveness of emotionally focused therapy for specific populations. A controlled study of infertile couples reported that participants receiving EFT experiences significant reductions in depression, anxiety, and stress compared to a control group, suggesting that attachment-based interventions were associated with improvement in both emotional well-being and relationship functioning.

Imago Relationship Therapy, developed by Harville Hendrix and Helen LaKelly Hunt in the 1980s, is another communication-focused approach. The term "Imago" (Latin for "image") refers to an unconscious composite image of one's primary caregivers that Hendrix theorizes influences partner selection. According to this model, individuals are drawn to partners who embody both positive and negative traits of their childhood caregivers, unconsciously seeking to heal early relational wounds through adult partnerships.

The central technique of Imago therapy is the "Imago Dialogue," a structured communication process with three components: mirroring (reflecting back what the partner said without interpretation), validation (acknowledging the partner's perspective as understandable), and empathy (imagining the partner's emotional experience). This structured format is intended to facilitate structured communication by ensuring each partner feels heard before any response is offered. Hendrix and Hunt describe three relationship stages—romantic love, power struggle, and conscious partnership—with therapy aimed at helping couples move toward what the model describes as a conscious partnership."

While these approaches differ in emphasis—Gottman focusing on behavioral patterns and interaction ratios, EFT targeting attachment emotions and relational cycles, and Imago exploring developmental origins of partner selection—some researchers and clinicians have described these approaches as complementary. Attachment theory has been proposed as an explanation for why humans need secure bonds; EFT applies attachment theory to therapeutic practice by accessing vulnerable emotions beneath defensive behaviors; Gottman's model emphasizes behavioral interventions for daily interactions; and Imago Relationship Therapy emphasizes how childhood experiences shape adult relationship patterns. Some contemporary couples therapists use integrative approaches that draw from multiple therapeutic frameworks based on client needs.

== Research on therapy ==
The most researched approach to couples therapy is behavioral couples therapy. It is a well-established treatment for marital discord. This form of therapy has evolved into integrative behavioral couples therapy. Integrative behavioral couples therapy appears to be effective for 69% of couples in treatment, while the traditional model was effective for 50–60% of couples. At a five-year follow-up, the marital happiness of the 134 couples who had participated in either integrative behavioral couples therapy or traditional couples therapy showed that 14% of relationships remained unchanged, 38% deteriorated, and 48% improved or recovered completely.

Recent research has expanded the evidence base for couples therapy across a variety of clinical populations. A 2018 systematic review by Cochrane (organization) found that couples therapy can be a good option for treating depression when relationship problems are also present, but its not necessarily better than individual therapy. Although the authors concluded that the quality of evidence was low because of methodological limitations. The review suggested that couples therapy may provide benefits beyond symptom reduction by addressing relationship dynamics that contribute to mental health outcomes.

There has also been research examining the effectiveness of couples therapy for situational intimate partner violence (IPV). A systematic review and meta-analysis reported that couples therapy significantly reduced violence among couples experiencing situational IPV. The authors noted that additional research is needed before findings can be generalized, especially to more diverse or severe IPV relationships.

A meta-analysis published in 2023, covering 48 studies of nonrandomized couples therapies, identified influencing factors on the efficiency of coupls therapy in real-world settings. These factors include the age of the partners, the length of the relationship, and the type of institution that provided therapy.

Many studies about research on couples therapy can be found in Family Process Journal and Journal of Marital and Family Therapy, both published by Wiley.

== Relationship counselor or couple's therapist ==
Licensed couple therapists may refer to a psychiatrist, clinical social workers, counseling psychologists, clinical psychologists, pastoral counselors, marriage and family therapists, and psychiatric nurses. The role of a relationship counselor or couples therapist is to listen, respect, understand, and facilitate better functioning between those involved.

The basic principles for a counselor include:

- Providing a confidential dialogue, which normalizes and validates feelings
- Enabling each person to be heard and to hear themselves
- Providing a mirror with expertise to reflect the relationship's difficulties and the potential and direction for change
- Empowering the relationship to take control of its own destiny and make vital decisions
- Delivering relevant and appropriate information
- Changing the view of the relationship
- Improving communication
- Setting clear goals and objectives

As well as the above, the basic principles for a couples therapist also include:

- Identifying the repetitive, negative interaction cycle as a pattern.
- Understanding the source of reactive emotions that drive the pattern.
- Expanding and re-organizing key emotional responses in the relationship.
- Facilitating a shift in partners' interaction to new patterns of interaction.
- Creating new and positively bonding emotional events in the relationship
- Fostering a secure attachment between partners.
- Helping maintain a sense of intimacy.

Common core principles of relationship counseling and couples therapy are:

- Respect
- Empathy
- Tact
- Consent
- Confidentiality
- Accountability
- Expertise
- Evidence based
- Certification and ongoing training

In both methods, the practitioner evaluates the couple's personal and relationship story as it is narrated, interrupts wisely, and facilitates both de-escalations of unhelpful conflict and the development of realistic, practical solutions. The practitioner may meet each person individually at first, but only if this is beneficial to both, it is consensual, and it is unlikely to cause harm—individualistic approaches to couple problems can cause harm. The counselor or therapist encourages the participants to give their best efforts to reorient their relationship with each other. One of the challenges here is for each person to change their own responses to their partner's behavior. Other challenges to the process are disclosing controversial or shameful events and revealing closely guarded secrets. Not all couples put all of their cards on the table at first. This can take time, and requires patience and commitment to repairing the relationship.

Many couples delay professional help despite experiencing significant relationship distress. A descriptive study of veteran couples found that communication difficulties, lack of trust and external life stressors are the most common reasons couples eventually seek therapy. Many participants waited several years before seeking treatment and even attempted self-directed strategies to improve their relationship before consulting a therapist. This suggests that barriers to treatment and delayed help-seeking are common among couples and can contribute to worsening relationship distress over time.

== Novel practices ==
A novel development involves introducing insights gained from affective neuroscience and psychopharmacology into clinical practice.

=== Oxytocin ===
There has been interest in using oxytocin during therapy sessions, although this is still largely experimental and somewhat controversial. Some researchers have argued oxytocin has a general enhancing effect on all social emotions, since intranasal administration of oxytocin also increases envy and Schadenfreude. Also, oxytocin has the potential for abuse in confidence tricks.

A randomized, double-blind, placebo-controlled study involving couples affected by substance misuse found that oxytocin reduced physiological stress responses in women during conflict discussions but did not significantly improve conflict resolution behaviors or communication outcomes. These findings suggest that while oxytocin may influence stress regulation, additional research is needed before it can be considered an effective therapeutic intervention for couples therapy.

== Outside of heteronormativity ==
Differing psychological theories play an important role in determining how effective relationship counseling is, especially when it concerns gay and bisexual clients. Some experts tout cognitive behavioral therapy as the tool of choice for intervention, while many rely on acceptance and commitment therapy or cognitive analytic therapy. One major progress in this area is the fact that "marital therapy" is now referred to as "couples therapy" in order to include individuals who are not married or those who are engaged in same-sex relationships. Most relationship issues are shared equally among couples regardless of sexual orientation, but LGBT clients additionally have to deal with heteronormativity, homophobia, biphobia, and both socio-cultural and legal discrimination. Individuals may experience relational ambiguity from being in different stages of the coming out process or having an HIV serodiscordant relationship. Often, same-sex couples do not have as many role models of successful relationships as opposite-sex couples. In many jurisdictions, committed LGBT couples desiring a family are denied access to assisted reproduction, adoption and fostering, leaving them childless, feeling excluded, other, and bereaved. There may be issues with gender role socialization that do not affect opposite-sex couples.

A significant number of men and women experience conflict surrounding homosexual expression within a mixed-orientation marriage⁣⁣. Couple therapy may include helping the clients feel more comfortable and accepting of same-sex feelings and to explore ways of incorporating same-sex and opposite-sex feelings into life patterns. Although a strong gay identity was associated with difficulties in marital satisfaction, viewing same-sex activities as compulsive facilitated commitment to the marriage and to monogamy.

Research has also emphasized the importance of providing affirming and culturally competent therapy to clients in consensually non-monogamous (CNM) relationships. Studies indicate that therapists who demonstrate knowledge on CNM relationships and avoid pathologizing clients' relationship structures are associated with more positive therapeutic experiences. In contrast, biased and uninformed therapeutic practices have been linked to poorer treatment experiences and ending therapy early.

== See also ==
- Outline of counseling
- Counseling psychology
- Family therapy
- Interpersonal psychotherapy
- Outline of relationships
- Relational disorder
- Relationship education
- Sex therapy
- Social work
