= Blomquist =

Blomquist (Swedish for 'flower branch'; pronounced [ˈblʊ̂mːkvɪst]) is a surname of Swedish origin. Notable people with the surname include:

- Hugo Leander Blomquist (1885–1964), botanist
- Edwin W. Blomquist (1896–1963), American politician
- Michael Blomquist (born 1981), American rower and a former World Champion
- Rich Blomquist, staff writer for The Daily Show

== See also ==
- Blomqvist
- Bloomquist
