= Bloomquist =

Bloomquist (Anglicized form of Swedish Blomkvist, Blomqvist or Blomquist) is a surname. Notable people with the surname include:

- Paul Bloomquist (1932–1972), American pilot and officer in the Army
- Scott Bloomquist (1963–2024), American race car driver
- Willie Bloomquist (born 1977), American baseball coach and former player

== See also ==
- Bloomquist Creek, a stream in San Mateo County, California
- Blomqvist
- Blomquist
