= Agathe Meunier =

French acrobatic gymnast

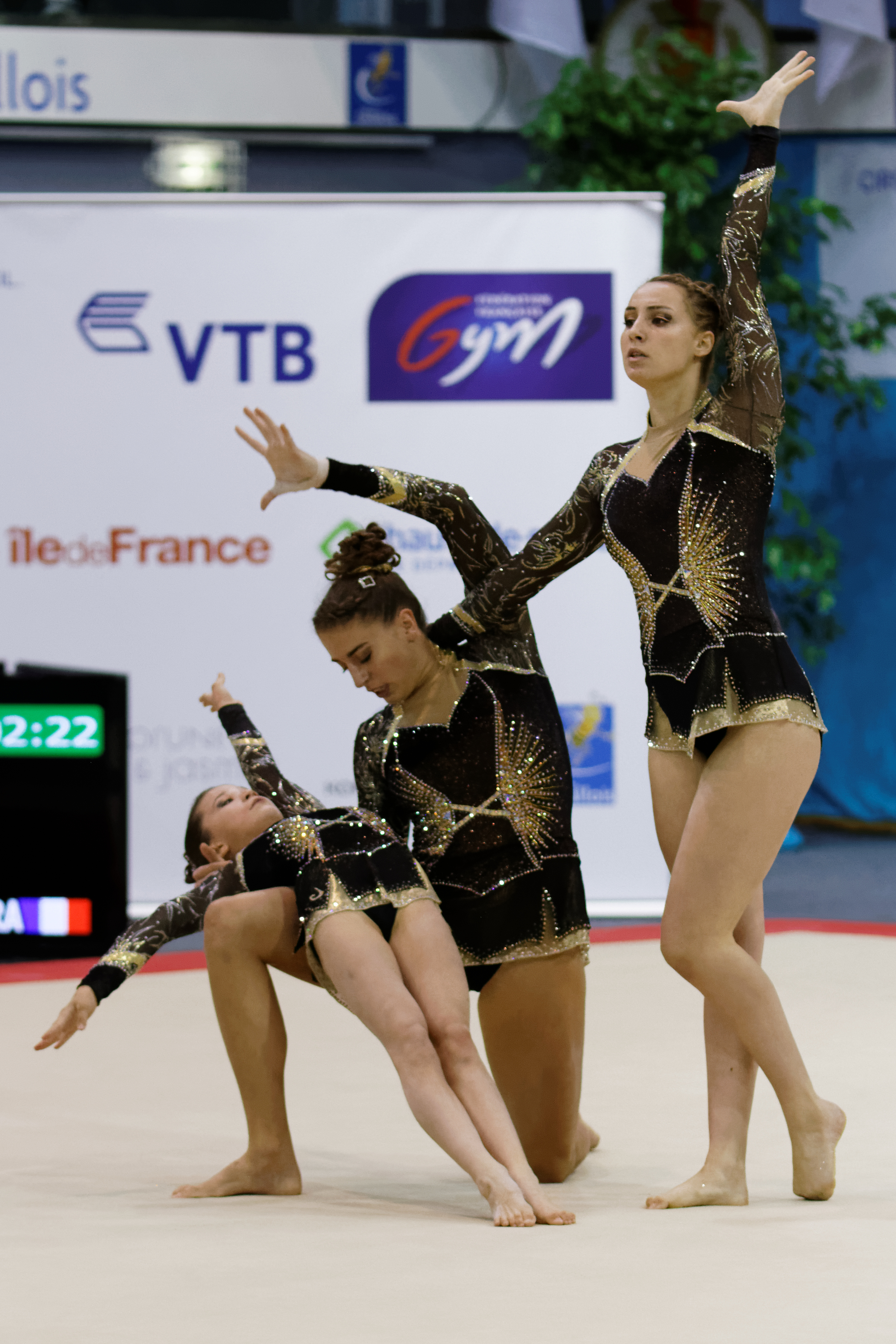
- Agathe Meunier, Laura Viaud and Léna Carrau at the 2014 Acrobatic Gymnastics World Championships

Personal information
- Born: January 9, 1993 (age 33) Fontenay-aux-Roses

Gymnastics career
- Discipline: Acrobatic gymnastics
- Country represented: France
- Head coach: Magali Philouze
- Former coach: Elizabeth Millet
- Choreographer: Pierre-Jean Gamard

Agathe Meunier (born January 9, 1993) is a French female acrobatic gymnast. With partners Laura Viaud and Léna Carrau, Meunier competed in the 2014 Acrobatic Gymnastics World Championships.
