= Lena =

Lena or LENA may refer to:

== People ==
- Lena (name), a female given name (includes a list of people and characters with the name)

== Places ==
=== Russia ===
- Lena (river), the easternmost of the three great rivers in Siberia
- Lena, Russia, a list of names of several rural localities in Russia
- Lena Cheeks, a stretch of the river Lena with peculiar rock formations in Kirensky District, Irkutsk Oblast, Russia
- Lena Pillars, a natural rock formation along the banks of the Lena River in far eastern Siberia
- Lena Plateau, a large plateau in Siberia
- Lena-Angara Plateau, a large plateau in Siberia

=== United States ===
- Lena, Illinois, a village in Stephenson County
- Lena, Indiana, an unincorporated community in Parke County
- Lena, Louisiana, an unincorporated community in Rapides Parish
- Lena, Mississippi, a town in Leake County
- Lena, Nebraska, an unincorporated community in Arthur County
- Lena, Ohio, an unincorporated community in Miami County
- Lena, Oregon, an unincorporated community in Morrow County
- Lena (town), Wisconsin, a town in Oconto County
- Lena, Wisconsin, a village in Oconto County
- Lena, South Carolina, an unincorporated community in Hampton County

=== Elsewhere ===
- Léna Department, a department of Houet Province in Burkina Faso
- Lena, Manitoba, an unincorporated community located in Killarney-Turtle Mountain municipality in Manitoba, Canada
- Lena, Norway, a village in Østre Toten municipality in Innlandet county, Norway
- Lena, Asturias, a municipality in the Principality of Asturias, Spain

== Other uses ==
- Lena (test image), a standard test image used in digital image processing
- Lena massacre, in Russia 1912
- Battle of Lena, in Sweden in 1208
- "Lena" (song), a 1982 song by the Belgian band 2 Belgen
- Leading European Newspaper Alliance, set up by seven European newspapers in 2015 to improve journalism in Europe
- "Lena", a short story by qntm
