= Alice Cossey =

New Zealand union leader and tailor

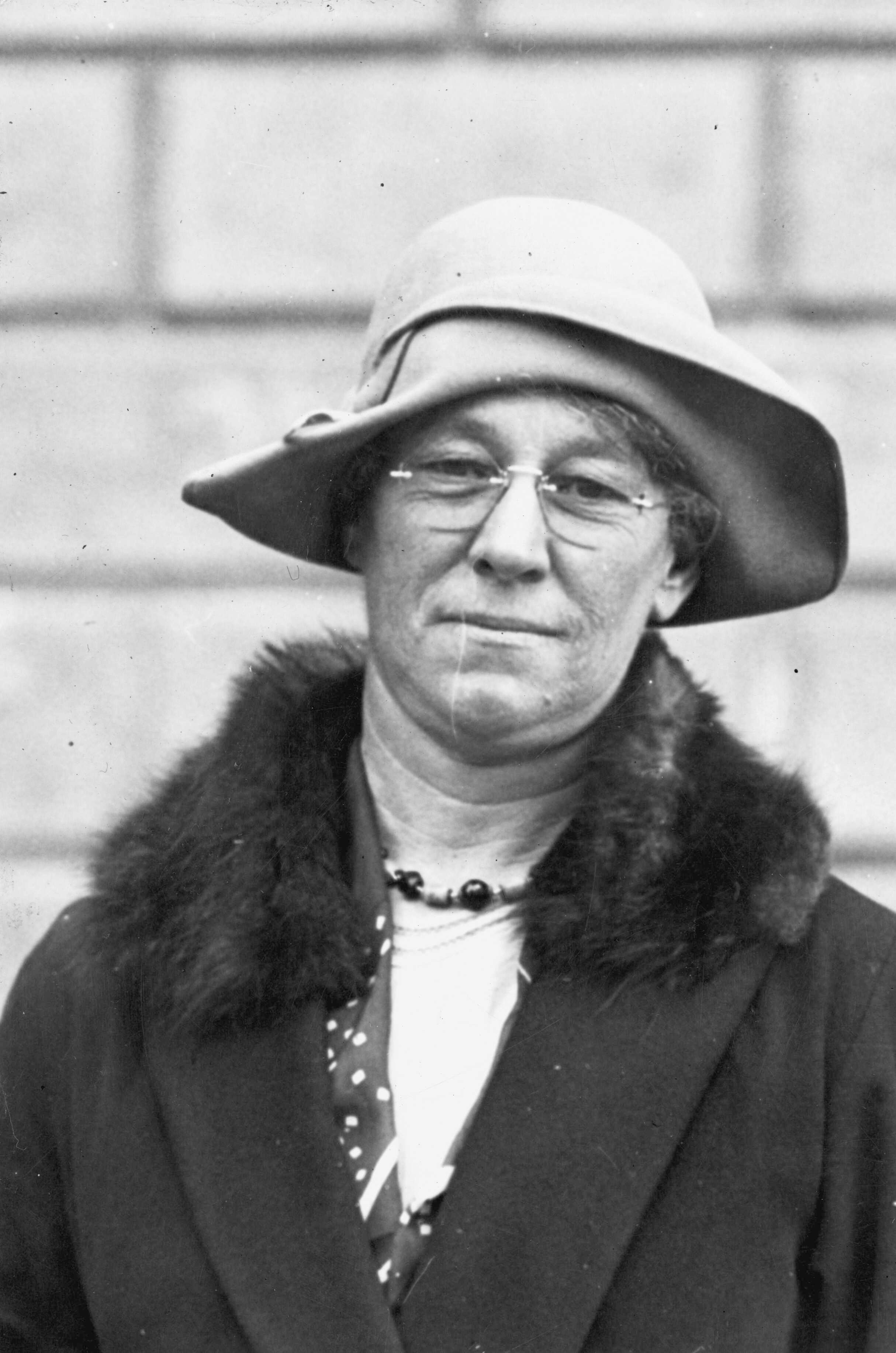
- Cossey
- Born: 8 November 1879; Drury, Auckland
- Died: 14 March 1970 (aged 90); Drury, Auckland
- Burial place: Drury, Auckland
- Occupation(s): tailor, union leader
- Organization: Auckland Tailoresses' Union

Alice Eleanor Cossey (8 November 1879 – 14 March 1970) JP was a New Zealand tailor and union leader. She was secretary of the Auckland Tailoresses Union for twenty-eight years, and was one of the first professional female unionists in New Zealand.

== Early life and education ==
Cossey was born in Drury, Auckland, New Zealand on 8 November 1879. Her father, Solomon Cossey, was a shoemaker. Alice was the eighth of nine children born to Solomon and his wife Martha Bragg. Cossey was apprenticed to a master tailor in Auckland. Cossey also attended physical education classes held by Sarah Heap.

== Union career ==
Cossey was one of the first professional female unionists in New Zealand. She was elected secretary of the Auckland Tailoresses Union in 1917, and held the position for twenty-eight years. Cossey collected union dues at workplaces once a month, with assistants Ada Anderson and Jean Sunder. She also led three national campaigns for the union. In 1920, she campaigned against the closing of the Department of Labour's women's employment bureaux, and she advocated for higher wages for women. In 1931 Cossey was made a justice of the peace.

Alongside Lena Purcell of the Auckland Retail Shop Assistants' Union, she was one of the most influential female unionists in Auckland until her retirement in 1945.

Despite her retirement, Cossey represented the Auckland Tailoresses' Union in the Arbitration Court in 1947 where she argued for equal pay for women. In arguing for higher wages for women, Cossey said that "personally, I think there ought to be equal representation in Parliament", arguing that "the time had got to come when women would receive wages equal to men. Women would see to it."

Cossey did not marry, and lived with her two unmarried sisters on Creek Street, Drury. She died in Auckland on 14 March 1970, aged 90, and is buried in Drury Cemetery.
