= Basten =

Basten is both a surname and a given name. Notable people with the name include:

- Alice Basten (1876–1955), New Zealand businesswoman and politician
- John Basten (born 1947), Australian judge
- Basten Caerts (born 1997), Belgian swimmer
- Marco van Basten (born 1964), Dutch footballer and manager
