= Lena L. Severance =

American mathematician, education activist, author (1855 – 1942)

- Born: 1855; North Hero, Vermont, US
- Died: 1942; Buffalo, New York, US
- Spouse: Frank Severance
- Children: 3

Lena Lilian Hill Severance (November 21, 1855 - September 15, 1942) was a female student mathematician at Cornell University, author of a book on equipollences, a world traveller, and an activist for educators.

She was born as Lena Lilian Hill in North Hero, Vermont to Henry C. Hill and Cornelia Scott Hill. She was a graduate of Oswego State Normal School (now SUNY Oswego) and then Cornell University, where she graduated in 1879 with a bachelor's in science and Letters in three years. Her thesis was on the theory of equipollences, which she would later expand into a book. She was "one of the most brilliant lady students at Cornell during her course". She also studied at the University of Strasbourg, France.

After college, Lena Hill taught in the Omaha High School (1879-84) and was a founding teacher in the Brearly School (1884-5), New York City. In 1881, she was a founder of the Association of Collegiate Alumnae (later renamed the American Association of University Women).

On August 19, 1885, Lena Hill married Frank Severance, a college classmate. Afterward, she assisted her husband in his work as the secretary of the Buffalo Historical Society (of which she was also a member), during which time he wrote several historical books about the Niagara frontier. Frank and Lena Severance were interested in international relations and travelled extensively, including several crossings of the Atlantic, Pacific, and Indian Oceans, trips through the Mediterranean, tours of Palestine and Syria, and visits to Europe, Africa, Japan, India, Burmah, and Java.

Lena Severance was active in several education issues. In particular, she was a leading force in obtaining passage of the first Civil Service pension law in New York State; legislation sponsored by her to give pensions to normal school teachers was adopted (this work led to the current New York State Teachers Retirement System, which is now one of the 10 largest public pension funds in the United States.). She contributed frequently to the American School of Oriental Research in Palestine (now the American Society of Overseas Research), and was a member of the Archaeological Institute of America. She also served on the National Educational Committee of the Association of Collegiate Alumnae, and was chairman of the New York State Committee of Educational Legislation of the Collegiate Alumnae Organization.

In 1930, at the age of 75, she revisited her undergraduate thesis and published an expanded version of it in a short book titled The Theory of Equipollences: Method of Analytical Geometry of Sig. Bellavitis. It was the only English language publication on equipollences at the time.
