= 2 Belgen =

Belgian pop band

- Rembert De Smet and Herman Celis in 1985

Background information
- Origin: Ghent, Belgium
- Genres: New wave, rock, pop
- Years active: 1982–1993
- Labels: Antler, Vogue
- Past members: Rembert De Smet; Herman Celis; Uli Kraemer; Alan Gevaert; Jean-Lou Nowé; Koen Brando; JPat Riské

2 Belgen was a Belgian new wave band, best known for their hits Opération Coup de Poing (1984), Queen of Mine (1985) and especially Lena (1985).

== History ==
The band was founded in 1982 in Ghent by singer-guitarist Rembert De Smet (who later also focused on synthesizer) and drummer Herman Celis. Their band name literally translates to 2 Belgians, which "was the only thing we had in common", as they explained. The duo recorded their first single Quand Le Film Est Triste with Lena as a B-side. Their debut album 2 Belgen was released the same year. When Lena became a hit, the group re-recorded it in different arrangements and languages. The 1985 version charted the highest. Their 1984 cover of Alpha Blondy's Brigadier Sabari as Opération Coup de Poing also became a hit, as well as Queen of Mine. Thanks to their success, 2 Belgen expanded with additional members, making them no longer a musical duo. Celis left to join Nacht und Nebel and was replaced with Uli Kraemer, who previously played with Tank of Dankzig. Other new members were Alan Gevaert (bass), Jean-Lou Nowé (guitar) and Koen Brando (keyboards), making them no longer a musical duo.

In 1993 2 Belgen split up. Rembert De Smet died in 2017, while Herman Celis died in 2021.
