= Lena Purcell =

Shop assistant, trade unionist (1898–1982)

Samuelene "Lena" Purcell (25 July 1898 – 20 December 1982) was a New Zealand shop assistant and trade unionist. She was born in Auckland, Auckland, New Zealand in 1898. She was active as a trade unionist from the 1920s to the 1970s and, alongside Alice Cossey of the tailoresses' union, was Auckland's most prominent female unionist during that time.

== Life ==
Purcell was born in Auckland, Auckland, New Zealand in 1898. Her parents were Irish immigrants who worked in tailoring, but her father is thought to have abandoned the family around 1900. Purcell did not marry, and remained living with her mother in Auckland until her mother's death in 1962. Purcell worked as a shop assistant from 1920, and in 1928 became active in the union movement, and by 1934 was secretary of several local trade unions, including the Auckland Retail Shop Assistants' Union, the Auckland Retail Chemists' Employees' Union and the Auckland Grocers' Assistants' Union, and the Auckland Grocers' Shop Managers' Union. Purcell acted as the union representative at the Court of Arbitration.

She was active as a trade unionist from the 1920s to the 1960s and, alongside Alice Cossey of the tailoresses' union, was Auckland's most prominent female unionist during a time when trade unions were overwhelmingly led by men. In 1940, she became vice president of a national organisation, the New Zealand Federated Shop Assistants' Association. She resigned her union positions in 1971, after accusations of inefficiency and the non-enforcement of wage claims, and died on 20 December 1982 in Milford.
