= Lena Ganschow =

German journalist and television moderator

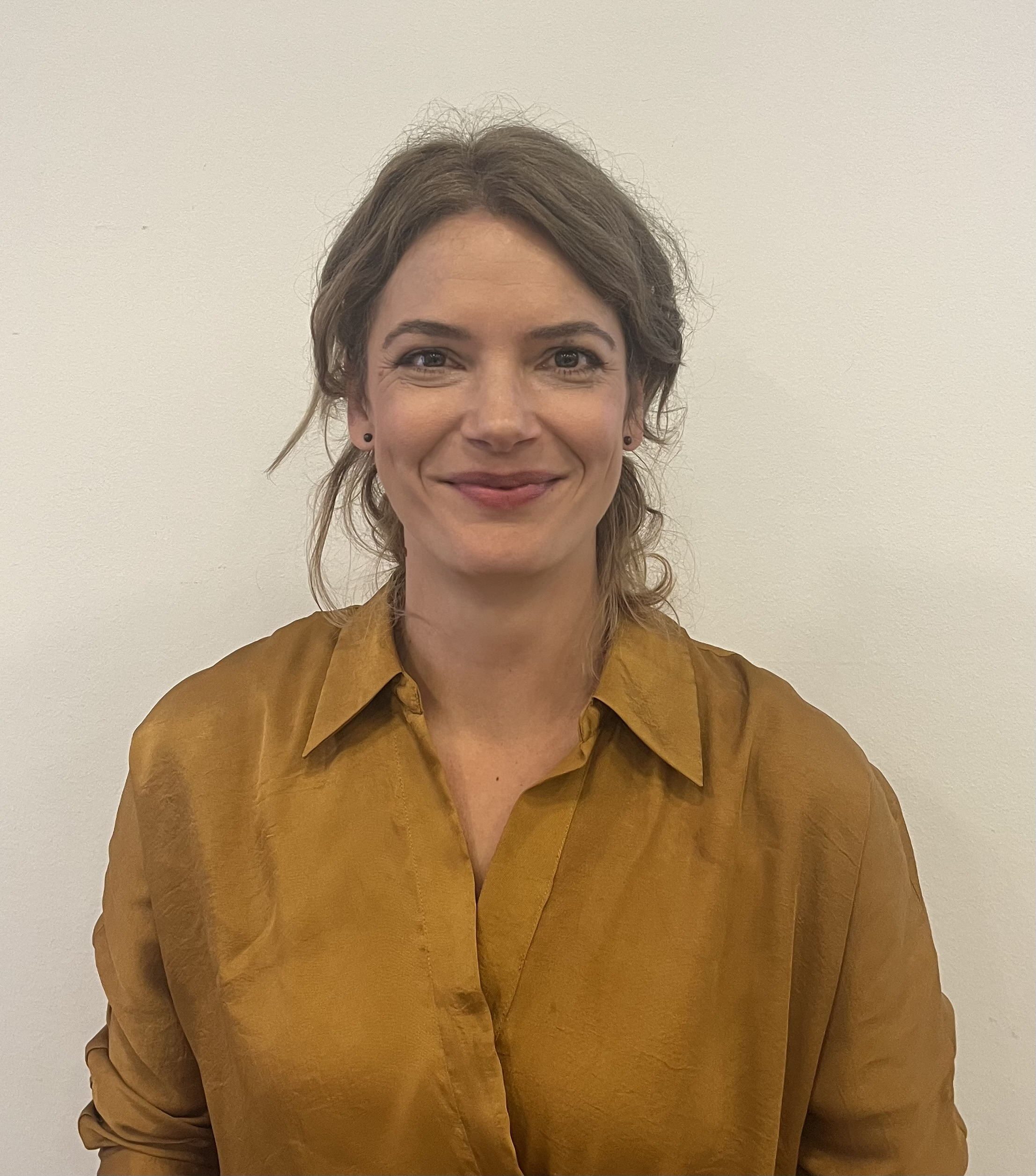
- Ganschow in 2025
- Born: 1980 (age 45–46); Hamburg, Germany
- Education: European School in Karslruhe; University of Tübingen; Tufts University
- Occupations: Journalist; Television moderator
- Employer: Südwestrundfunk
- Spouse: Yes
- Children: 1
- Website: Official website (in German)

Lena Ganschow (born 1980) is a German journalist and television moderator.

== Life ==
Lena Ganschow was born in 1980 in Hamburg, Germany and grew up there.

After graduating from the European School in Karlsruhe, Ganschow studied biology at the Eberhard Karls University of Tübingen and Tufts University in Medford, Massachusetts. She wrote her thesis at Christiane Nüsslein-Volhard at the Max Planck Institute for Developmental Biology in Tübingen.

From 2006 to 2007, she was a volunteer and from 2007 freelance at Südwestrundfunk (SWR). She worked as a reporter for the program odysso at SWR Fernsehen. In the documentaries Die Römer im Südwesten, Die Kelten im Südwesten and Das Mittelalter im Südwesten, Ganschow went back in time as a presenter in search of traces. In addition, she moderated the series Schatzsuche im Schloss together with art expert Frithjof Hampel at Das Erste.

From September 2012 to October 2015, she was a moderator for the show Kaffee oder Tee on SWR Fernsehen. On November 1, 2015, she succeeded Dirk Steffens as the presenter of the knowledge magazine Terra Xpress on Zweites Deutsches Fernsehen (ZDF).

Ganschow is married and has a child.
