= Lena Teschlade =

German politician (born 1988)

Member of the Landtag of North Rhine-Westphalia
- Incumbent
- Assumed office 1 June 2022
- Preceded by: Andreas Kossiski
- Constituency: Cologne IV

Personal details
- Born: 27 April 1988 (age 38)
- Party: Social Democratic Party

Lena Teschlade (born 27 April 1988) is a German politician serving as a member of the Landtag of North Rhine-Westphalia since 2022. She has served as co-chair of the Social Democratic Party in Ehrenfeld since 2021.
