= Lena Andersson =

Lena Andersson may refer to:

- Lena Andersson (author) (born 1970), Swedish author
- Lena Andersson (singer) (born 1955), Swedish singer
- Lena Andersson (speed skater, born 1954), Swedish speed skater
- Lena Andersson (speed skater, born 1961), Swedish speed skater
