= Kalobo, Southwest Papua =

Kalobo
- Village
- Location of Kalobo respectively in the Raja Ampat Archipelago and in Southwest Papua Kalobo (Western New Guinea)
- Coordinates: 1.055°S 131.06°E
- Country: Indonesia
- Province: Southwest Papua
- Regency: Raja Ampat
- District: Central Salawati
- Time zone: UTC+9 (WIT)

Kalobo is a village on the north-eastern coast of the island of Salawati in the Raja Ampat Archipelago of the Indonesia province of Southwest Papua. It is the administrative headquarters of the district of Central Salawati. The kampung of Kalobo has a population of 315 people, while the adjacent kampung of Sakabu and Wailen have populations of 327 and 162 respectively (according to a 2016 estimate).

Kalobo has been described as a melting pot. Originally established as a transmigration village for settlers from the overpopulated parts of western Indonesia, it has since expanded with people from nearby parts of Salawati. These include settlers from the village of Samate (who speak the Ma'ya language), as well as interior-oriented groups, some of whom are speakers of a language/dialect known variously as Banlol, Butleh or Metli, while others speak the closely related Kawit. At least some of the latter have come from the former village of Pakon, which was once situated nearby. This situation of diversity has enabled the widespread use of a variety of Malay (the lingua franca of the Raja Ampat Islands). Originally a language of interethnic communication, it has since become adopted as the first language of the people.

== Bibliography ==
- Badan Pusat Statistik (BPS) Kabupaten Raja Ampat. Distrik Salawati Tengah Dalam Angka 2017 (Report).
- Center for Regional Information and Studies (PATTIRO) (2013). Terhadap Pembangunan Pendidikan Dasar di Kabupaten Raja Ampat (Report).
- Leeden, Alex van der (1993). Ma'ya : a language study. Jakarta : Leiden: LIPI; RUL. ISBN 978-979-8258-01-5.
- Remijsen, Albert C.L. (2001). Word-prosodic systems of Raja Ampat languages (PDF). Utrecht: LOT. ISBN 978-90-76864-09-9. Archived from the original (PDF) on 2017-08-09.
