= Leena Mohanty =

Indian Odissi performer

Leena Mohanty is a leading exponent of Odissi dance, a disciple of Guru Deba Prasa Das. She is a recipient of the first Ustad Bismillah Khan Youth award, along with receiving the Mahari award, the Sanjukta Panigrahi award and is an empanelled artist of the ICCR. She is a choreographer and has performed internationally. She is the artistic director of Bansi Bilas, Bhubaneshwar, Odisha and heads the Odissi Department of Kalpana Dance Theatre in Kuala Lumpur, Malaysia, as well as the Trinayan Dance Centre in New York.

== Early life ==
Leena Mohanty was born and brought up in Bhubaneswar, Odisha, India to Rabinarayana Mohanty (Gurudas), a businessman and Swarna Mohanty, a poet. Introduced to Odissi dance at the age of four, she first learnt under Deba Prasad Das, one of the four first generation gurus of Odissi, but after the demise of her teacher she continued her training under Guru Durga Charan Ranbir. She still continues to perform and teach Odissi dance.

In 1984, she played the role of Lalita, Srimati Radha's faithful friend, in the Odiya movie Basanta Raasa (1984) directed by Gurudas.

== Awards ==
- Recipient of Ustad Bismillah Khan Yuva Puraskar 2006 from Sangeet Natak Akademi, New Delhi
- Recipient of the Mahari Award, 2006
- Recipient of Sanjukta Panigrahi Award, Patitapawan Kala Niketan, New Delhi
- Recipient of Junior Fellowship in dance from Ministry of Human Resource Development, government of India
- Recipient of Senior National Scholarship in Odissi dance from Department of Culture, govt. Of India
- Awarded the title Singarmani by Sursingar Samsad, Mumbai, India
- Empanelled artist of the Indian council of Cultural Relations (ICCR)
