= Lena (song) =

1982 song by the Belgian rock band 2 Belgen

- Canadian 7" single cover

Song by 2 Belgen
- Language: English, German
- Released: 1982 (first version), 1985 (second version)
- Genre: New wave
- Length: 3:59
- Label: Vogue
- Lyricist: Rembert De Smet
- Producers: Roland Beelen (1982 version), Walter Clissen, Rembert De Smet (1985 version)

Lena is a 1982 song by the Belgian rock band 2 Belgen. It was their biggest hit and is considered their signature song.

== Lyrics ==
The song describes a girl, Lena, for whom the singer still longs, even though they are no longer together.

== History ==
Lena was first released in 1982, produced by Roland Beelen. This version, with a different, more light-hearted arrangement, is completely sung in English. It was the B-side of their single Quand Le Film Est Triste and also appeared on their debut album 2 Belgen.

After 2 Belgen became more successful, the band re-recorded Lena in 1985, in a different, darker version, produced by Walter Clissen and band member Rembert De Smet. This version is partially sung in English, while other lyrics were performed in German. This time Lena became the A-side, with Dancing Thoughts as a B-side. It also appeared on their album Trop Petit. The 1985 version became a huge hit and is nowadays regarded as a classic, added to many compilation albums with Belgian pop music and still regularly given airplay on Belgian radio.
