= Lena Ruru =

New Zealand community leader, sportswoman, pianist and Māori welfare worker

Rina Matewai Ruru (5 June 1902 – 26 August 1977), known as Lena Ruru, was a notable New Zealand community leader, sportswoman, pianist and Māori welfare worker. Of Māori descent, she identified with the Te Aitanga-a-Māhaki iwi. She was born in Gisborne, East Coast, New Zealand in 1902.
