= Lena Jedwab-Rozenberg =

Polish-French Jewish writer

Lena Jedwab-Rozenberg (30 November 1924 in Białystok – 15 February 2005 in Paris) was a Polish-French Jewish writer who was evacuated to Udmurtia during World War II and wrote an extensive diary there in Yiddish language.

== Life ==
Lena Jedwab-Rozenberg was born as Leja Jedwab in Bialystok in northeastern Poland. She was the eldest daughter of Freyde Rive Ryba and Leib Jedwab; her younger siblings were Sore and Moyshe. Leja attended a school run by the Centrale Jidisze Szul-Organizacje (CISzO), which was aimed at promoting secular Jewish culture based on socialist ideals. It was there that her enthusiasm for her Yiddish mother tongue was awakened.

In June 1941, she traveled from Soviet-occupied Białystok to Druskenik in Lithuania, which was then part of the Soviet Union as the Lithuanian Soviet Socialist Republic, to look after children in a summer camp. They were disrupted by the German invasion of the Soviet Union. Since transport links had been destroyed, she could not return home. Instead, she was taken near the Urals to Sarapul in Udmurtia, where she lived in a children's home.

The evacuation to a place about 2,300 km from her hometown saved her life, but cut her off from all contact with her family and friends. After about three months, the children's home was moved from the town of Sarapul to the remote village of Karakulino. Lena stayed there for two years and attended school until she had completed the 10th grade, which was the prerequisite for university studies. After leaving school, she worked in a collective farm to earn a living and save up for her studies. Due to her excellent academic performance, she was accepted into the Moscow State Technical University in 1943. There she initially studied a technical subject, later languages and literature. She also worked as an interpreter at the Polish embassy in a department that looked after Polish citizens who had been sent to Soviet labor camps during the war.

After the liberation of Białystok from Nazi rule, Lena immediately tried to contact her family and friends there, but found out that no one was still alive. Her family members had been murdered in the Treblinka extermination camp.

She therefore decided to stay in the Soviet Union. When the persecution of Jewish writers, intellectuals and politicians initiated by Stalin began there in the autumn of 1947, she returned to Poland and continued her studies at the University of Łódź. She met Szulim Rozenberg, a supporter of the General Jewish Workers' League, and married him on December 27, 1947. Due to increasing pressure on the Bund to dissolve into the Polish Communist Party, the young couple fled Poland in August 1948 and eventually made it to Paris, where their son Samuel was born two months later. In the early 1950s, she and her husband fell ill with tuberculosis and had to spend long periods in sanatoriums. They ran a tailor's workshop and were eventually able to improve their financial situation. Their daughters Flore and Dorothée were born in 1957 and 1963 respectively. Lena Jedwab-Rozenberg was very active in Yiddish cultural life in Paris. She recited Yiddish poems and, together with Professor Yitskhok Niborski, made tape recordings for learning Yiddish. She died in Paris in 2005 after a long illness, her husband Szulim ten years later. In her honor, a room in the House of Yiddish Culture in Paris is named Salle Rozenberg.

== The diary ==
Lena, as she called herself in Russia, began her diary on October 8, 1941, in Karakulino; she made her last entry on September 6, 1944, in Moscow.

"Today I am still a student in the tenth grade of a middle school and am growing up in a children's home. Today I have to learn, read, acquire knowledge and observe life so that in eight or nine months I can go independently into the battle I want to win," she wrote on November 29, 1942, on the occasion of her 18th birthday. She dreamed of studying in Moscow. In her diary she described the external and internal struggles she had to endure in order to achieve her goal. From the perspective of a Polish Jew who had narrowly escaped annihilation, she also painted a picture of life in the areas of the Russian province not occupied by the Wehrmacht during the Second World War.

== Bibliography ==
- Excerpts from Lena Jedwab's diary in: Wolf Kaiser (ed.): The paper friend. Holocaust diaries of Jewish children and young people. Metropol, Berlin 2022, ISBN 978-3-86331-640-2, pp. 515–539.
- 1945–1941 ־ פון הײם צו נע־ונד: מלחמה־טאגבוך[Fun heym tsu na-ṿenad. milḥome-ṭogbukh, 1941–1945], Grou-Radenez & Associés, Pariz 1999.
- Girl with Two Landscapes. The Wartime Diary of Lena Jedwab 1941–1945. translated from Yiddish by Solon Beinfeld, foreword by Irena Klepfisz, introduction by Jan T. Gross, Holmes & Meier, New York [et al.]: 2002, ISBN 978-0-8419-1427-8.
- Sans feu ni lieu. Carnets d’Errance 1941–1945. Cerf, Paris 2012, ISBN 978-2-2040-9749-9.
- От дома к скитаниям: дневник венных 1941–1945 [From home on hikes: war diary 1941–1945], Knizhniki, Moscow 2019, ISBN 978-5-9953-0641-2.
- Albert Kaganovitch: Jewish Refugees in the Wartime Soviet Interior. University of Wisconsin Press, Madison, Wisconsin 2022, ISBN 978-0-299-33450-5
