= Lena Stein-Schneider =

German composer, singer, and pianist

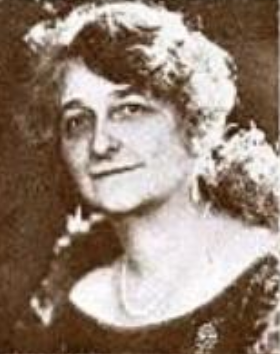
- Lena Stein-Schneider, from a 1928 publication
- Born: Helene Meyerstein; 5 January 1874; Leipzig
- Died: 17 June 1958 (aged 84); Munich
- Occupations: Composer, singer, pianist

Helene Meyerstein (5 January 1874 – 17 June 1958) was a German composer, singer, and pianist who toured throughout the United States during the 1920s and was interned in the Theresienstadt (Czechoslovakia) concentration camp during World War II. She performed and published her music under the name Lena Stein-Schneider.

== Life ==
Stein-Schneider was born in Leipzig to Pauline and Moritz Meyerstein. She studied piano and voice at the Leipzig Conservatory, then married Alfred Schneider, a merchant in Berlin. They had four children.

Stein-Schneider composed several patriotic pieces during World War I and dedicated them to the socially-prominent people who attended her musical salons in Berlin. She wrote both the music and libretti for several operas, and presented concerts throughout the United States in 1923, 1924, 1925, and 1928. Her opera Composer's Dream was performed at RKO Keith's Theater in New York. Inspired by the Rubenstein Choir she saw in New York, Stein-Schneider founded a Rubenstein Club in Berlin, as well as the Rubenstein Women's Choir, which she directed.

Stein-Schneider was Jewish and therefore banned from performing in public after the Nazis came to power. In 1942, she was deported to the Theresienstadt concentration camp, where she remained until the end of the war, when she relocated to Switzerland. Her health was so impaired that she was no longer able to play piano. She returned to Berlin and eventually received a compensation payment of 3,500 DM for the damages she sustained at Theresienstadt. She continued to compose, and died in Munich in 1958.

== Compositions ==
=== Chamber ===
- Abendstimmung, Op. 57 (viola and piano)
- Nocturne, Op. 53 (cello or viola and piano)
- Ritournelle
- Serenata, Op. 56 (viola and piano)
- Wiegenlied, Op. 55 (viola and piano)

=== Film ===
- The Struggle for Marriage

=== Opera ===
- Composer's Dream
- Der Luftikus
- Ein Hundert Kusse (One Hundred Kisses)
- Goldhärchen (Goldilocks)
- King Drosselbart (libretto by Wilhelm Ernst Asbeck)
- Lustige Liebe (Funny Love)

=== Orchestra ===
- Valse d'amitie, Op. 54

=== Piano ===
- Berceuse, Op. 52

=== Vocal ===
- "Avinu Malkenu"
- "Berceuse des anges" (Lullaby of Angels)
- "Chanson des abeilles" (Song of the Bees
- "Chanson des naims" (Song of Names)
- "Clip et Clap"
- "Danse l'herbe verte" (Green Grass Dance)
- "Der neugierige Kater" (The Curious Cat)
- "Des Kronprinzen Marschlied" (The Crown Prince's Marching Song)
- "Hinter dem Glanz deiner Augen" (Behind the Shine of Your Eyes)
