= Lenna (name) =

- Pronunciation: Len nah
- Gender: Female

Origin
- Origin: Old High German/Latin
- Meaning: strong as a lion

Other names
- Variant forms: Lenda, Leonarda
- Derived: Leonard

Lenna is a female given name. It is the English and Estonian female form of the Old High German male name Leonhard containing the prefix levon ("lion") and the suffix hardu ("brave" or "hardy"). The name has come to mean "lion strength", "lion-strong", or "lion-hearted". It may also be from the Latin Leo ("lion").

In Estonia, the name is in traditional use with, as of 2016, the oldest person living being over 80 years old. After not having been widely given, it has achieved popularity by the end of the 2000s.

== Name day ==
- Estonia: 25 June

== Notable people named Lenna ==
- Lenna Arnold (1920–2010), American baseball player
- Lenna Kuurmaa (born 1985), Estonian singer
- Lena Söderberg (also Lenna Sjööblom; born 1951), Swedish model, Playboy Playmate
- Anastasiia Lenna, Ukrainian model
