= Sarah Heap =

New Zealand pioneer educator (1870–1960)

- Born: Sarah Miller; 27 November 1870; Ashton-under-Lyne, Lancashire, England
- Died: 14 July 1960 (aged 89); Auckland, New Zealand
- Burial place: Purewa Cemetery
- Occupations: Physical education teacher, drill mistress

Sarah Heap (27 November 1870 – 14 July 1960) was a New Zealand physical education teacher and drill mistress who became the country's leading authority in physical education for women.

== Biography ==
Sarah Miller was born in Ashton-under-Lyne, Lancashire, England on 27 November 1870, as the daughter of Elizabeth Ann Dixon and Henry Miller. While little is known of Sarah's early life, she was already a schoolteacher when she married a master saddler by the name of Henry Heap on 30 March 1893 at Stalybridge, Lancashire. In 1904 or 1905, Sarah and Henry left England to live in Auckland, New Zealand.

In Auckland, Heap became widely known as an expert drill mistress for girls and physical education teacher. Although she tried to create a physical training college for women in Auckland, that effort failed and she decided to establish herself as a teacher. By 1908, Heap headed the physical training program at the Diocesan High School for Girls. In 1909 she was the visiting drill mistress at the Auckland Girls' Grammar School even as she was teaching at other secondary schools such as Mount Eden Collegiate. In 1910, she was giving classes for girls at the YWCA and the following year she began working part-time at the Auckland Training College (now part of the University of Auckland). By 1912, Sarah Heap was regarded as "the country's leading authority on the physical training of girls".

In 1912, Heap was the only female teacher appointed to an advisory committee reporting to the Minister of Education about primary school physical education standards. There, she played an essential role in shaping the country's new system of physical instruction and medical inspection, which was introduced under the Education Acts of 1912 and 1914.

In 1915, she was hired to a full-time position at the Auckland Girls' Grammar School where she remained until her retirement. There she developed "the most comprehensive system of physical training for secondary school girls in New Zealand. In addition to lessons in drill, where girls swung dumb-bells, marched and performed exercises to her piano accompaniment, she organised school games, took dancing classes and gave instruction in first aid and home nursing." Her classes evolved into a Saturday morning dance class which, in turn led to more dance lessons on Friday nights.

During the First World War, Heap took responsibility for training the grammar school squad of the Women's National Reserve of New Zealand.

Sarah Heap retired in 1931. She died in Auckland on 14 July 1960, twenty years after the death of her husband. She is buried in Purewa Cemetery, Block G Row 01 Plot 021.
