= Lena Zingsheim-Zobel =

German politician (born 1993)

Member of the Landtag of North Rhine-Westphalia
- Incumbent
- Assumed office 1 June 2022

Personal details
- Born: 15 June 1993 (age 33) Mönchengladbach
- Party: Alliance 90/The Greens (since 2013)

Lena Zingsheim-Zobel (born 15 June 1993 in Mönchengladbach) is a German politician serving as a member of the Landtag of North Rhine-Westphalia since 2022. From 2018 to 2020, she served as co-spokesperson of the Green Youth in North Rhine-Westphalia.
