= Léna Carrau =

French acrobatic gymnast (born 1997)

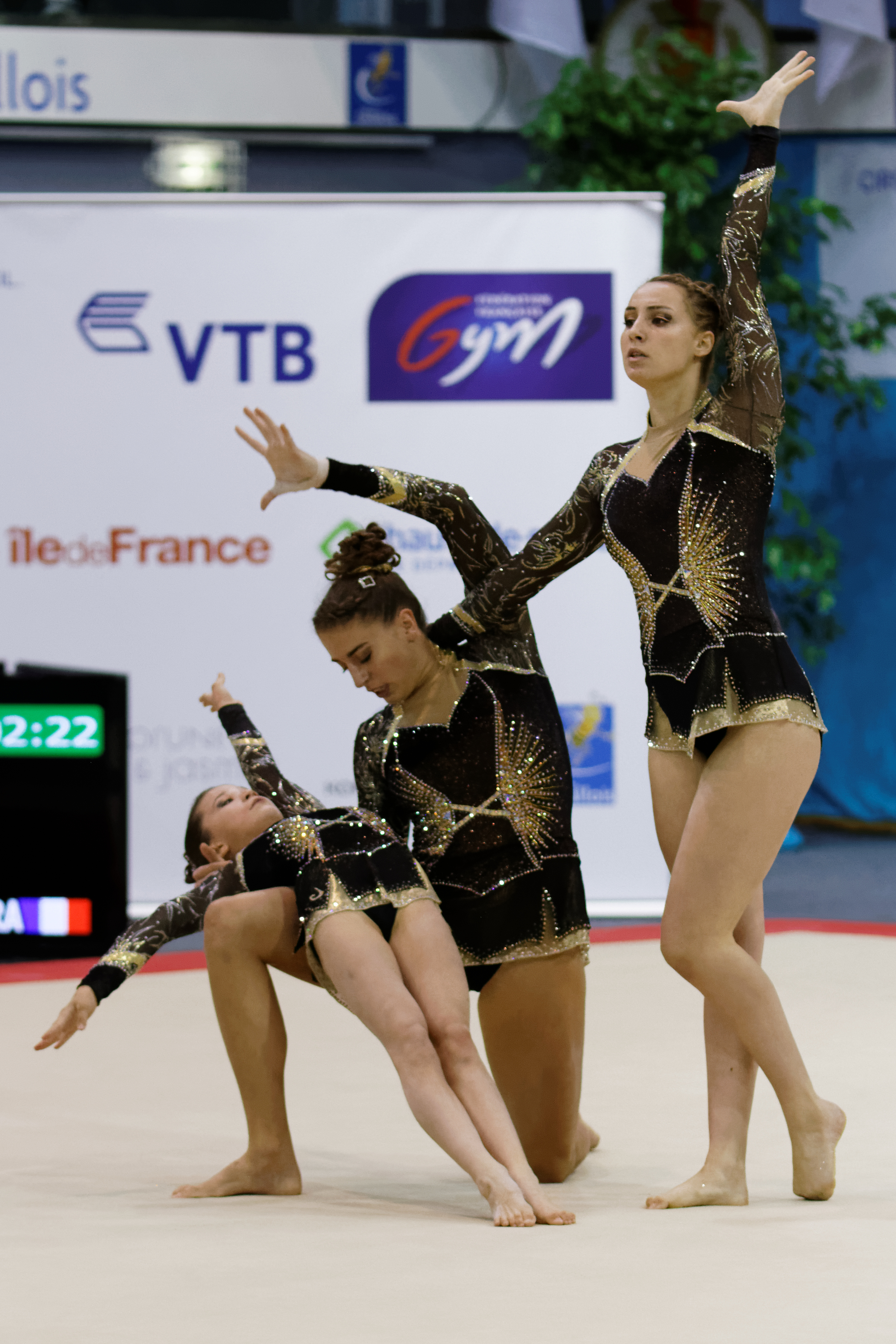
- Léna Carrau, Laura Viaud and Agathe Meunier at the 2014 Acrobatic Gymnastics World Championships

Personal information
- Born: July 4, 1997 (age 29) Bordeaux

Gymnastics career
- Discipline: Acrobatic gymnastics
- Country represented: France
- Head coach: Magali Philouze
- Former coach: Pierre-Jean Gamard
- Choreographer: Pierre-Jean Gamard

Léna Carrau (born July 4, 1997) is a French female acrobatic gymnast. With partners Laura Viaud and Agathe Meunier, Carrau competed in the 2014 Acrobatic Gymnastics World Championships.
