= Cosseys Reservoir =

Lake in the Auckland Region of New Zealand

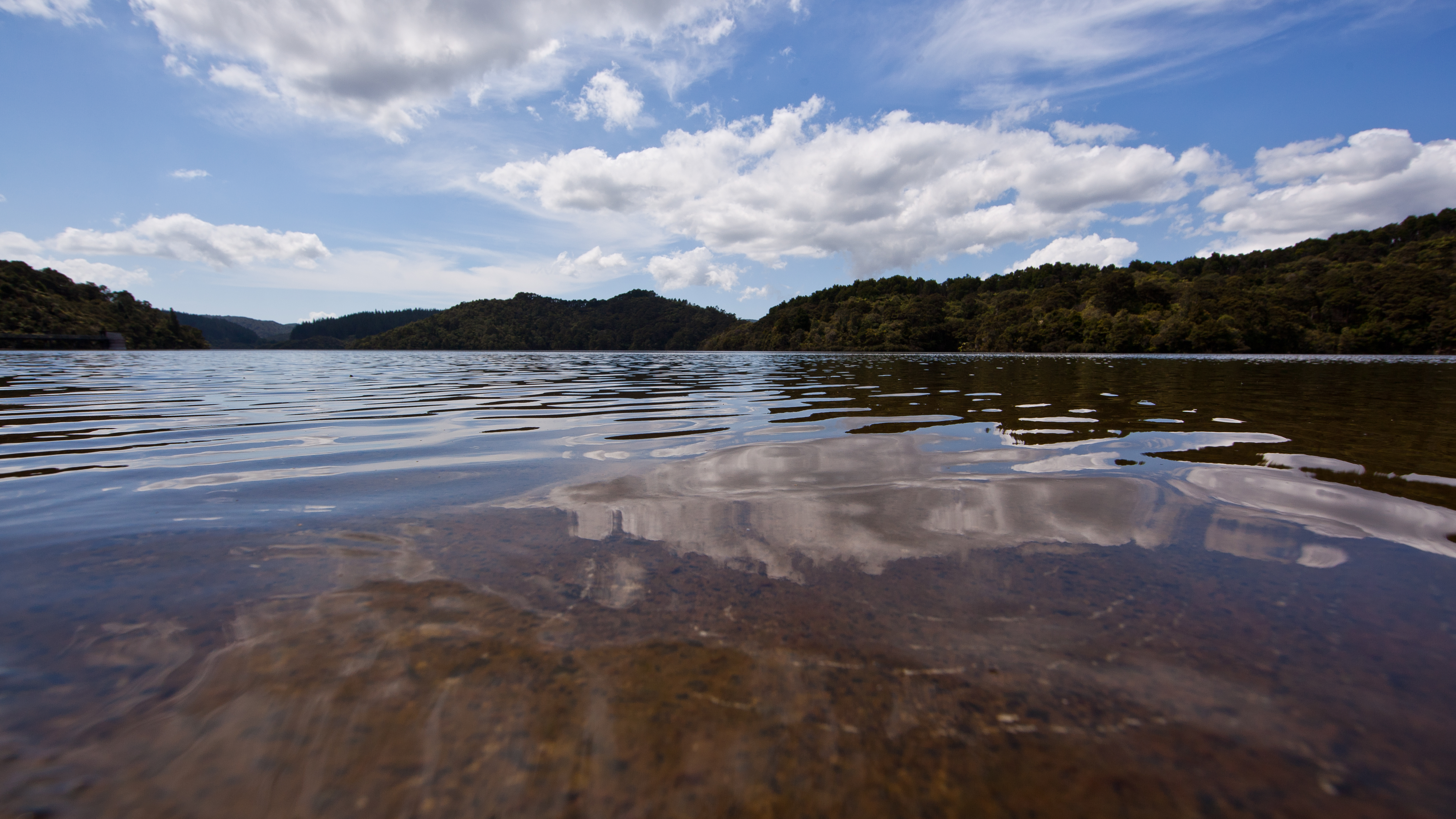
- Cosseys Reservoir

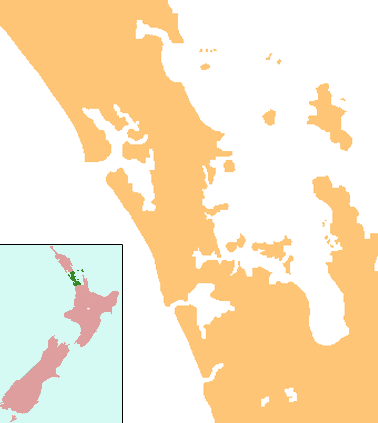
- Location within New Zealand Auckland
- Location: Auckland Region, North Island
- Coordinates: 37.057179°S 175.108506°E
- Basin countries: New Zealand
- Surface area: 1.23 square kilometres (0.47 sq mi)

Cosseys Reservoir is a lake in the Auckland Region of New Zealand.

== See also ==
- List of lakes in New Zealand
