= Lena Mellin =

Swedish journalist

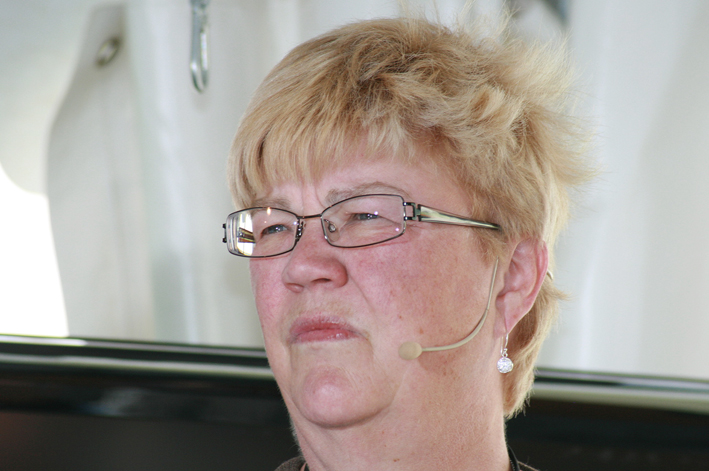
Lena Mellin in 2011

Lena Maria Mellin is a Swedish journalist and domestic policy commentator for Aftonbladet. She had earlier been the news director at the same paper. She won 'The Great Journalist Award' in 1996. Two years later in 1998 she was awarded the Lukas Bonnier Great Journalist Award. Mellin is also a recurring domestic policy commentator and writer for other media, among others in the book Makten framför allt, an anthology about Göran Persson.
