= Lena Ruth Stefanovic =

Montenegrin author and poet (born 1970)

Lena Ruth Stefanovic (born 1970) is a Montenegrin author, poet and literary translator. Her poems have gained recognition in Montenegro and abroad. She has also published a novel and short stories. She has served on the board of the European Writers' Council.

== Life ==
Lena Ruth Stefanovic was born in Belgrade, Serbia in 1970. She is a Montenegrin author, poet and literary translator, and lives in Podgorica. Her poems have gained recognition in Montenegro and abroad.

Stefanovic earned a Master of Arts in Russian literature at Kliment Ohridski University, in Sofia, Bulgaria and then went on to gain her doctorate in linguistics from the Pushkin State Russian Language Institute, in Moscow. She also studied Chinese language and culture at Beijing Language and Culture University, and is a graduate of the Gavro Vuković Diplomatic Academy in Podgorica.

She worked as an associate of the State Protocol in the Government of the Republic of Montenegro, and now lectures on Russian syntax in the Faculty of Philology at the University of Montenegro.

Stefanovic has published short stories, novellas, two collections of poetry and a novel, The Daughter Of The Childless One. Her poems are included in a number of anthologies. Other works by Stefanovic include the books Arhetip čuda (Archetype of Miracles, 2006) and Lo triumfo (2008). She collaborated with painter Biljana Keković, and designer Svetlana Lola Milicković to publish Radosav Ljumović (The Colour of Change), sponsored by the Montenegro Ministry of Culture. Stefanovic's poetry collection Zovem se Ilan (My name is Ilan) was published in 2022 by the Association of Writers and Literary Translators of Montenegro.

Stefanovic is a member of the Montenegrin PEN and served on the Executive Board of the European Writers' Council.
