= Frank Severance =

American historian

Frank Hayward Severance (November 28, 1856 – January 26, 1931) was an American historian.

Severance was born on November 28, 1856, in Manchester-by-the-Sea, Massachusetts. When he was five years old, his parents moved to Whitewater, Wisconsin, where he grew up and learned printing. After a year at Knox College, he went to Cornell University and graduated in 1879. He was managing editor of The Cornell Review, and in his senior year was one of the editors of the Cornell Era. He was the junior class poet and was re-elected for the senior year. His vacations were spent either in newspaper work or in travel. One summer, he worked as a book-agent; on another, after boating down the Susquehanna River, he hiked over 600 miles on foot in the Allegheny Mountains and Blue Ridge Mountains.

He was city editor and general utility man on the Erie Gazette for two years and joined the Buffalo Express staff in 1881. He was chairman of the committee on local history of the Buffalo Historical Society, member of the Rochester Historical Society, and a member of the Erie Natural History Society.

In later life, Severance became known as a historian, writing several works on the history of New York State. He was elected president of the New York State Historical Association in 1924. Severance died in Buffalo, New York, on January 26, 1931.
