= Lena Zagst =

German politician (born 1990)

Member of the Hamburg Parliament
- Incumbent
- Assumed office 18 March 2020
- Constituency: Hamburg-Mitte

Personal details
- Born: 15 December 1990 (age 35)
- Party: Alliance 90/The Greens (since 2017)

Lena Elleander Zagst (born 15 December 1990) is a German politician serving as a member of the Hamburg Parliament since 2020. She has served as chief whip of Alliance 90/The Greens since 2025.
