= Linna (surname) =

Family name

Linna is a Finnish and Estonian surname. Notable people with the surname include:

- Edvard Linna (1886–1974), Finnish gymnast
- Elina Linna (born 1947), Swedish politician
- Ivo Linna (born 1949), Estonian singer
- Miriam Linna (born 1955), American drummer, journalist, humorist and producer
- Väinö Linna (1920–1992), Finnish writer
