= Olov Blomkvist =

Swedish architect

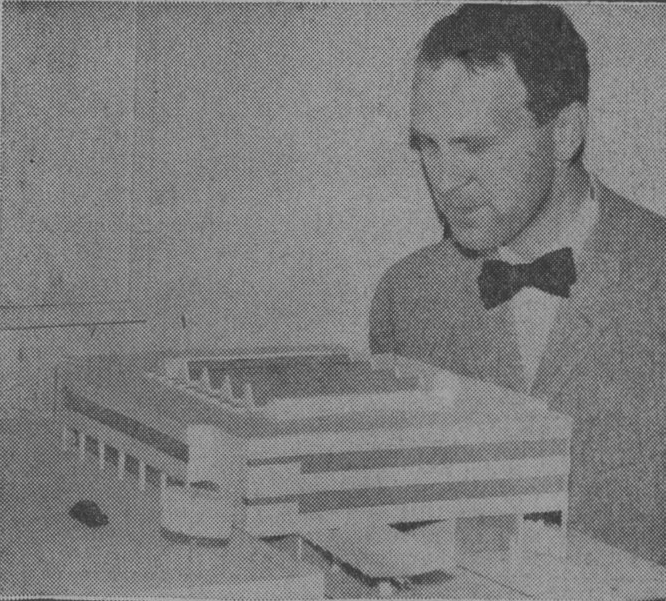
Olov Blomkvist with a model of one of his designs, 1962.

Bror Olov Blomkvist (29 June 1922 – 15 July 2017) was a Swedish architect.

== Biography ==
Blomkvist was born in Stockholm, Sweden. He is the son of Bror Blomkvist and Elsa Gustavson. He studied at KTH Royal Institute of Technology and graduated from there in 1952. He was hired at architect Nils Lönnroth (1912-1998) in 1953. Later, he worked for Stockholm tramways architect office in 1958. He was project manager for Kooperative förbundets arkitektkontor from 1965 to his retirement.

Amongst other buildings, he has designed the Västertorp and Brommaplan metro station.
