= Lena Lowis =

British author and scientific illustrator

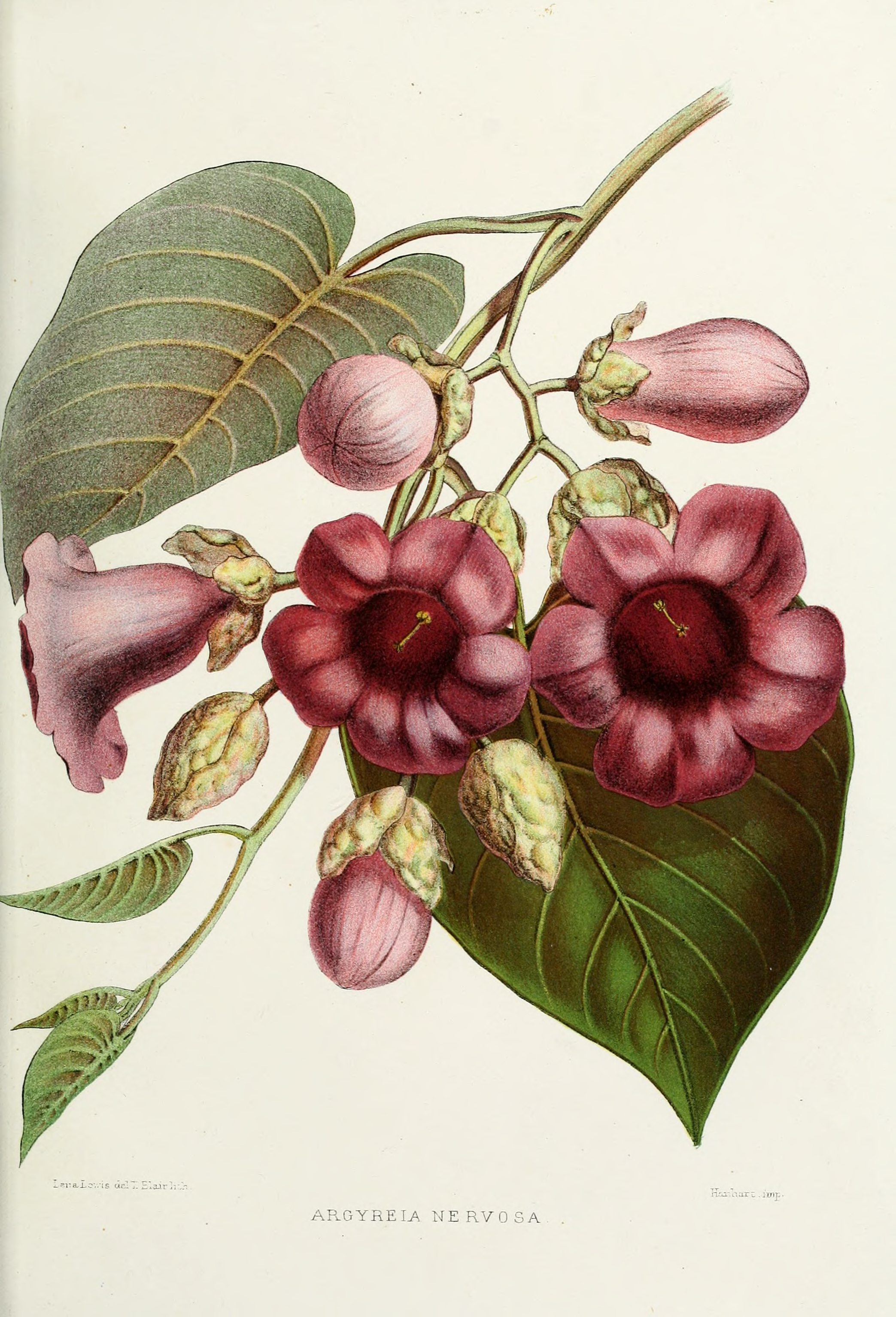
- Argyreia nervosa (Burm.f.) Bojer
- Born: Selina Caroline Shakespear; 3 November 1845; India
- Died: 18 November 1919 (aged 74); London, England
- Known for: botanical paintings
- Spouse: Ninian Lowis
- Children: 5

Lena Lowis (born Selina Caroline Shakespear; 3 November 1845, in India – 18 November 1919, in London) was an Indian-born writer, scientific and botanical illustrator, noted for her 1878 publication Familiar Indian Flowers which was advertised in The Times (London) in April 1881 as "with 30 coloured plates, 31s. 6d."

== Family ==
Lena Lowis was the daughter of Sir Richmond Campbell Shakespear (1812–1861), an Indian-born British Indian Army officer, who had married Marian Sophia Thompson at Agra, India on 5 March 1844. Their children were

1. Richmond Shakespear b. 5 Dec 1844, d. 12 Aug 1865
2. Selina Caroline Shakespear b. 3 Nov 1845, d. 15 Nov 1919
3. Talbot Powney Shakespear b. 29 Jan 1847, d. 1896
4. Edith Shakespear b. 18 Mar 1849
5. Sophy Shakespear b. 20 Jan 1851
6. Annie Shakespear b. 10 Jan 1853, d. 22 Jul 1898
7. Emily Shakespear b. c 1856
8. John Shakespear b. 1 Sep 1861
9. Richard Shakespear d. 12 Aug 1865
10. Minna Shakespear

She was married to Lt.-Col. Ninian Lowis (1838–1914), son of John Lowis, on 30 July 1868 at Horsley, Gloucestershire and they had a family consisting of

1. Richmond Shakespear Lowis b. 25 Jul 1869
2. Lt.-Col. Penton Shakespear Lowis b. 17 Dec 1870, d. 10 Oct 1931
3. Edith Shakespear Lowis b. 1873, d. 17 Jun 1874
4. Ada Shakespear Lowis b. 1874
5. Ninian Lowis b. 23 Aug 1878
