= Lena Levine =

American physician

- Born: May 17, 1903; Brooklyn, New York, U.S.
- Died: January 9, 1965 (aged 61)
- Other name: Lee Levine
- Education: Hunter College; Bellevue Medical College; Columbia University
- Occupations: Psychiatrist, gynecologist
- Spouse: Louis Ferber
- Parents: Morris H. Levine (father); Sophie Levine (mother)

Lena "Lee" Levine (May 17, 1903 – January 9, 1965) was an American psychiatrist and gynecologist. She was a pioneering figure in the development of both marriage counseling and birth control. She was a close colleague of Margaret Sanger. At the time of her death she was director of the Margaret Sanger Research Bureau of New York and consulting gynecologist at the hygiene clinic of Brooklyn Jewish Hospital.

Among the views expressed in her writings and lectures were advocacy women's right to sexual enjoyment, free access to birth control, and frank discussion of sexual techniques. One of her concepts was "an annual checkup on marriage" comparable to a medical checkup. Her frank advocacy of sex education and her openly positive view of pre-marital sex have made her a target of sexual conservatives to this day.

== Life ==
Lena Levine was born on May 17, 1903, in Brooklyn, New York, and raised in Brooklyn's Brownsville neighborhood. Her parents Sophie and Morris H. Levine were Russian Jews from Lithuania who immigrated to the United States in the 1890s. Morris was a successful clothing manufacturer.

Levine attended New York City Public Schools including Brooklyn's Girls High School; she received her A.B. degree from Hunter College (1923) and her M.D. from Bellevue Medical College (1927). She married fellow medical student Louis Ferber, who became a general practitioner while she became a gynecologist and obstetrician. Both did their residencies at the Brooklyn Jewish Hospital. She always used her maiden name professionally, somewhat unusual for the era. She then went on to study psychiatry at the College of Physicians and Surgeons at Columbia University.

She gave birth to two children. Ellen (born 1939) would eventually become an academic and small press publisher; along with Len Fulton, at Dustbooks, in the 1970s and 1980s, Ellen edited and published directories of small presses that led to the definition of small presses as a well-defined sector of American and international publishing. Michael (born 1942), had a severe viral encephalitis as an infant, which left him intellectually disabled; from the age of five he was institutionalized; Levine visited him regularly for the rest of her life.

Levine's husband, Louis Ferber died prematurely in 1942 of a heart attack. With her husband's death and her son's retardation, she gave up obstetrics, at least in part because, as a single mother, she did not want to have to deal with the need to run off suddenly to attend to births. Her housekeeper, Pearl Harrison, helped raise Ellen, and remained with the family until Levine died. Her interests also turned at this time to Freudian psychotherapy. She underwent analysis with Sándor Radó and opened a private practice at 30 Fifth Avenue, Manhattan while continuing her gynecological practice in Brooklyn, where she lived; she would eventually move to a brownstone in Greenwich Village and consolidate her practice.

Levine's interest in birth control dated from the 1920s, when she had met Margaret Sanger. In the 1930s she worked for the Birth Control Federation of America (later Planned Parenthood Federation of America) and became medical secretary of the International Planned Parenthood Federation based in London, and worked at the Margaret Sanger Research Bureau, where she became the assistant director under Abraham Stone. Sicherman and Green say that she was "probably more prominent as an international advocate for birth control than she was in the United States."

At the time she was becoming a psychoanalyst, she was already involved in marriage counseling. She was in a practice with Hannah and Abraham Stone, authors of A Marriage Manual (1935). After Hannah's 1941 death, Levine and Abraham Stone organized the first U.S. group counseling program on sex and contraception, under the sponsorship of Planned Parenthood. She later went on to run group therapy sessions for sexual problems and, according to Brody, "ran a consultant bureau for pregnant women." Sicherman and Green in Notable American Women say more straightforwardly that the Special Consultation Bureau included abortion referrals, illegal at the time.

An author and lecturer, who made quite a few appearances on American television and radio, her works included five books on marriage and sex problems (some of them with co-authors) and many pamphlets and papers on women's medical and psychological problems, both for lay and professional audiences, the topics that she wrote about. Her work was cited in Ernest Gräfenberg's original paper on the G-spot.

Politically, she was an ardent New Dealer; Sicherman and Green describe her as "sympathetic as well to socialist ideas." In 1964, she was one of the 100 women invited by then-Peace Corps director Sargent Shriver for a conference on Lyndon Johnson's anti-poverty program.

== Views ==
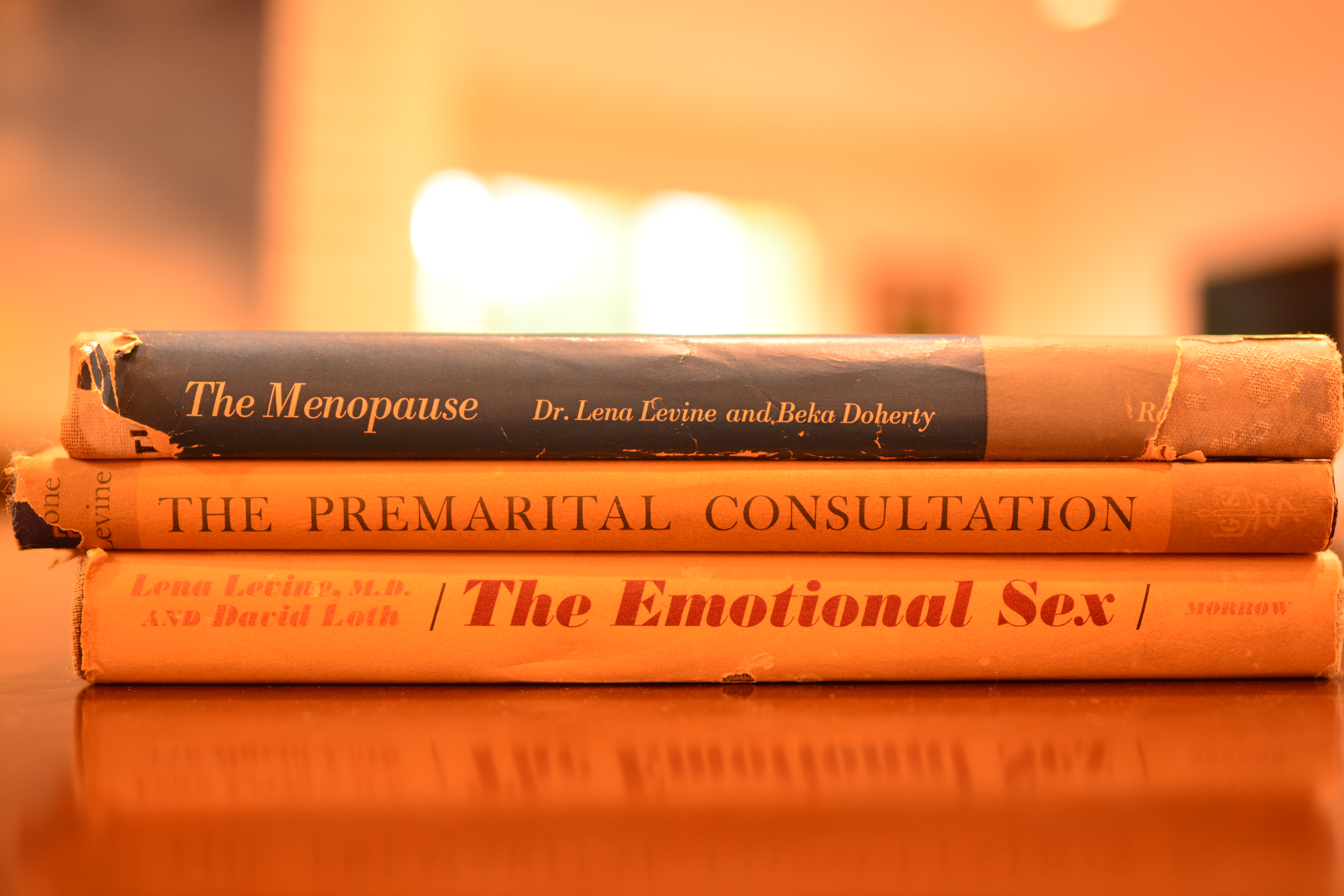
Spines of three books by Lena Levine: • The menopause, with Beka Doherty. Random House, 1952. • The premarital consultation: a manual for physicians, with Abraham Stone. Grune & Stratton, 1956. • The emotional sex: why women are the way they are today, with David Goldsmith Loth. W. Morrow, 1964.

Within the world of psychoanalysis, Levine was a mildly dissenting Freudian. On the one hand, she wrote that Freud's "great contributions...seem greater the more later scholars build upon them"; on the other:

Because Freud was a product of a heavily patriarchal society, his allegation that the castration complex and penis envy are inevitable seemed to have more foundation in his own time than it does now. ... Later researchers have contributed theories that do not coincide completely with Freud's. They describe personality development in terms of emotional security and maturity rather than libidinal satisfactions.

Levine lived through the early portion of the sexual revolution, died just as second-wave feminism was getting under way, and did not live to see heteronormativity called into question. Her own writings are, in many ways, precursors to (or early examples of) difference feminism.

The fundamental fact about woman is that she is a female person. Femaleness is a biological fact. Femininity is a term whose meaning, defined by society is constantly changing. It is time to scrap it. It is time to recognize woman as a distinct personality, different from man mainly in that she has a special function in bearing, delivering, and nursing children, while he is stronger muscularly.

While she wrote, "The emotional differences between men and women are largely created by society not anatomy.", she defended the more "emotional", "intuitive", "warmhearted" female personality: the changing role of women and the decline of patriarchy "does not mean that [woman] must try to acquire [male] feelings."

She believed in the importance both of being honest to oneself about one's feelings and of controlling their expression: "reasonable restraint" rather than "complete suppression" of one's feelings. She puts this in motherly terms by saying that one should say to a child, "I know how angry you are at your baby sister, but don't poke her eye out," acknowledging the child's anger, while insisting that the child must control its expression. Mastering expression of strong feelings may be difficult but "...who promised you that life would be easy?"

Levine was very open in terms of what sexual acts may be appropriate within a marriage—"Because mutual sexual desire in marriage is so enjoyable, anything that furthers it is worth trying and anything that blocks it should be avoided. ... Any and every form of stimulation which can arouse desire in the partner who does not have it when the other does should be used,"—but considered that a marriage based on "mature love" should be a universal goal: "A single woman, her family, and her friends may give many reasons why she never married ... [b]ut under scrutiny they turn out to be excuses..." "Most women have always known that their most important role as adults would be that of wife and mother." At the same time, she was extremely suspicious of the cliches of romantic love, "pseudo-love... [in which] the loved one is idolized beyond reasonable limits."

In traditional marriage, she wrote, two people become "'man and wife'... The man remains a man; the woman becomes a wife. ... [H]e is still a person, but she is mainly a role." As the role of woman in marriage was evolving from that of a "helpmeet" to that of a "partner", she believed that women's new role was still a matter of some contention. "The real goal of marriage... is for each to take on a new role while retaining individuality."

Levine wrote that "...the emergence of women as sex partners with equal desire has led more and more women to follow the male pattern of sexual behavior," and called for a greater symmetry of expectations; for example, "If a woman is supposed to condone infidelity in a man, why should he not be expected to condone it in her?" Still, she very much saw marriage as the proper locus for sexuality: "Consummation when the emotions are not engaged is a lonely pleasure...", "Infidelity never solved a marriage problem yet..." She perceived an increase in non-marital sex in her time, and saw it almost entirely as a harmless prelude to marriage. "Generally speaking, in America today premarital experience makes little difference either way. Eventually, no doubt the question will become entirely academic." Her support for sex education was always in the context of preparation for marriage.

Her views on homosexuality were not censorious, but were still a far cry from those of second-wave feminism a few years later. Estimating Lesbians at "perhaps 2 percent of the population," she wrote, "[T]here are women who live in a homosexual relationship with another woman and are quite content with it. As with male homosexuals, all they want is to be let alone. The Lesbian is less bothered by the authorities than her male counterpart... Lesbians who are not outrageously offensive in their behavior are almost never arrested."

== Works ==
- The Doctor Talks With the Bride (pamphlet). Planned Parenthood Federation of America (Second Edition 1938)
- The menopause, with Beka Doherty. Random House, 1952.
- The premarital consultation: a manual for physicians, with Abraham Stone. Grune & Stratton, 1956.
- The modern book of marriage: A practical guide to marital happiness. Bartholomew House, 1957.
- The frigid wife; her way to sexual fulfillment, with David Goldsmith Loth. Messner, 1962.
- The emotional sex: why women are the way they are today, with David Goldsmith Loth. W. Morrow, 1964.
