= Lena Blomkvist =

Swedish football defender

Personal information
- Full name: Lena Kristina Blomkvist
- Date of birth: 19 October 1990 (age 36)
- Place of birth: Rosvik, Sweden,
- Height: 1.69 m (5 ft 6 1/2 in)
- Position: Defender

Senior career*
Years	Team	Apps	(Gls)
2009–2020	Piteå IF	175	(4)
- * Club domestic league appearances and goals

Lena Blomkvist (born 19 October 1990) is a Swedish football defender who played for Piteå IF in the Damallsvenskan.
