= Lena Kreck =

German politician

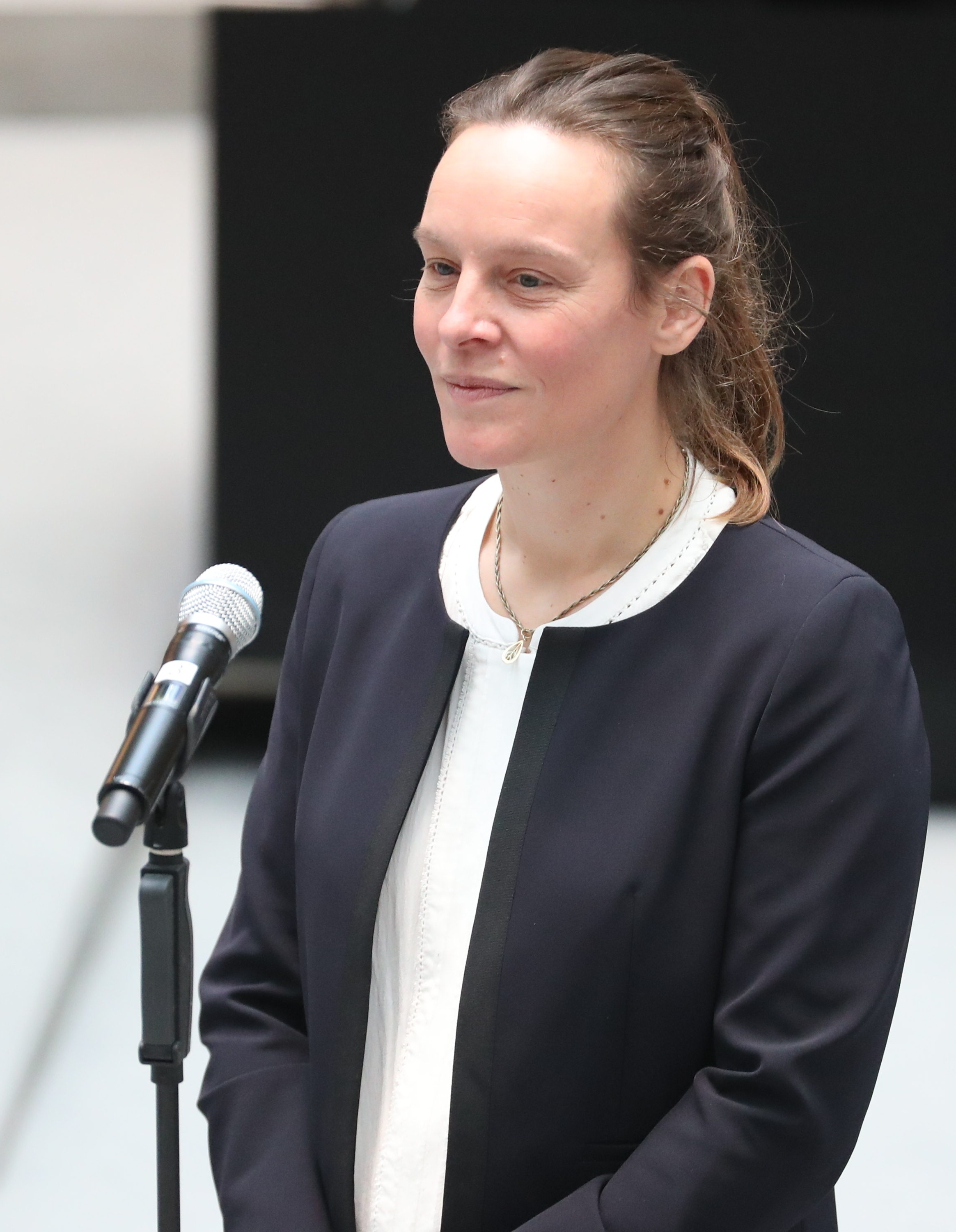
- Kreck in 2021

Senator for Justice, Diversity and Anti-Discrimination of Berlin
- Incumbent
- Assumed office 21 December 2021
- Governing Mayor: Franziska Giffey
- Preceded by: Dirk Behrendt

Personal details
- Born: Lena Kreck; 23 January 1981 (age 45)
- Party: The Left
- Education: Humboldt University of Berlin; University of Bremen

Lena Kreck (born 23 January 1981) is a German lawyer and professor at the Evangelische Hochschule Berlin. She has served as Senator for Justice, Diversity and Anti-Discrimination in the Berlin state government since December 2021, representing The Left.

== Legal career ==
Kreck studied law at the Humboldt University of Berlin and earned her doctorate at the Center for European Legal Policy at the University of Bremen with the thesis "Options and limits of legal protection for environmental refugees". After completing her legal clerkship, Kreck worked, among other things, as a lawyer at the LGBT counseling center in Berlin, where she assisted with the needs of refugees.

Kreck worked for two semesters as a substitute professor in the subject of law in social work at the Koblenz University of Applied Sciences. In October 2019, she was appointed professor of social work at the Evangelische Hochschule Berlin, with a focus on "law and society".

== Political career ==
During 2007–08, Kreck was one of the federal co-spokespersons for Left Youth Solid, the newly unified youth association of The Left. She twice ran for youth policy spokesperson of the party, first in 2007 and again in 2009, but lost both times; first to Sascha Wagener and then to Niema Movassat.

In October 2019, at the suggestion of The Left parliamentary group, Kreck was proposed as a justice in the Berlin State Constitution Court before the Abgeordnetenhaus of Berlin. However, she fell short of the required two-thirds majority approval. The left-wing coalition government accused the Christian Democratic Union of abstaining from the vote despite pledging to confirm Kreck, though this could not be proven due to the secret ballot and lack of comment from the CDU.

After in the 2021 Berlin state election, Kreck was appointed Senator for Justice, Diversity and Anti-Discrimination in the Giffey senate. Kreck is considered close to the libertarian socialist Emancipatory Left current within the party, and served alongside Katja Kipping on the editorial board of the group's former journal Prague Spring. Kreck supports the prison abolition movement.
