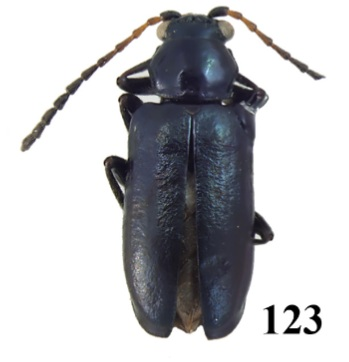

Scientific classification
- Kingdom: Animalia
- Phylum: Arthropoda
- Clade: Pancrustacea
- Class: Insecta
- Order: Coleoptera
- Suborder: Polyphaga
- Infraorder: Cucujiformia
- Family: Chrysomelidae
- Genus: Pseudoluperus; Beller and Hatch, 1932
- Species: P. longulus

Binomial name
- Pseudoluperus longulus (LeConte, 1857)

Synonyms
- Luperus longulus LeConte, 1857; Pseudoluperus bakeri Beller & Hatch, 1932; Scelolyperus decipiens Horn, 1893

= Pseudoluperus =

Genus of beetles

Pseudoluperus is a genus of leaf beetles in the family Chrysomelidae. It is monotypic, being represented by the single species, Pseudoluperus longulus, which is found in North America.

== Taxonomy ==
In the catalogue of Wilcox (1973), Pseudoluperus constituted a heterogeneous assemblage of all sorts of Scelidites (and even a species from another section). Subsequent to that catalogue, Andrews & Gilbert (2005) added one more species to the genus, transferring Luperodes histrio from the genus Keitheatus. Species formerly included in Pseudoluperus have been transferred to the following genera: Microscelida, Scelolyperus, Synetocephalus, Amplioluperus, Cornuventer, Geethaluperus, Mexiluperus, Monoaster, Texiluperus and Trichobrotica. Furthermore, Pseudoluperus bakeri and P. decipiens have been reduced to synonyms of P. longulus, making Pseudoluperus monotypic.
