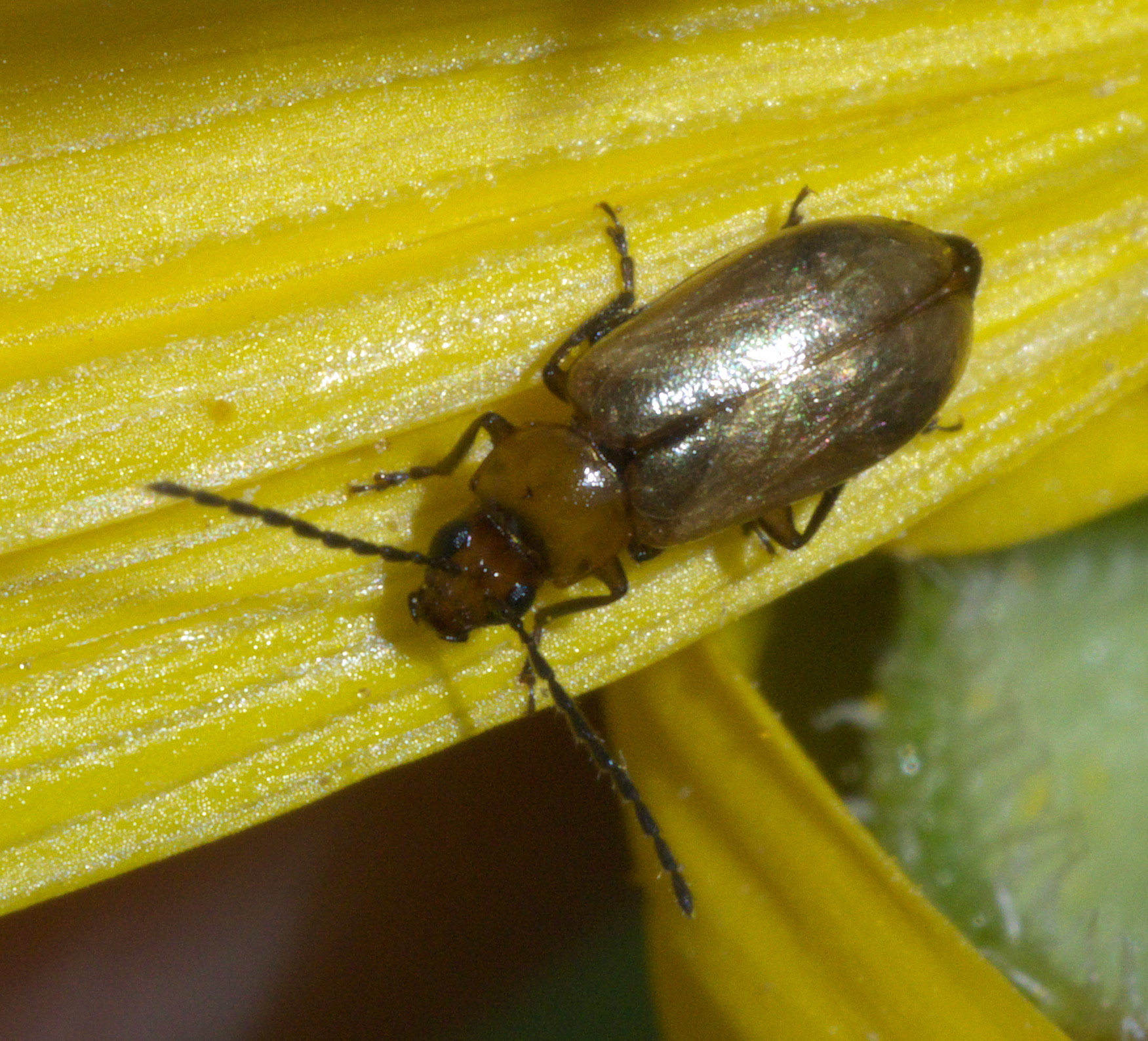
- Metrioidea sp., Texas

Scientific classification
- Kingdom: Animalia
- Phylum: Arthropoda
- Clade: Pancrustacea
- Class: Insecta
- Order: Coleoptera
- Suborder: Polyphaga
- Infraorder: Cucujiformia
- Family: Chrysomelidae
- Subfamily: Galerucinae
- Tribe: Luperini
- Subtribe: Luperina
- Genus: Metrioidea; Fairmaire, 1881

Type species
- Metrioidea signatipennis Fairmaire, 1881

= Metrioidea =

Genus of beetles

Metrioidea is a genus of skeletonizing leaf beetles in the family Chrysomelidae. It is found in Fiji and New Caledonia. Additional species attributed to the genus are known from the Nearctic, Neotropical and Indomalayan realms, but these may actually belong to other genera. Metrioidea species from the New World are very similar to those in the genera Lilophaea, Luperodes and Monolepta.

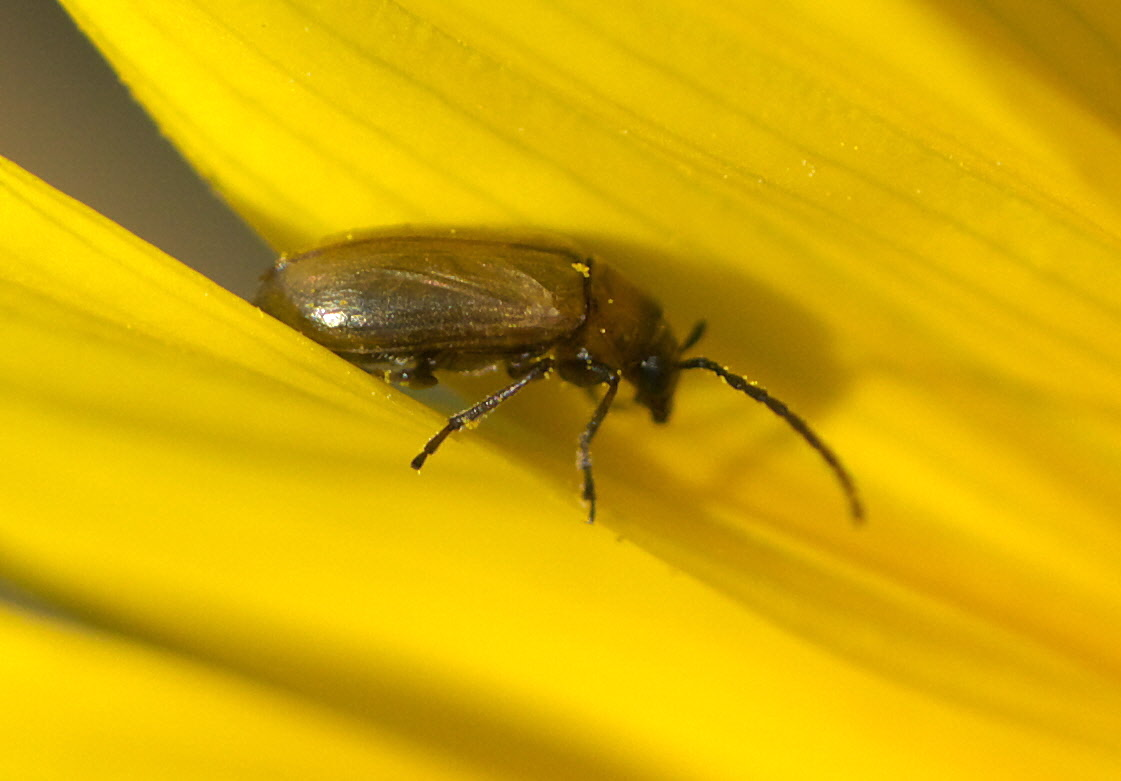
Metrioidea sp., Texas

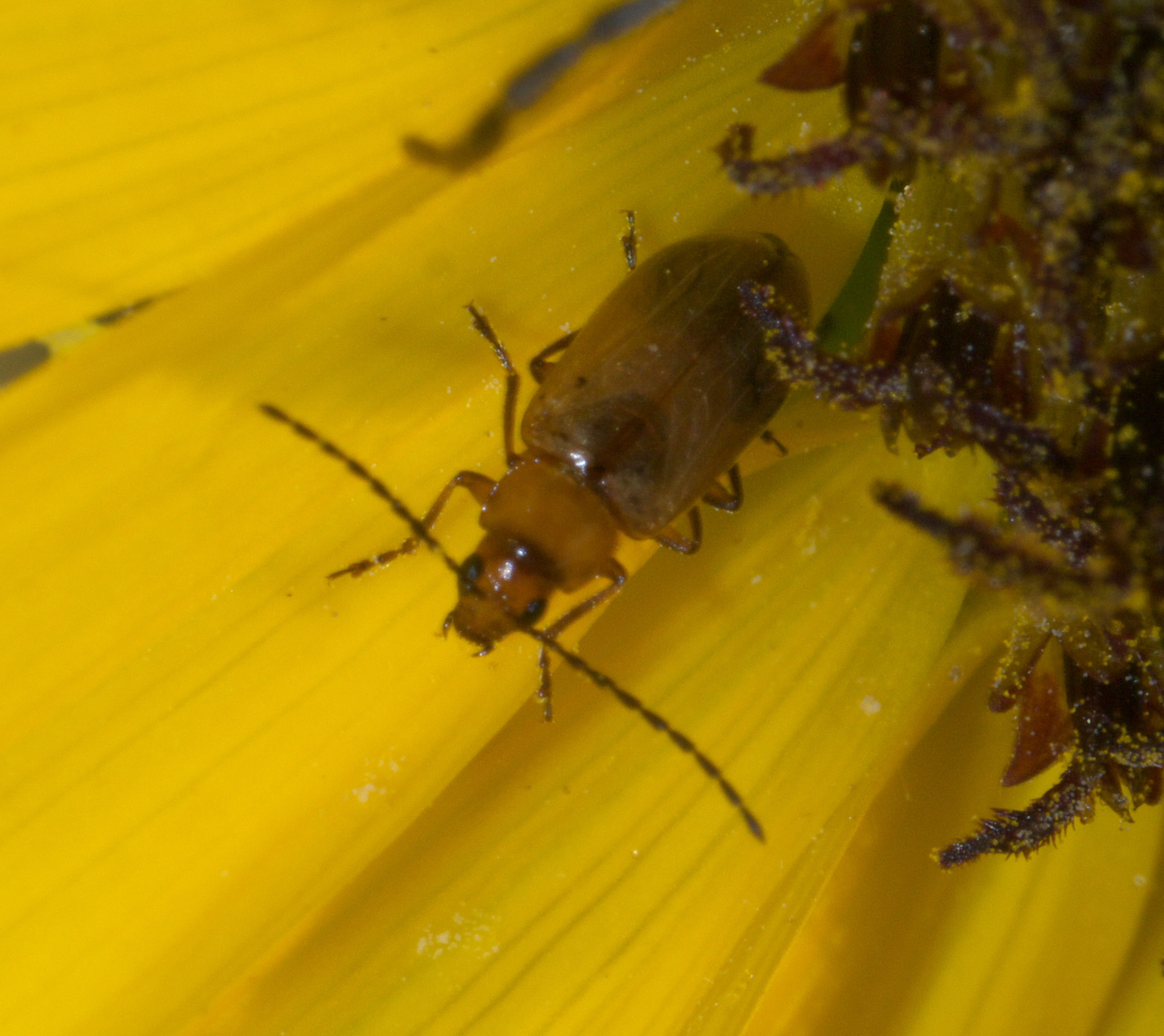
Metrioidea sp., Texas

== Species ==
These species belong to the genus Metrioidea:

Fiji/New Caledonia species:

- Metrioidea astridae Beenen, 2013 – New Caledonia
- Metrioidea aurantiaca Beenen, 2013 – New Caledonia
- Metrioidea bimaculata (Perroud & Montrouzier, 1864) – New Caledonia
- Metrioidea brunneipennis Beenen, 2013 – New Caledonia
- Metrioidea cornuphallus Beenen, 2008 – New Caledonia
- Metrioidea decorata Beenen, 2013 – New Caledonia
- Metrioidea glabella Beenen, 2013 – New Caledonia
- Metrioidea hirtipennis Beenen, 2013 – New Caledonia
- Metrioidea ingeborgae Beenen, 2013 – New Caledonia
- Metrioidea janbezdeki Beenen, 2013 – New Caledonia
- Metrioidea lateralimaculata Beenen, 2008 – New Caledonia
- Metrioidea millei Beenen, 2008 – New Caledonia
- Metrioidea moala (Gressitt in Bryant & Gressitt, 1957) – Fiji
- Metrioidea monteithi Beenen, 2013 – New Caledonia
- Metrioidea petrae Beenen, 2008 – New Caledonia
- Metrioidea pilifera Beenen, 2013 – New Caledonia
- Metrioidea schoelleri Beenen, 2008 – New Caledonia
- Metrioidea wanati Beenen, 2008 – New Caledonia
- Metrioidea vitiensis (Bryant, 1925) – Fiji
- Metrioidea signatipennis Fairmaire, 1881 – Fiji
- Metrioidea undulata Beenen, 2013 – New Caledonia
- Metrioidea zimmermani (Bryant in Bryant & Gressitt, 1957) – Fiji

New World species:

- Metrioidea atriceps (Horn, 1893)
- Metrioidea blakeae (Wilcox, 1965)
- Metrioidea brunnea (Crotch, 1873) (corn silk beetle)
- Metrioidea chiricahuensis (Blake, 1942)
- Metrioidea convexa (Blake, 1942)
- Metrioidea elachista (Blake, 1942)
- Metrioidea morula (J.L.LeConte, 1865)
- Metrioidea ocularis (Blake, 1942)
- Metrioidea popenoei (Blake, 1942)
- Metrioidea punctatissima (Blake, 1942)
- Metrioidea varicornis (J. L. LeConte, 1868)
