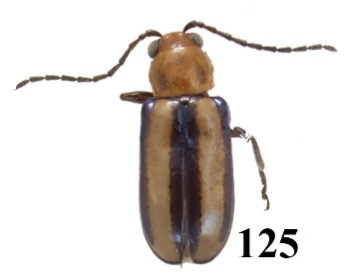

Scientific classification
- Kingdom: Animalia
- Phylum: Arthropoda
- Clade: Pancrustacea
- Class: Insecta
- Order: Coleoptera
- Suborder: Polyphaga
- Infraorder: Cucujiformia
- Family: Chrysomelidae
- Tribe: Luperini
- Subtribe: Luperina
- Genus: Keitheatus; Wilcox, 1965
- Species: K. blakeae

Binomial name
- Keitheatus blakeae (B. White, 1944)

Synonyms
- Scelolyperus blakeae White, 1944

= Keitheatus =

Genus of beetles

Keitheatus is a genus of skeletonizing leaf beetles in the family Chrysomelidae. There is one described species in Keitheatus, Keitheatus blakeae. They are found in Texas and Mexico.

A second species, Keitheatus histrio from Baja California in Mexico, was originally included in the genus, but was transferred to Pseudoluperus in 2005 and Amplioluperus in 2022.
