= Ochralea =

Scientific classification
- Kingdom: Animalia
- Phylum: Arthropoda
- Clade: Pancrustacea
- Class: Insecta
- Order: Coleoptera
- Suborder: Polyphaga
- Infraorder: Cucujiformia
- Family: Chrysomelidae
- Subfamily: Galerucinae
- Tribe: Luperini
- Genus: Ochralea; Clark, 1865

Type species
- Ochralea nigricornis (= Galeruca nigripes Olivier, 1808) Clark, 1865

Genus of leaf beetles

Ochralea is a genus of leaf beetles in the subfamily Galerucinae. It is distributed in the Oriental realm. The genus was formerly considered a synonym of Monolepta, until it was resurrected by Hazmi and Wagner in 2010, but the name is a permanently unavailable junior homonym of Ochralea Chevrolat, 1836 and will need to be replaced.

== Species ==
The genus includes two species:

- Ochralea nigripes (Olivier, 1808)
- Ochralea wangkliana (Mohamedsaid, 2005)
