= Texiluperus =

Scientific classification
- Kingdom: Animalia
- Phylum: Arthropoda
- Clade: Pancrustacea
- Class: Insecta
- Order: Coleoptera
- Suborder: Polyphaga
- Infraorder: Cucujiformia
- Family: Chrysomelidae
- Tribe: Luperini
- Subtribe: Luperina
- Genus: Texiluperus; Viswajyothi & Clark, 2022

Genus of leaf beetles

Texiluperus is a genus of beetles belonging to the family Chrysomelidae. The genus includes two species, both of which were originally named in Luperodes and later placed in Pseudoluperus.

== Species ==
- Texiluperus spretus (Horn, 1893)
- Texiluperus texanus (Horn, 1893)

== Etymology ==
The name of the genus suggests that the genus occurs in Texas, which is the case for both described species.
