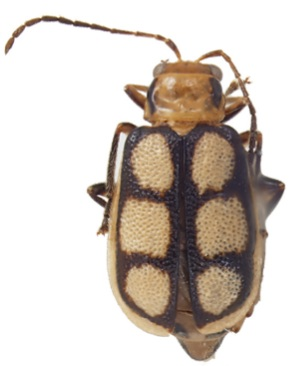

Scientific classification
- Kingdom: Animalia
- Phylum: Arthropoda
- Clade: Pancrustacea
- Class: Insecta
- Order: Coleoptera
- Suborder: Polyphaga
- Infraorder: Cucujiformia
- Family: Chrysomelidae
- Genus: Trichobrotica
- Species: T. sexplagiata

Binomial name
- Trichobrotica sexplagiata (Jacoby, 1878)

Synonyms
- Diabrotica sexplagiata Jacoby, 1878; Diabrotica bivittaticollis Baly, 1886

= Trichobrotica sexplagiata =

Species of beetle

Trichobrotica sexplagiata is a species of beetle of the family Chrysomelidae. It is found in Belize and Mexico.
