= Scelolyperus meracus =

Scientific classification
- Kingdom: Animalia
- Phylum: Arthropoda
- Clade: Pancrustacea
- Class: Insecta
- Order: Coleoptera
- Suborder: Polyphaga
- Infraorder: Cucujiformia
- Family: Chrysomelidae
- Genus: Scelolyperus
- Species: S. meracus

Binomial name
- Scelolyperus meracus (Say, 1826)

Species of beetle

Scelolyperus meracus is a species of skeletonizing leaf beetle in the family Chrysomelidae. It is found in North America.
