= Microscelida subglabrata =

Scientific classification
- Kingdom: Animalia
- Phylum: Arthropoda
- Clade: Pancrustacea
- Class: Insecta
- Order: Coleoptera
- Suborder: Polyphaga
- Infraorder: Cucujiformia
- Family: Chrysomelidae
- Genus: Microscelida
- Species: M. subglabrata

Binomial name
- Microscelida subglabrata (Jacoby, 1888)

Synonyms
- Luperus subglabratus Jacoby, 1888; Pseudoluperus subglabratus

Species of beetle

Microscelida subglabrata is a species of beetle of the family Chrysomelidae. It is found in Mexico (Guerrero).
