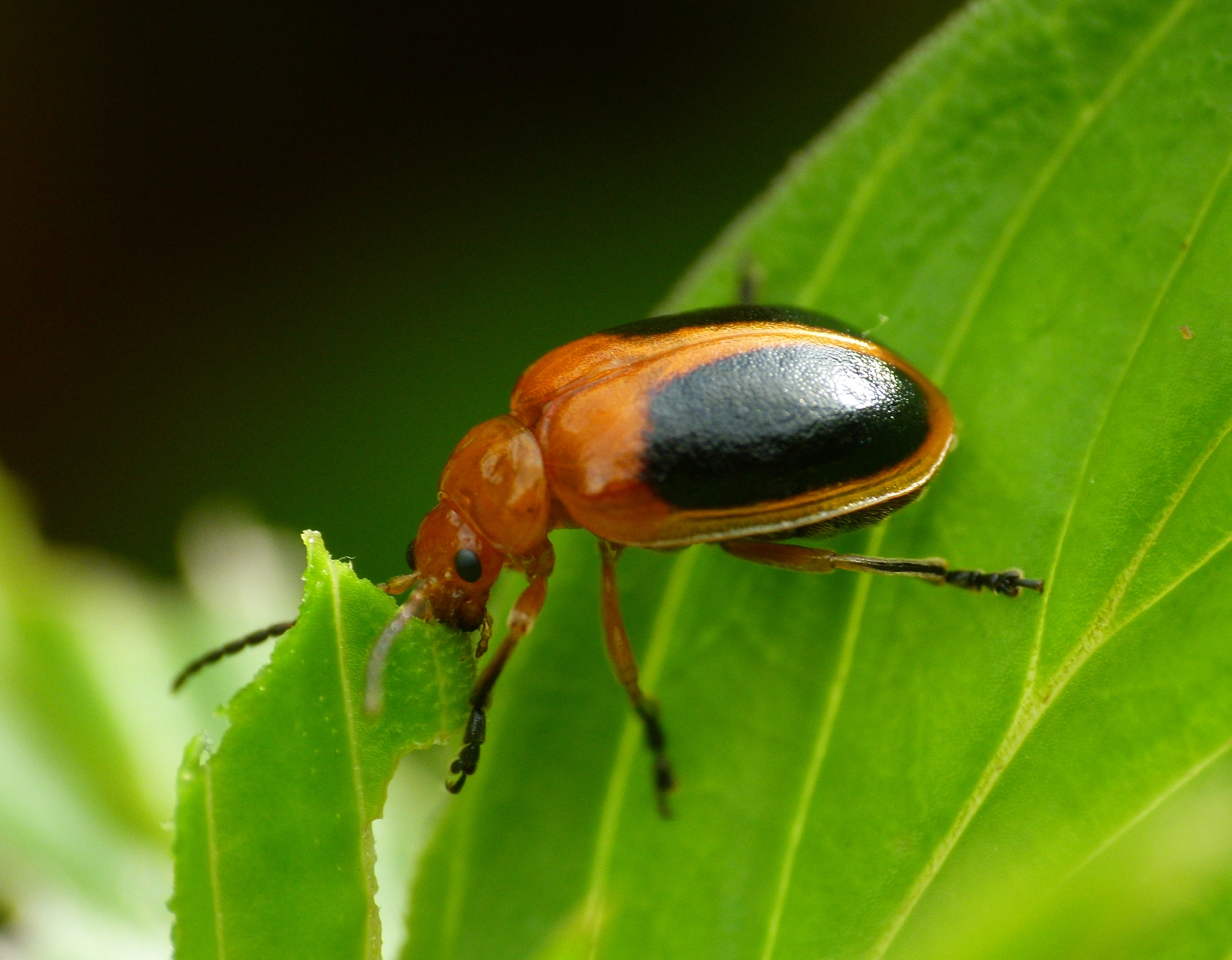
- Oides affinis from Kerala

Scientific classification
- Kingdom: Animalia
- Phylum: Arthropoda
- Class: Insecta
- Order: Coleoptera
- Suborder: Polyphaga
- Infraorder: Cucujiformia
- Family: Chrysomelidae
- Subfamily: Galerucinae
- Tribe: Oidini
- Genus: Oides; Weber, 1801

Type species
- Chrysomela bipunctata (= Adorium palleatum Fabricius, 1801) Fabricius, 1781

Synonyms
- Adorium Fabricius, 1801; Callipepla Dejean, 1836 (nec Wagler, 1832); Ochralea Chevrolat, 1836; Rhombopalpa Chevrolat, 1836; Eparchista Gistel, 1848; Boisduvalia Montrouzier, 1856; Botanoctona Fairmaire, 1877

= Oides =

Genus of beetles

Oides is a genus of leaf beetle with nearly 40 species in the Oriental and Palearctic Realms.

Species in the genus include:

- Oides affinis Jacoby, 1883
- Oides andrewesi Jacoby, 1900
- Oides antennata Duvivier, 1884
- Oides apicalis Jacoby, 1883
- Oides bezdeki Lee & Beenen, 2017
- Oides boreri Lee & Beenen, 2017
- Oides bowringii (Baly, 1863)
- Oides celebensis Duvivier, 1884
- Oides coccinelloides Gahan, 1891
- Oides cyanella Jacoby, 1886
- Oides decempunctata (Billberg, 1808)
- Oides dimidiaticornis Jacoby, 1894
- Oides duodecimpunctata (Clark, 1865)
- Oides duporti Laboissière, 1919
- Oides epipleuralis Laboissière, 1929
- Oides femoralis Laboissière, 1940
- Oides flava (Olivier, 1807)
- Oides foveicollis Laboissière, 1940
- Oides geiseri Lee & Beenen, 2017
- Oides hsui Lee & Beenen, 2017
- Oides innocua Gahan, 1891
- Oides laticlava (Fairmaire, 1889)
- Oides leucomelaena Weise, 1922
- Oides livida (Fabricius, 1801)
- Oides maculata (Olivier, 1807)
- Oides maculosa Gahan, 1891
- Oides metallica Jacoby, 1884
- Oides multimaculata Pic, 1928
- Oides palleata (Fabricius, 1801)
- Oides quadriguttata Duvivier, 1884
- Oides quadrivittata Gahan, 1891
- Oides scutellata (Hope, 1831)
- Oides semipunctata Duvivier, 1884
- Oides takizawai Lee & Beenen, 2017
- Oides tarsata (Baly, 1865)
- Oides thibettana Jacoby, 1900
- Oides tibiella Wilcox, 1971
- Oides ustulaticia Laboissière, 1927
- Oides vexilla Duvivier, 1884
- Oides wangi Lee & Beenen, 2017
