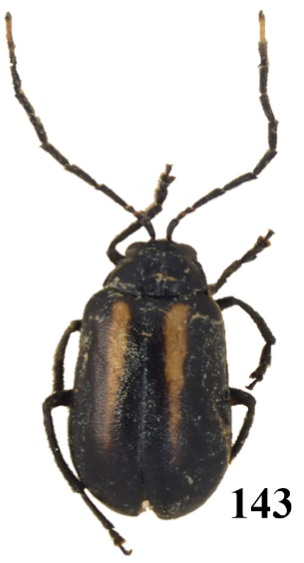

Scientific classification
- Kingdom: Animalia
- Phylum: Arthropoda
- Clade: Pancrustacea
- Class: Insecta
- Order: Coleoptera
- Suborder: Polyphaga
- Infraorder: Cucujiformia
- Family: Chrysomelidae
- Genus: Lilophaea
- Species: L. brasiliensis

Binomial name
- Lilophaea brasiliensis (Jacoby, 1888)

Synonyms
- Luperodes brasiliensis Jacoby, 1888

= Lilophaea brasiliensis =

Species of beetle

Lilophaea brasiliensis is a species of beetle of the family Chrysomelidae. It is found in Brazil.
