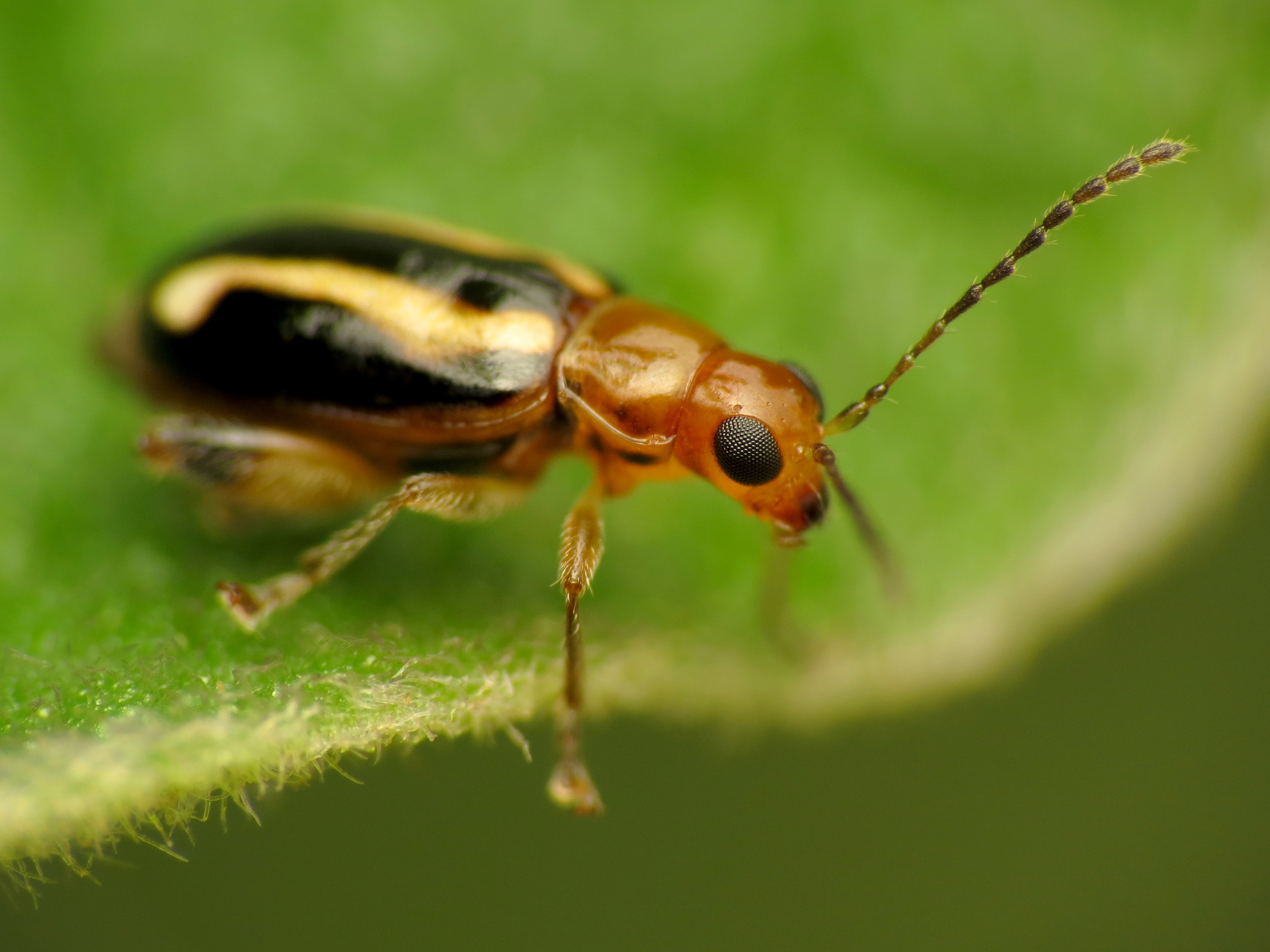
- Observed in Alajuela Province, Costa Rica

Scientific classification
- Kingdom: Animalia
- Phylum: Arthropoda
- Clade: Pancrustacea
- Class: Insecta
- Order: Coleoptera
- Suborder: Polyphaga
- Infraorder: Cucujiformia
- Family: Chrysomelidae
- Tribe: Luperini
- Subtribe: Luperina
- Genus: Synetocephalus
- Species: S. bivittatus

Binomial name
- Synetocephalus bivittatus (J. L. LeConte, 1859)

= Synetocephalus bivittatus =

Species of beetle

Synetocephalus bivittatus is a species of skeletonizing leaf beetle in the family Chrysomelidae. It is found in North America.
