= Mexiluperus wickhami =

Scientific classification
- Kingdom: Animalia
- Phylum: Arthropoda
- Clade: Pancrustacea
- Class: Insecta
- Order: Coleoptera
- Suborder: Polyphaga
- Infraorder: Cucujiformia
- Family: Chrysomelidae
- Genus: Mexiluperus
- Species: M. wickhami

Binomial name
- Mexiluperus wickhami (Horn, 1893)

Synonyms
- Luperodes wickhami Horn, 1893; Pseudoluperus wickhami

Species of beetle

Mexiluperus wickhami is a species of beetle of the family Chrysomelidae. It is found in North America, where it has been recorded from Arizona.

== Description ==
Adults reach a length of about 3.5–4 mm.
