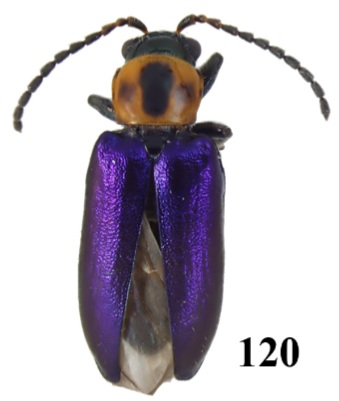

Scientific classification
- Kingdom: Animalia
- Phylum: Arthropoda
- Clade: Pancrustacea
- Class: Insecta
- Order: Coleoptera
- Suborder: Polyphaga
- Infraorder: Cucujiformia
- Family: Chrysomelidae
- Genus: Amplioluperus
- Species: A. maculicollis

Binomial name
- Amplioluperus maculicollis (J. L. LeConte, 1884)

Synonyms
- Luperus maculicollis LeConte, 1884; Pseudoluperus maculicollis

= Amplioluperus maculicollis =

Species of beetle

Amplioluperus maculicollis is a species of leaf beetles in the family Chrysomelidae. It is found in Central America and North America.
