= Amplioluperus cyanellus =

Scientific classification
- Kingdom: Animalia
- Phylum: Arthropoda
- Clade: Pancrustacea
- Class: Insecta
- Order: Coleoptera
- Suborder: Polyphaga
- Infraorder: Cucujiformia
- Family: Chrysomelidae
- Tribe: Luperini
- Subtribe: Luperina
- Genus: Amplioluperus
- Species: A. cyanellus

Binomial name
- Amplioluperus cyanellus (Horn, 1895)

Synonyms
- Scelolyperus cyanellus Horn, 1895; Pseudoluperus cyanellus

Species of beetle

Amplioluperus cyanellus is a species of skeletonizing leaf beetle in the family Chrysomelidae. It is found in Central America and North America.
