= Metrioidea atriceps =

Scientific classification
- Kingdom: Animalia
- Phylum: Arthropoda
- Clade: Pancrustacea
- Class: Insecta
- Order: Coleoptera
- Suborder: Polyphaga
- Infraorder: Cucujiformia
- Family: Chrysomelidae
- Tribe: Luperini
- Subtribe: Luperina
- Genus: Metrioidea
- Species: M. atriceps

Binomial name
- Metrioidea atriceps (Horn, 1893)

Species of beetle

Metrioidea atriceps is a species of skeletonizing leaf beetle in the family Chrysomelidae. It is found in North America.
