= Metrioidea brunnea =

Scientific classification
- Kingdom: Animalia
- Phylum: Arthropoda
- Clade: Pancrustacea
- Class: Insecta
- Order: Coleoptera
- Suborder: Polyphaga
- Infraorder: Cucujiformia
- Family: Chrysomelidae
- Tribe: Luperini
- Subtribe: Luperina
- Genus: Metrioidea
- Species: M. brunnea

Binomial name
- Metrioidea brunnea (Crotch, 1873)

Species of insect

Metrioidea brunnea, the corn silk beetle, is a species of skeletonizing leaf beetle in the family Chrysomelidae. It is found in North America.
