= Microscelida subcostata =

Scientific classification
- Kingdom: Animalia
- Phylum: Arthropoda
- Clade: Pancrustacea
- Class: Insecta
- Order: Coleoptera
- Suborder: Polyphaga
- Infraorder: Cucujiformia
- Family: Chrysomelidae
- Genus: Microscelida
- Species: M. subcostata

Binomial name
- Microscelida subcostata (Jacoby, 1888)

Synonyms
- Luperus subcostatus Jacoby, 1888; Pseudoluperus subcostatus

Species of beetle

Microscelida subcostata is a species of beetle of the family Chrysomelidae. It is found in Mexico (Chiapas, Guerrero, Michoacán, Veracruz).
