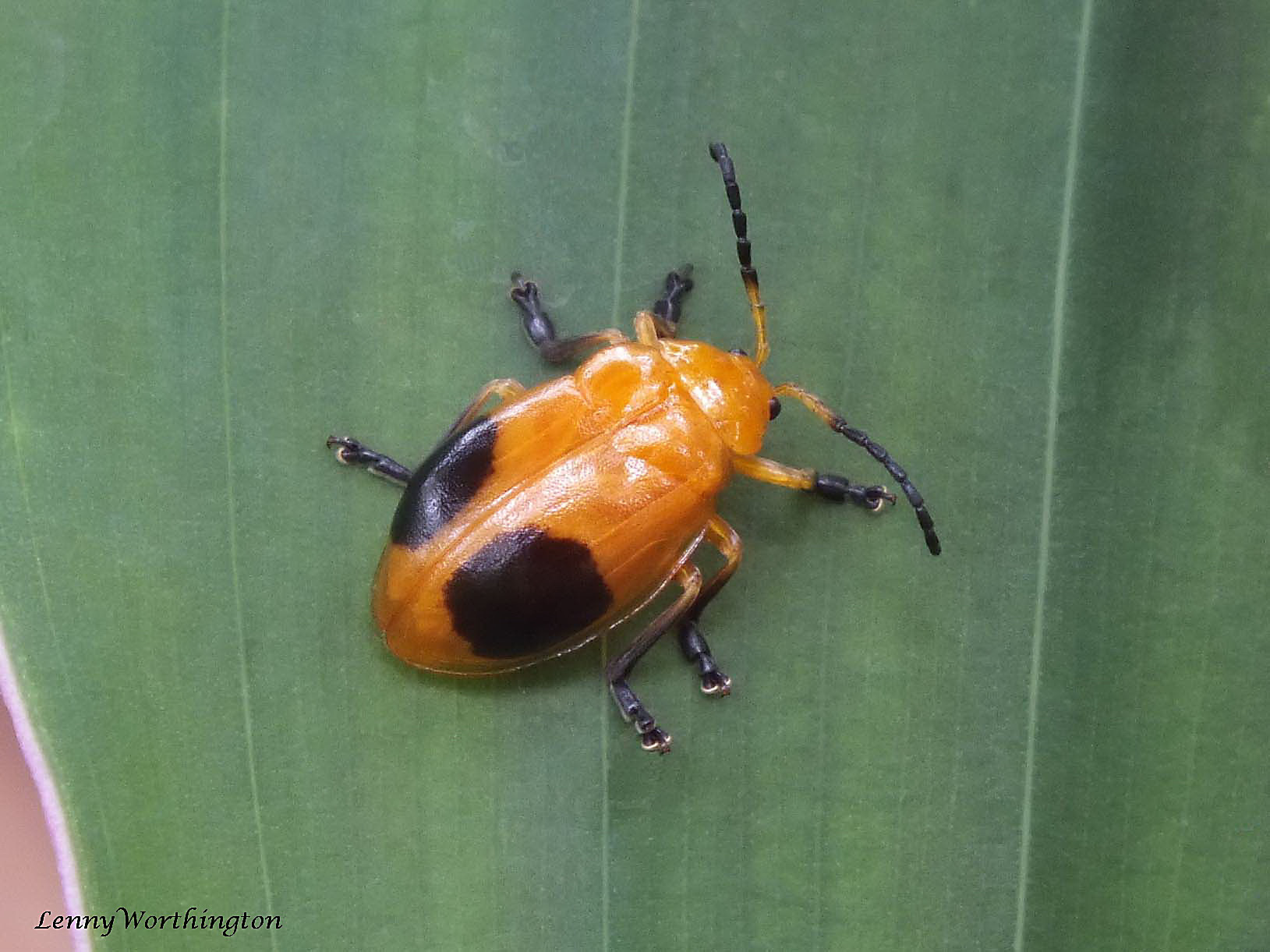
- Oides andrewesi

Scientific classification
- Kingdom: Animalia
- Phylum: Arthropoda
- Class: Insecta
- Order: Coleoptera
- Suborder: Polyphaga
- Infraorder: Cucujiformia
- Family: Chrysomelidae
- Subfamily: Galerucinae
- Tribe: Oidini; Laboissière, 1921

Type genus
- Oides Weber, 1801

= Oidini =

Tribe of leaf beetles

Oidini is a tribe of leaf beetles in the subfamily Galerucinae found in tropical and subtropical regions of Africa, Asia, and Australasia.

== Genera ==
The tribe includes the following 7 genera:

- Anoides Weise, 1912 - Australasia
- Drasa Bryant, 1941 - Solomon Islands
- Ellopidia Hincks, 1949 - Australasia
- Impensa Wilcox, 1971 - ???
- Oides Weber, 1801 (type genus) - Africa, Asia and Australasia
- Oidomorpha Laboissière, 1924 - Kenya
- Paranoides Vachon, 1976 - ???
