= Metrioidea convexa =

Scientific classification
- Kingdom: Animalia
- Phylum: Arthropoda
- Clade: Pancrustacea
- Class: Insecta
- Order: Coleoptera
- Suborder: Polyphaga
- Infraorder: Cucujiformia
- Family: Chrysomelidae
- Tribe: Luperini
- Subtribe: Luperina
- Genus: Metrioidea
- Species: M. convexa

Binomial name
- Metrioidea convexa (Blake, 1942)

Species of beetle

Metrioidea convexa is a species of leaf beetle in the family Chrysomelidae. It is found in North America.
