= Scelolyperus smaragdinus =

Scientific classification
- Kingdom: Animalia
- Phylum: Arthropoda
- Clade: Pancrustacea
- Class: Insecta
- Order: Coleoptera
- Suborder: Polyphaga
- Infraorder: Cucujiformia
- Family: Chrysomelidae
- Tribe: Luperini
- Subtribe: Luperina
- Genus: Scelolyperus
- Species: S. smaragdinus

Binomial name
- Scelolyperus smaragdinus (J. L. LeConte, 1859)

Species of beetle

Scelolyperus smaragdinus is a species of skeletonizing leaf beetle in the family Chrysomelidae. It is found in North America.
