= Synetocephalus autumnalis =

Scientific classification
- Kingdom: Animalia
- Phylum: Arthropoda
- Clade: Pancrustacea
- Class: Insecta
- Order: Coleoptera
- Suborder: Polyphaga
- Infraorder: Cucujiformia
- Family: Chrysomelidae
- Genus: Synetocephalus
- Species: S. autumnalis

Binomial name
- Synetocephalus autumnalis Fall, 1910

Species of leaf beetle

Synetocephalus autumnalis is a species of skeletonizing leaf beetle in the family Chrysomelidae. It is found in North America.
