= Mexiluperus dissimilis =

Scientific classification
- Kingdom: Animalia
- Phylum: Arthropoda
- Clade: Pancrustacea
- Class: Insecta
- Order: Coleoptera
- Suborder: Polyphaga
- Infraorder: Cucujiformia
- Family: Chrysomelidae
- Genus: Mexiluperus
- Species: M. dissimilis

Binomial name
- Mexiluperus dissimilis (Jacoby, 1888)

Synonyms
- Luperus dissimilis Jacoby, 1888; Pseudoluperus dissimilis

Species of beetle

Mexiluperus dissimilis is a species of beetle of the family Chrysomelidae. It is found in Mexico (Mexico City, Chihuahua, Guanajuato, Michoacán, Veracruz).
