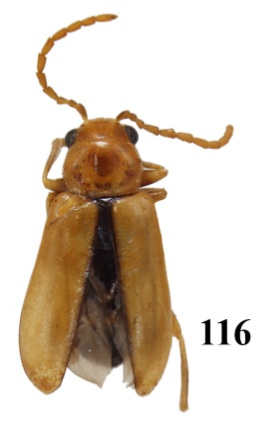

Scientific classification
- Kingdom: Animalia
- Phylum: Arthropoda
- Clade: Pancrustacea
- Class: Insecta
- Order: Coleoptera
- Suborder: Polyphaga
- Infraorder: Cucujiformia
- Family: Chrysomelidae
- Genus: Synetocephalus
- Species: S. penrosei

Binomial name
- Synetocephalus penrosei Gilbert & Clark, 2012

= Synetocephalus penrosei =

Species of beetle

Synetocephalus penrosei is a species of beetle of the family Chrysomelidae. It is found in California.
