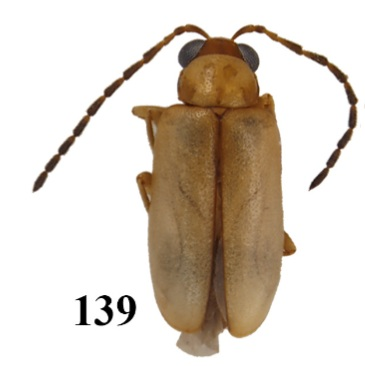

Scientific classification
- Kingdom: Animalia
- Phylum: Arthropoda
- Clade: Pancrustacea
- Class: Insecta
- Order: Coleoptera
- Suborder: Polyphaga
- Infraorder: Cucujiformia
- Family: Chrysomelidae
- Genus: Metrioidea
- Species: M. ocularis

Binomial name
- Metrioidea ocularis (Blake, 1942)

= Metrioidea ocularis =

Species of beetle

Metrioidea ocularis is a species of beetle of the family Chrysomelidae. It is found in Mexico (Sonora).
