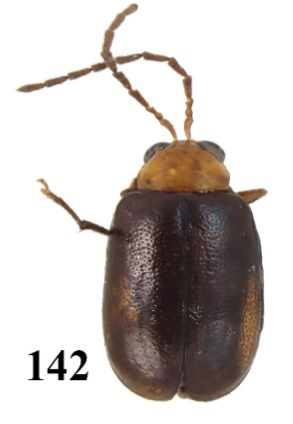

Scientific classification
- Kingdom: Animalia
- Phylum: Arthropoda
- Clade: Pancrustacea
- Class: Insecta
- Order: Coleoptera
- Suborder: Polyphaga
- Infraorder: Cucujiformia
- Family: Chrysomelidae
- Genus: Monolepta
- Species: M. violacea

Binomial name
- Monolepta violacea Jacoby, 1888

= Monolepta violacea =

Species of beetle

Monolepta violacea is a species of beetle of the family Chrysomelidae. It is found in Mexico (Durango).
