= Trichobrotica albomarginata =

Scientific classification
- Kingdom: Animalia
- Phylum: Arthropoda
- Clade: Pancrustacea
- Class: Insecta
- Order: Coleoptera
- Suborder: Polyphaga
- Infraorder: Cucujiformia
- Family: Chrysomelidae
- Genus: Trichobrotica
- Species: T. albomarginata

Binomial name
- Trichobrotica albomarginata (Jacoby, 1888)

Synonyms
- Luperus albomarginatus Jacoby, 1888; Pseudoluperus albomarginatus

Species of beetle

Trichobrotica albomarginata is a species of beetle of the family Chrysomelidae. It is found in Guatemala.
