= Metrioidea varicornis =

Scientific classification
- Kingdom: Animalia
- Phylum: Arthropoda
- Clade: Pancrustacea
- Class: Insecta
- Order: Coleoptera
- Suborder: Polyphaga
- Infraorder: Cucujiformia
- Family: Chrysomelidae
- Tribe: Luperini
- Subtribe: Luperina
- Genus: Metrioidea
- Species: M. varicornis

Binomial name
- Metrioidea varicornis (J. L. LeConte, 1868)

Species of beetle

Metrioidea varicornis is a species of skeletonizing leaf beetle in the family Chrysomelidae. It is found in Central America and North America.
