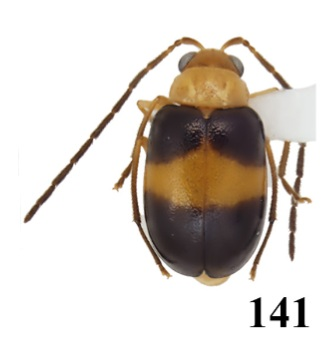

Scientific classification
- Kingdom: Animalia
- Phylum: Arthropoda
- Clade: Pancrustacea
- Class: Insecta
- Order: Coleoptera
- Suborder: Polyphaga
- Infraorder: Cucujiformia
- Family: Chrysomelidae
- Genus: Luperodes
- Species: L. nigricornis

Binomial name
- Luperodes nigricornis Jacoby, 1888

= Luperodes nigricornis =

Species of beetle

Luperodes nigricornis is a species of beetle of the family Chrysomelidae. It is found in Mexico.
