= Microscelida violacea =

Scientific classification
- Kingdom: Animalia
- Phylum: Arthropoda
- Clade: Pancrustacea
- Class: Insecta
- Order: Coleoptera
- Suborder: Polyphaga
- Infraorder: Cucujiformia
- Family: Chrysomelidae
- Genus: Microscelida
- Species: M. violacea

Binomial name
- Microscelida violacea (Jacoby, 1892)

Synonyms
- Scelidopsis violacea Jacoby, 1892

Species of beetle

Microscelida violacea is a species of beetle of the family Chrysomelidae. It is found in Mexico (Guerrero).
