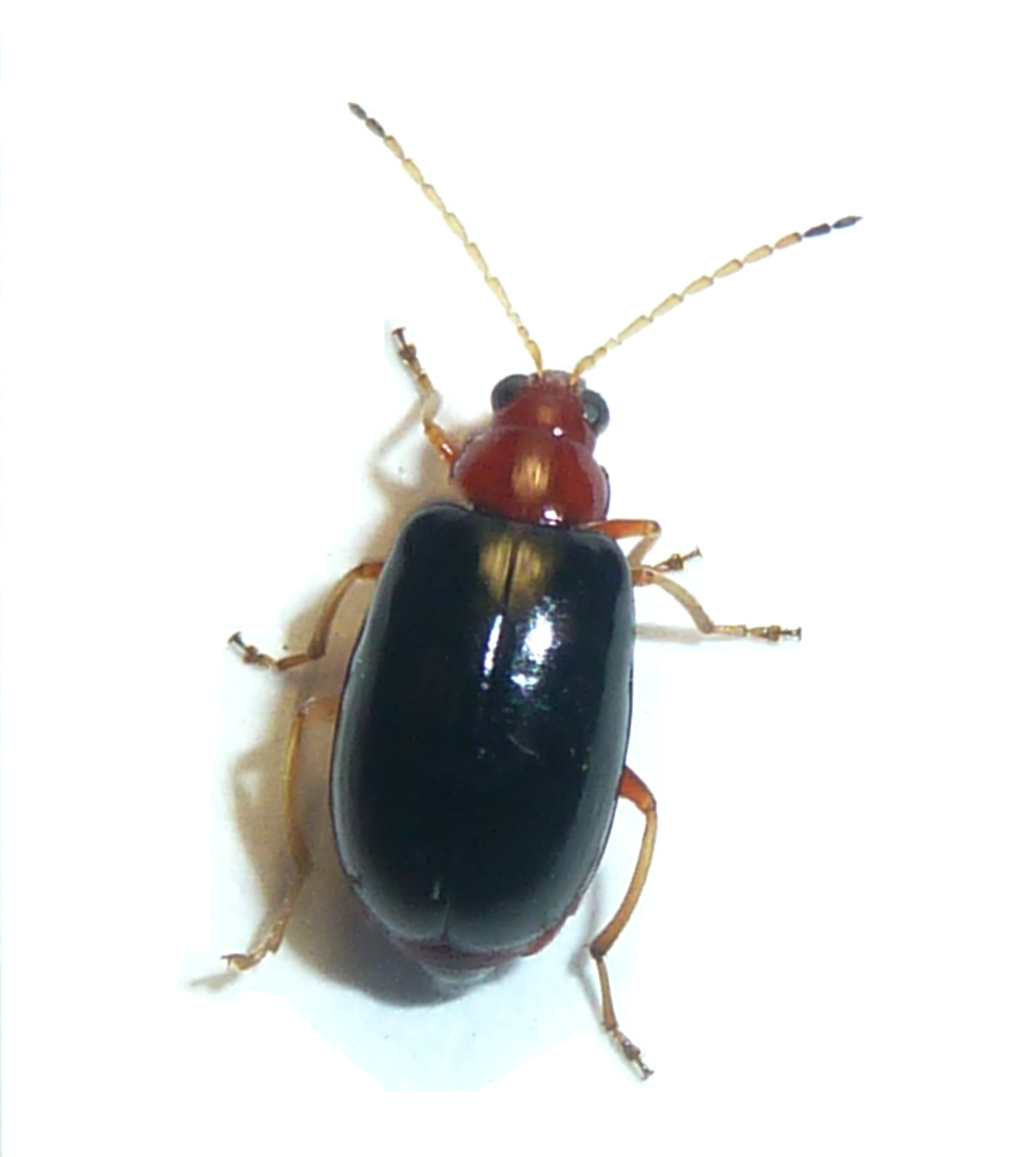
- Monolepta marginella, South Africa

Scientific classification
- Kingdom: Animalia
- Phylum: Arthropoda
- Clade: Pancrustacea
- Class: Insecta
- Order: Coleoptera
- Suborder: Polyphaga
- Infraorder: Cucujiformia
- Family: Chrysomelidae
- Subfamily: Galerucinae
- Tribe: Luperini
- Genus: Monolepta; Chevrolat in Dejean, 1836.

Type species
- Crioceris bioculata Fabricius, 1781

Synonyms
- Cnecodes Motschulsky, 1858; Mesolepta Kirby, 1880; Damais Jacoby, 1903; Chimporia Laboissière, 1931; Aemulaphthona Scherer, 1969

= Monolepta =

Genus of beetles

Monolepta is a genus of skeletonizing leaf beetles in the family Chrysomelidae. It is the most diverse and widely distributed genus in the Galerucinae sensu stricto, with more than 700 described species occurring almost worldwide. It is missing from the Nearctic realm.

The genus was first established by Louis Alexandre Auguste Chevrolat in 1836 to include species of Galerucinae with an elongated basi-metatarsus (the first tarsomere of the hind leg). The generic name Monolepta is derived from the Greek μόνος (monos, meaning 'one') and λεπτός (leptos, meaning 'thin, slender'). In 1875, Félicien Chapuis established the supra-generic group "Monoleptites", which included other Galerucinae with an elongated basi-metatarsus. Other genera traditionally placed in this group include, for example, Luperodes, Candezea and Barombiella. The group "Monoleptites" was later found to be polyphyletic, as an elongated basi-metatarsus has evolved multiple times in the Galerucinae.

== Selected species ==
- Monolepta albipunctata Lei, Xu, Yang & Nie, 2021
- Monolepta alticola Lei, Xu, Yang & Nie, 2021
- Monolepta annamita Laboissiere, 1889
- Monolepta australis Jacoby, 1882
- Monolepta bioculata (Fabricius, 1781)
- Monolepta bivittata Lei, Xu, Yang & Nie, 2021
- Monolepta cavipennis Baly, 1878
- Monolepta cruciata Guérin de Méneville, 1847
- Monolepta hagiangana Bezděk & Beenen, 2020
- Monolepta kuroheri Kimoto, 1966
- Monolepta leechi Jacoby, 1890
- Monolepta leuce Weise, 1903
- Monolepta marginella Weise, 1903
- Monolepta melanogaster (Wiedemann, 1823)
- Monolepta mengsongensis Lei, Xu, Yang & Nie, 2021
- Monolepta pallidula (Baly, 1874)
- Monolepta quadriguttata (Motschulsky, 1860)
- Monolepta rubripennis Lei, Xu, Yang & Nie, 2021
- Monolepta rufofulva Chujo, 1938
- Monolepta sauteri Chujo, 1935
- Monolepta signata (Olivier, 1808)
- Monolepta violacea Jacoby, 1888
