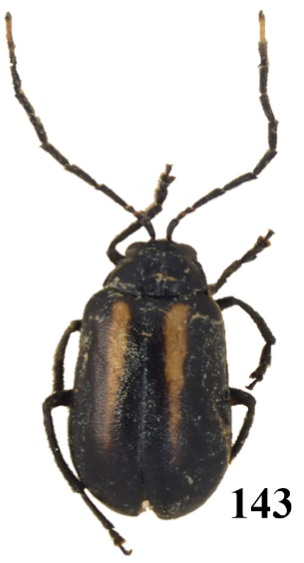
- Lilophaea brasiliensis

Scientific classification
- Kingdom: Animalia
- Phylum: Arthropoda
- Clade: Pancrustacea
- Class: Insecta
- Order: Coleoptera
- Suborder: Polyphaga
- Infraorder: Cucujiformia
- Family: Chrysomelidae
- Tribe: Luperini
- Subtribe: Luperina
- Genus: Lilophaea; Bechyné, 1958

= Lilophaea =

Genus of leaf beetles

Lilophaea is a genus of beetles belonging to the family Chrysomelidae.

== Species ==
- Lilophaea auspicialis Bechyne, 1997
- Lilophaea areia
- Lilophaea benevidensis
- Lilophaea blumenensis
- Lilophaea brasiliensis (Jacoby, 1888)
- Lilophaea cartayai Bechyne, 1997
- Lilophaea diomedes
- Lilophaea elongatella
- Lilophaea emerita
- Lilophaea immersa
- Lilophaea piceola
- Lilophaea rigorosa
- Lilophaea roborensis
- Lilophaea rozei
- Lilophaea semimarginata
- Lilophaea sulina
- Lilophaea sponsoria
- Lilophaea taimbezinhensis
- Lilophaea uroderina
