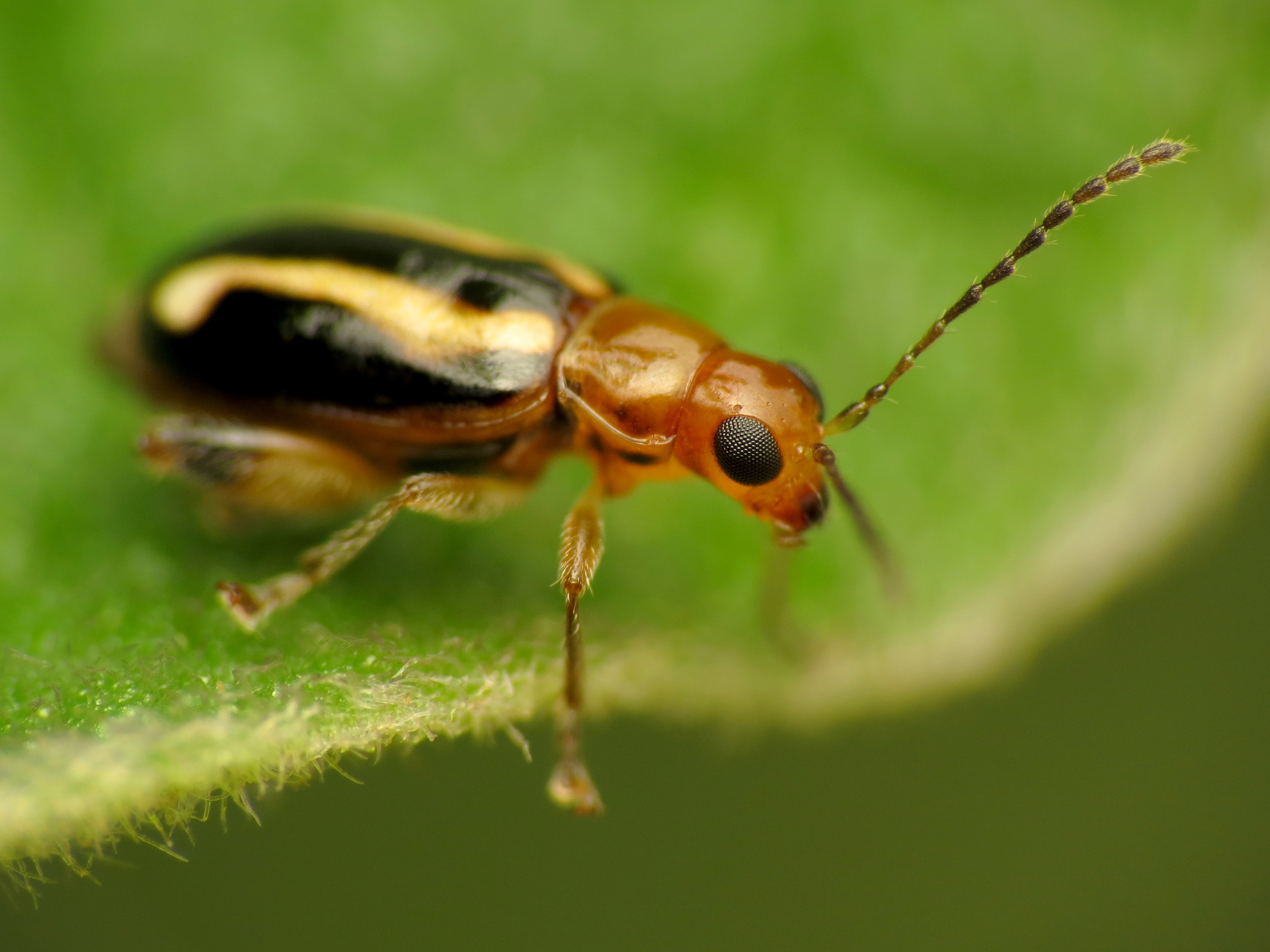
- Synetocephalus bivittatus

Scientific classification
- Kingdom: Animalia
- Phylum: Arthropoda
- Clade: Pancrustacea
- Class: Insecta
- Order: Coleoptera
- Suborder: Polyphaga
- Infraorder: Cucujiformia
- Family: Chrysomelidae
- Subfamily: Galerucinae
- Tribe: Luperini
- Subtribe: Luperina
- Genus: Synetocephalus; Fall, 1910

= Synetocephalus =

Genus of beetles

Synetocephalus is a genus of skeletonizing leaf beetles in the family Chrysomelidae. There are about 10 described species in Synetocephalus. They are found in North America.

== Species ==
These 10 species belong to the genus Synetocephalus:

- Synetocephalus adenostomatus (B. White, 1942)
- Synetocephalus atricornis (Fall, 1910)
- Synetocephalus autumnalis Fall, 1910
- Synetocephalus bivittatus (J. L. LeConte, 1859)
- Synetocephalus crassicornis (Fall, 1910)
- Synetocephalus curvatus (Fall, 1910)
- Synetocephalus diegensis (Blake, 1942)
- Synetocephalus monorhabdus (Blake, 1942)
- Synetocephalus penrosei Gilbert & Clark, 2012
- Synetocephalus vandykei (Blake, 1942)
- Synetocephalus wallacei (Wilcox, 1965)
