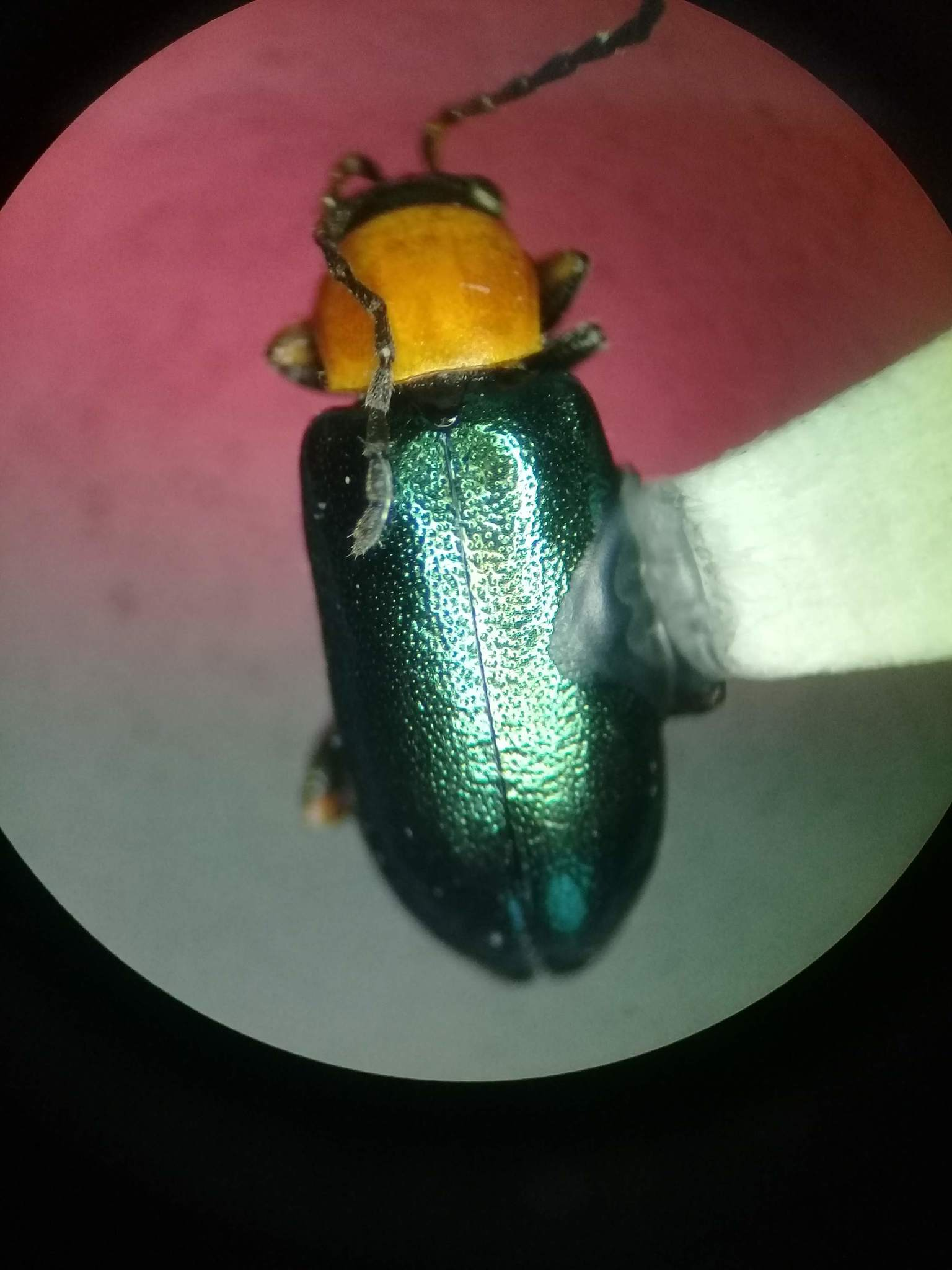
- Scelolyperus torquatus

Scientific classification
- Kingdom: Animalia
- Phylum: Arthropoda
- Clade: Pancrustacea
- Class: Insecta
- Order: Coleoptera
- Suborder: Polyphaga
- Infraorder: Cucujiformia
- Family: Chrysomelidae
- Subfamily: Galerucinae
- Tribe: Luperini
- Subtribe: Luperina
- Genus: Scelolyperus; Crotch, 1874

Synonyms
- Eugalera Brancsik, 1899; Tuomuria Chen & Jiang in Huang et al., 1985

= Scelolyperus =

Genus of beetles

Scelolyperus is a genus of skeletonizing leaf beetles in the family Chrysomelidae. There are more than 20 described species in Scelolyperus. They are found in North America, Mexico, and the Palaearctic.

== Species ==
These 28 species belong to the genus Scelolyperus:

- Scelolyperus bimarginatus (Blake, 1928)
- Scelolyperus carinatus Wilcox, 1965
- Scelolyperus clarki Gilbert & Andrews
- Scelolyperus curvipes Wilcox, 1965
- Scelolyperus cyanellus (J. L. LeConte, 1865)
- Scelolyperus flavicollis (J. L. LeConte, 1859)
- Scelolyperus graptoderoides (Crotch, 1874)
- Scelolyperus hatchi Wilcox, 1965
- Scelolyperus laticeps (Horn, 1893)
- Scelolyperus lecontii (Crotch, 1873)
- Scelolyperus lemhii Hatch, 1971
- Scelolyperus liriophilus Wilcox, 1965
- Scelolyperus loripes Horn, 1893
- Scelolyperus megalurus Wilcox, 1965
- Scelolyperus meracus (Say, 1826)
- Scelolyperus nigrocyaneus (J. L. LeConte, 1879)
- Scelolyperus pasadenae S. Clark, 1996
- Scelolyperus phenacus Wilcox, 1965
- Scelolyperus phoxus Wilcox, 1965
- Scelolyperus ratulus Wilcox, 1965
- Scelolyperus schwarzii Horn, 1893
- Scelolyperus smaragdinus (J. L. LeConte, 1859)
- Scelolyperus tejonicus Crotch, 1874
- Scelolyperus tetonensis S. Clark, 1996
- Scelolyperus torquatus (J. L. LeConte, 1884)
- Scelolyperus transitus (Horn, 1893)
- Scelolyperus varipes (J. L. LeConte, 1857)
- Scelolyperus wilcoxi Hatch, 1971
