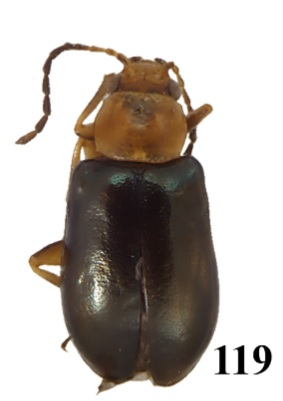

Scientific classification
- Kingdom: Animalia
- Phylum: Arthropoda
- Clade: Pancrustacea
- Class: Insecta
- Order: Coleoptera
- Suborder: Polyphaga
- Infraorder: Cucujiformia
- Family: Chrysomelidae
- Tribe: Luperini
- Subtribe: Luperina
- Genus: Mexiluperus; Viswajyothi & Clark, 2022

= Mexiluperus =

Genus of leaf beetles

Mexiluperus is a genus of beetles belonging to the family Chrysomelidae.

== Species ==
- Mexiluperus dissimilis (Jacoby, 1888)
- Mexiluperus wickhami (Horn, 1893)

== Etymology ==
The name of the genus refers to the geographic distribution, which is principally in Mexico.
