= Amplioluperus histrio =

Scientific classification
- Kingdom: Animalia
- Phylum: Arthropoda
- Clade: Pancrustacea
- Class: Insecta
- Order: Coleoptera
- Suborder: Polyphaga
- Infraorder: Cucujiformia
- Family: Chrysomelidae
- Genus: Amplioluperus
- Species: A. histrio

Binomial name
- Amplioluperus histrio (Horn, 1895)

Synonyms
- Luperodes histrio Horn, 1895; Pseudoluperus histrio

Species of beetle

Amplioluperus histrio is a species of beetle of the family Chrysomelidae. It is found in Baja California.
