= Trichobrotica =

Scientific classification
- Kingdom: Animalia
- Phylum: Arthropoda
- Clade: Pancrustacea
- Class: Insecta
- Order: Coleoptera
- Suborder: Polyphaga
- Infraorder: Cucujiformia
- Family: Chrysomelidae
- Tribe: Luperini
- Subtribe: Diabroticina
- Genus: Trichobrotica; Bechyné, 1956

Synonyms
- Iceloceras Blake, 1958

Genus of leaf beetles

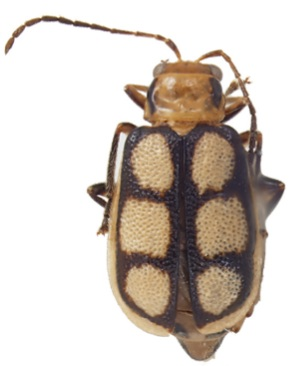
Trichobrotica sexplagiata

Trichobrotica is a genus of beetles belonging to the family Chrysomelidae.

== Species ==
- Trichobrotica albomarginata (Jacoby, 1888)
- Trichobrotica analis (Weise, 1921)
- Trichobrotica biplagiata (Blake, 1958)
- Trichobrotica brasiliensis Bechyne, 1956
- Trichobrotica dorosvittata (Jacoby, 1887)
- Trichobrotica egensis (Blake, 1966)
- Trichobrotica fenestrata Blake, 1966
- Trichobrotica flavipes (Blake, 1958)
- Trichobrotica flavocyanea (Blake, 1958)
- Trichobrotica latiplagiata (Blake, 1958)
- Trichobrotica maxima (Blake, 1958)
- Trichobrotica nigripennis Blake, 1966
- Trichobrotica nigrosignata (Jacoby, 1887)
- Trichobrotica nymphaea (Jacoby, 1887)
- Trichobrotica pallida (Jacoby, 1892)
- Trichobrotica parviplagiata (Blake, 1958)
- Trichobrotica rhabdota Blake, 1966
- Trichobrotica ruatanae (Jacoby, 1892)
- Trichobrotica sexplagiata (Jacoby, 1878)
- Trichobrotica verbesinae (Blake, 1958)
- Trichobrotica vittata (Blake, 1958)
