= Microscelida =

Scientific classification
- Kingdom: Animalia
- Phylum: Arthropoda
- Clade: Pancrustacea
- Class: Insecta
- Order: Coleoptera
- Suborder: Polyphaga
- Infraorder: Cucujiformia
- Family: Chrysomelidae
- Tribe: Luperini
- Subtribe: Luperina
- Genus: Microscelida; Clark, 1998

Genus of leaf beetles

Microscelida is a genus of beetles belonging to the family Chrysomelidae.

== Species ==
- Microscelida alutacea Clark, 1998
- Microscelida foveicollis Clark, 1998
- Microscelida moweri Clark, 1998
- Microscelida subcostata (Jacoby, 1888)
- Microscelida subglabrata (Jacoby, 1888)
- Microscelida violacea (Jacoby, 1892)
- Microscelida viridipennis Clark, 1998
- Microscelida viridis (Jacoby, 1892)
- Microscelida wellsi Clark, 1998
- Microscelida whitingi Clark, 1998
- Microscelida wilcoxi Clark, 1998
