= Amplioluperus =

Scientific classification
- Kingdom: Animalia
- Phylum: Arthropoda
- Clade: Pancrustacea
- Class: Insecta
- Order: Coleoptera
- Suborder: Polyphaga
- Infraorder: Cucujiformia
- Family: Chrysomelidae
- Tribe: Luperini
- Subtribe: Luperina
- Genus: Amplioluperus; Viswajyothi & Clark, 2022

Genus of leaf beetles

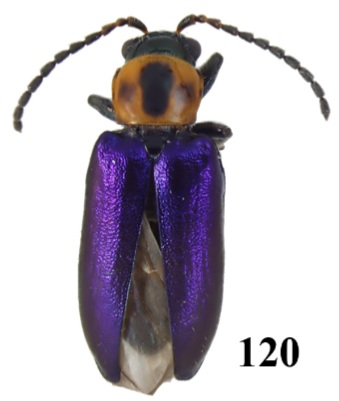
Amplioluperus maculicollis

Amplioluperus is a genus of beetles belonging to the family Chrysomelidae.

== Species ==
- Amplioluperus cyanellus (Horn, 1895)
- Amplioluperus histrio (Horn, 1895)
- Amplioluperus maculicollis (LeConte, 1884)

== Etymology ==
The name Amplioluperus refers to the large size of the type species, in comparison to beetles in related genera.
