= Luperodes =

Scientific classification
- Kingdom: Animalia
- Phylum: Arthropoda
- Clade: Pancrustacea
- Class: Insecta
- Order: Coleoptera
- Suborder: Polyphaga
- Infraorder: Cucujiformia
- Family: Chrysomelidae
- Tribe: Luperini
- Subtribe: Luperina
- Genus: Luperodes; Motschulsky, 1858

Genus of leaf beetles

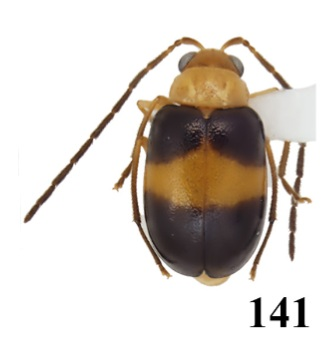
A picture of a Luperodes

Luperodes is a genus of beetles belonging to the family Chrysomelidae.

== Species ==
- Luperodes aethiops (Weise, 1923)
- Luperodes alboplagiatus Motschulsky, 1858
- Luperodes andicola Bechyne, 1956
- Luperodes angustofasciatus Bowditch, 1923
- Luperodes antennalis (Laboissiere, 1931)
- Luperodes apicalis Jacoby, 1888
- Luperodes apicicornis Jacoby, 1888
- Luperodes artificiosus Peyerimhoff
- Luperodes basalis Motschulsky, 1858
- Luperodes biannularis Jacoby, 1888
- Luperodes bilineatus (Weise, 1923)
- Luperodes binotatus Bowditch, 1923
- Luperodes bolivianus Jacoby, 1893
- Luperodes braekeli (Laboissiere, 1932)
- Luperodes callangensis Bechyne, 1956
- Luperodes callopterus Bechyne, 1956
- Luperodes carcacasus Bechyne, 1956
- Luperodes castaneus Jacoby, 1903
- Luperodes cayennensis Bechyne, 1956
- Luperodes cincta (Weise, 1921)
- Luperodes circumcinctus (Laboissiere, 1919)
- Luperodes coerulea (Laboissiere, 1939)
- Luperodes columbicus Weise, 1921
- Luperodes curvicollis Laboissiere, 1922
- Luperodes cyaneoplagiatus Bowditch, 1925
- Luperodes debilis Laboissiere, 1940
- Luperodes deprimozi Laboissiere, 1924
- Luperodes dimidiaticornis Jacoby, 1888
- Luperodes dorsalis Motschulsky, 1866
- Luperodes elongatus Bowditch, 1923
- Luperodes epipleuralis (Weise, 1923)
- Luperodes famelicus Weise, 1910
- Luperodes felix Bechyne, 1956
- Luperodes filicornis Bechyne, 1956
- Luperodes flavipennis Bowditch, 1925
- Luperodes flavonigrum Laboissiere, 1925
- Luperodes freyi Bechyne, 1956
- Luperodes fulvofasciatus Jacoby, 1888
- Luperodes fumescens Bowditch, 1923
- Luperodes geminatus Allard, 1889
- Luperodes granifer Bechyne, 1956
- Luperodes gregalis (Weise, 1923)
- Luperodes humeralis Jacoby, 1883
- Luperodes humilis (Weise, 1923)
- Luperodes impressicollis Jacoby, 1888
- Luperodes inornatus Jacoby, 1889
- Luperodes intramarginalis Kirsch, 1883
- Luperodes jacobyi (Baly, 1886)
- Luperodes julius Bechyne, 1956
- Luperodes klageri Bowditch, 1925
- Luperodes lateralis (Jacoby, 1904)
- Luperodes leucopygus Bechyne, 1956
- Luperodes limbellus Baly, 1886
- Luperodes lineolatus Laboissiere, 1925
- Luperodes mapirii Bowditch, 1925
- Luperodes marcpatensis Bechyne, 1956
- Luperodes masoni Bowditch, 1923
- Luperodes melabonus Bechyne, 1956
- Luperodes melanocephalus Jacoby, 1888
- Luperodes metallicus Jacoby, 1888
- Luperodes mimeograptus Bechyne, 1956
- Luperodes minutus Jacoby, 1888
- Luperodes nigricornis Jacoby, 1888
- Luperodes nigrifrons Allard, 1889
- Luperodes nigrocinctus Motschulsky, 1858
- Luperodes notatus Bowditch, 1923
- Luperodes obscuricornis Weise, 1909
- Luperodes obscurus Bowditch, 1923
- Luperodes ocellata (Laboissiere, 1939)
- Luperodes pallidipennis Bowditch, 1923
- Luperodes pallipes Bowditch, 1923
- Luperodes palmarensis Bechyne, 1956
- Luperodes parilis (Weise, 1923)
- Luperodes pereirai Bechyne, 1956
- Luperodes peryensis Laboissiere, 1931
- Luperodes philippinensis Laboissiere, 1938
- Luperodes pilosus Bowditch, 1925
- Luperodes procerulus (Weise, 1923)
- Luperodes pustulatus Bowditch, 1923
- Luperodes rosenbergi Bowditch, 1923
- Luperodes rozei Bechyne, 1956
- Luperodes rufescens Weise, 1910
- Luperodes sallaei Jacoby, 1888
- Luperodes salvini Jacoby, 1892
- Luperodes scutellaris Weise, 1910
- Luperodes scutobliquus Laboissiere, 1924
- Luperodes submonilis (Wickham, 1914)
- Luperodes subrugosus Jacoby, 1892
- Luperodes sulfuripennis Jacoby, 1899
- Luperodes sumatranus (Weise, 1924)
- Luperodes surrubrensis Bechyne, 1956
- Luperodes tantalus (Weise, 1923)
- Luperodes tibialis (Laboissiere, 1939)
- Luperodes tibiellus Weise, 1921
- Luperodes variabilis (Jacoby, 1894)
- Luperodes variegata (Laboissiere, 1939)
- Luperodes wittmeri Bechyne, 1956
