= Museen am Meer =

Museen am Meer (Museums on the Sea; styled museen am meer) is an association of eight museums in the city centre of Kiel, Schleswig-Holstein, Germany, on the edge of Kiel Fjord. The consortium was founded in 2010.

== The project ==
The responsible bodies of the eight museums in the project are the Christian-Albrechts-Universität zu Kiel (Kiel University), the GEOMAR | Helmholtz Centre for Ocean Research Kiel and the Landeshauptstadt Kiel (capital city kiel).

== The museums ==
=== Collection of Classical Antiquities ===
Antikensammlung Kiel has a collection of Greek vases as well as casts of important Roman and Greek sculptures unique to Schleswig-Holstein.

=== Aquarium GEOMAR ===
Operated by the GEOMAR Helmholtz Centre for Ocean Research Kiel, the aquarium presents from Baltic Sea herring to tropical seahorse: local and exotic sea creatures in aquariums that simulate their natural habitats, outdoor seal pool and public feeding of the seals.

=== Museum of Fine Arts ===
Kunsthalle Kiel presents art from the Dürer era through to the present day: permanent collection spanning all artistic genres, including works by Repin, Nolde and Richter, as well as special exhibitions on specific topics and artists.

=== Museum of Medical & Pharmaceutical History ===
Insight into the history of medicine and pharmaceuticals: exhibition of historic instruments, collection of pathology specimens, interior of an old pharmacy and a doctor's office.

=== Kiel Municipal Gallery of Contemporary Arts ===
New contemporary art: exhibitions of regional and international contemporary art, art from the Baltic Sea region, permanent exhibition of the works of the Expressionist artist Heinrich Ehmsen.

=== City and Maritime Museum ===
The Kiel Maritime Museum conserves traces of Kiel history: permanent exhibition on the early history of the city and exhibitions on social and cultural history. In the former fish auction hall, built in 1910: permanent exhibition on Kiel's maritime history, pier with historic ships.

=== Zoological Museum Kiel ===
The Zoological Museum of Kiel University focuses on marine science and research, It has Germany's most extensive exhibition of whale species and presents the origins of zoology in Kiel.

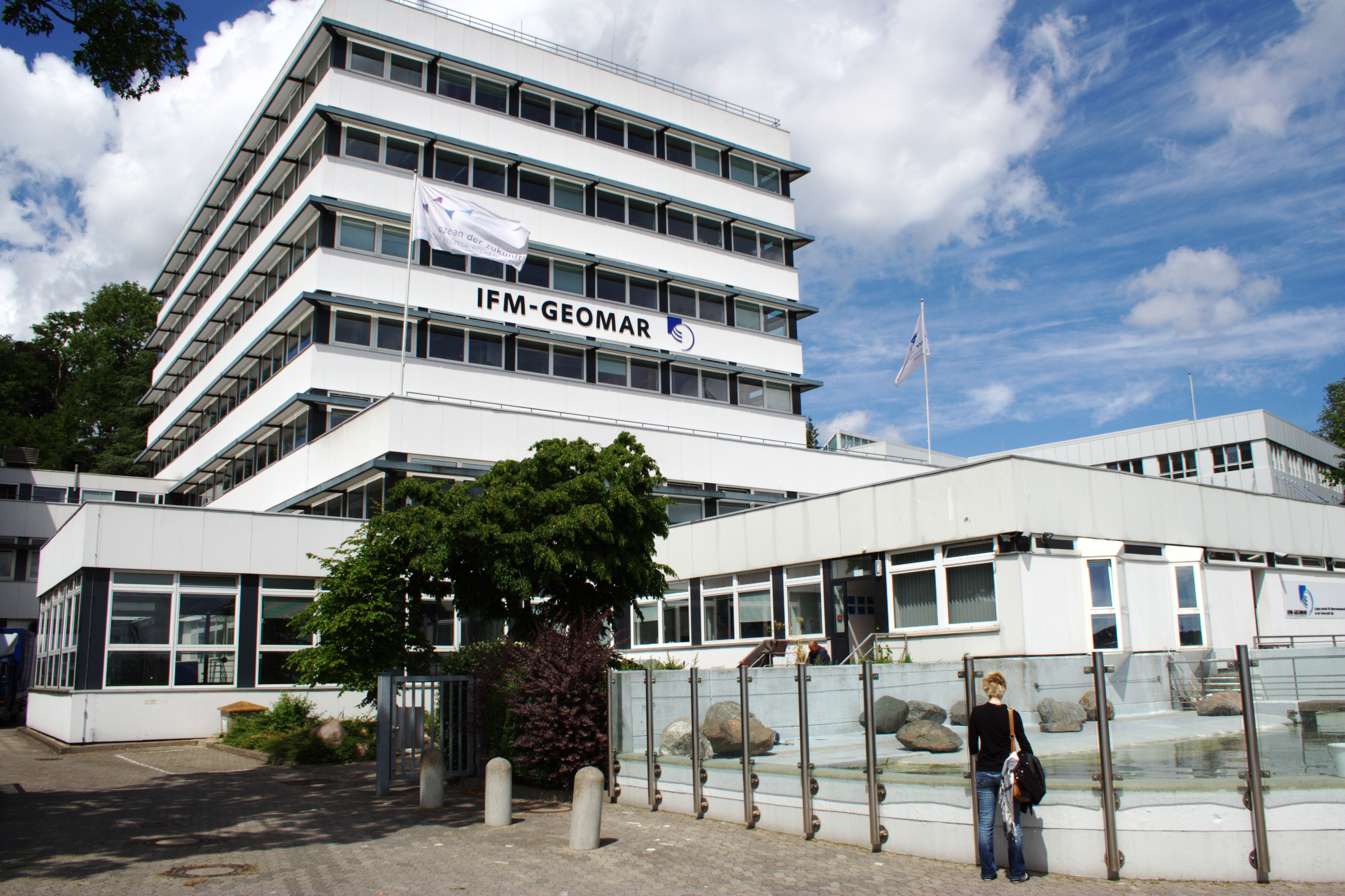
Aquarium GEOMAR

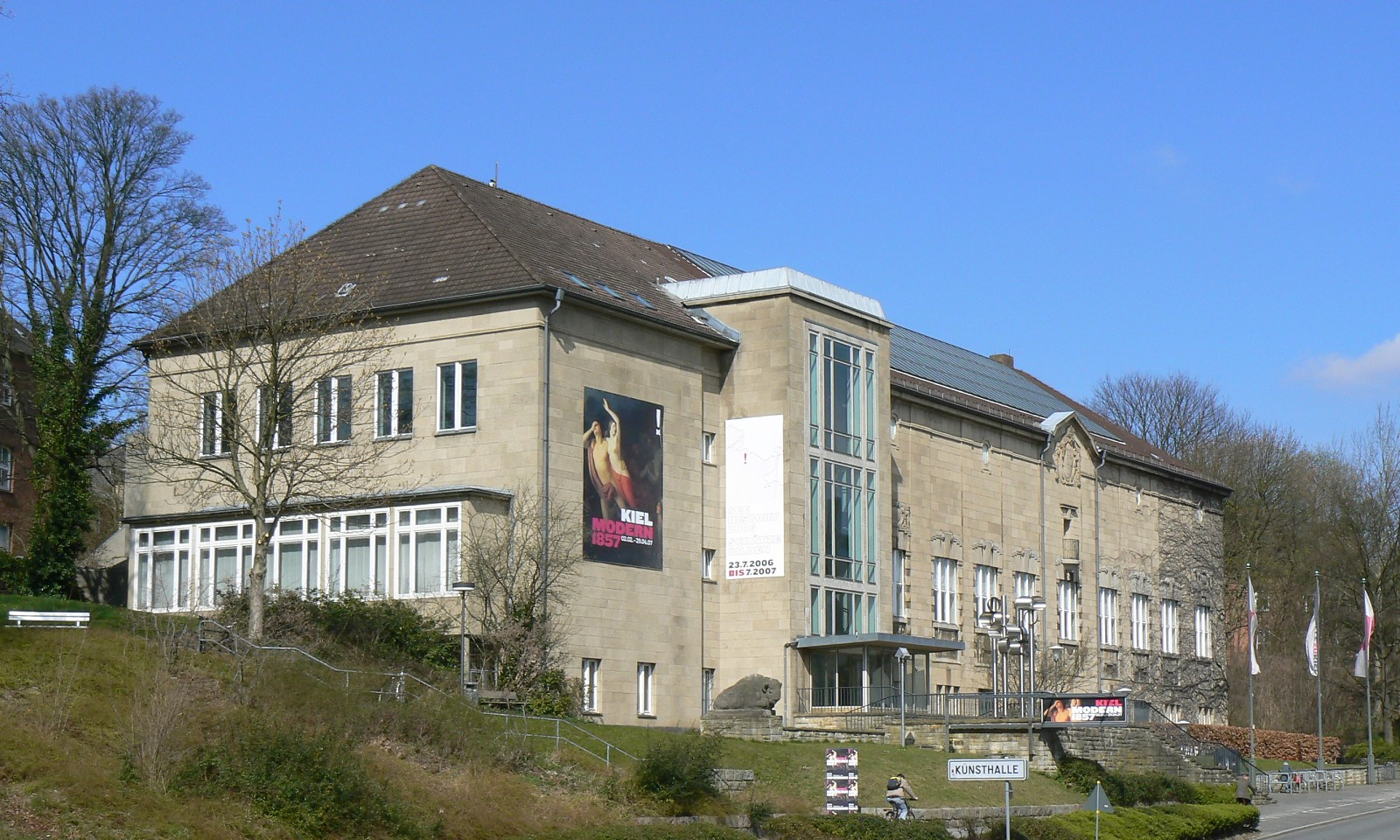
Museum of Fine Arts

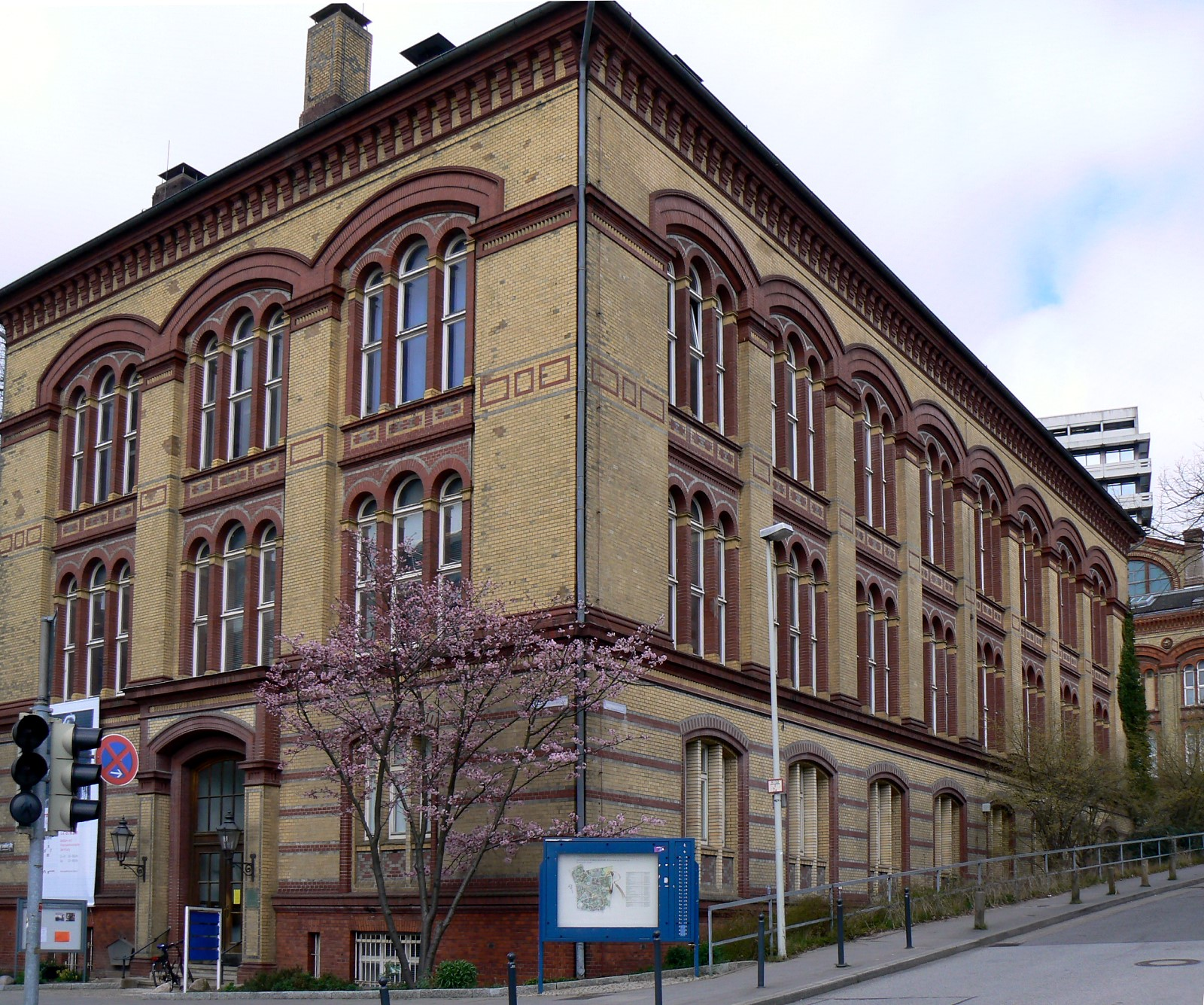
Museum of Medical & Pharmaceutical History

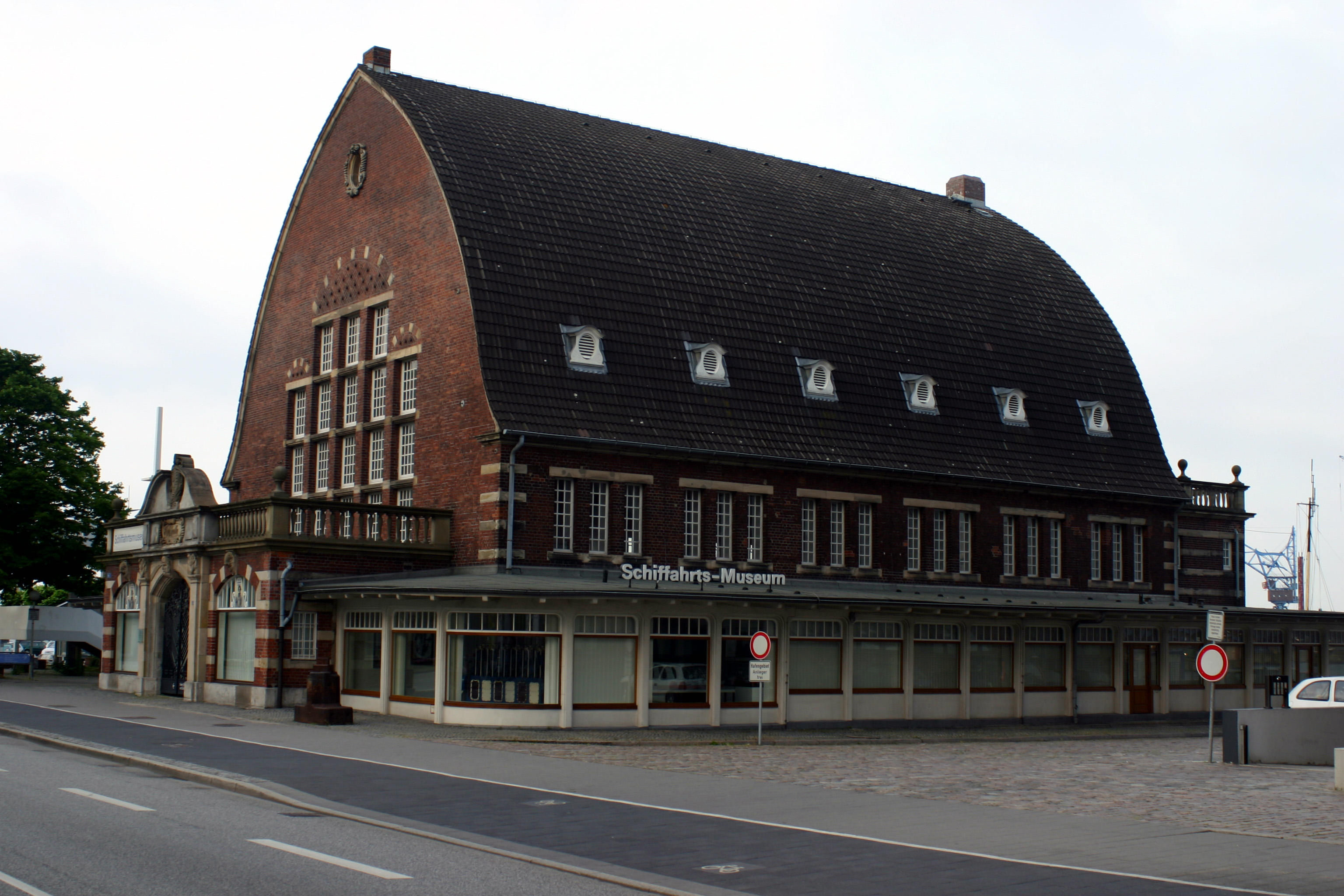
City and Maritime Museum

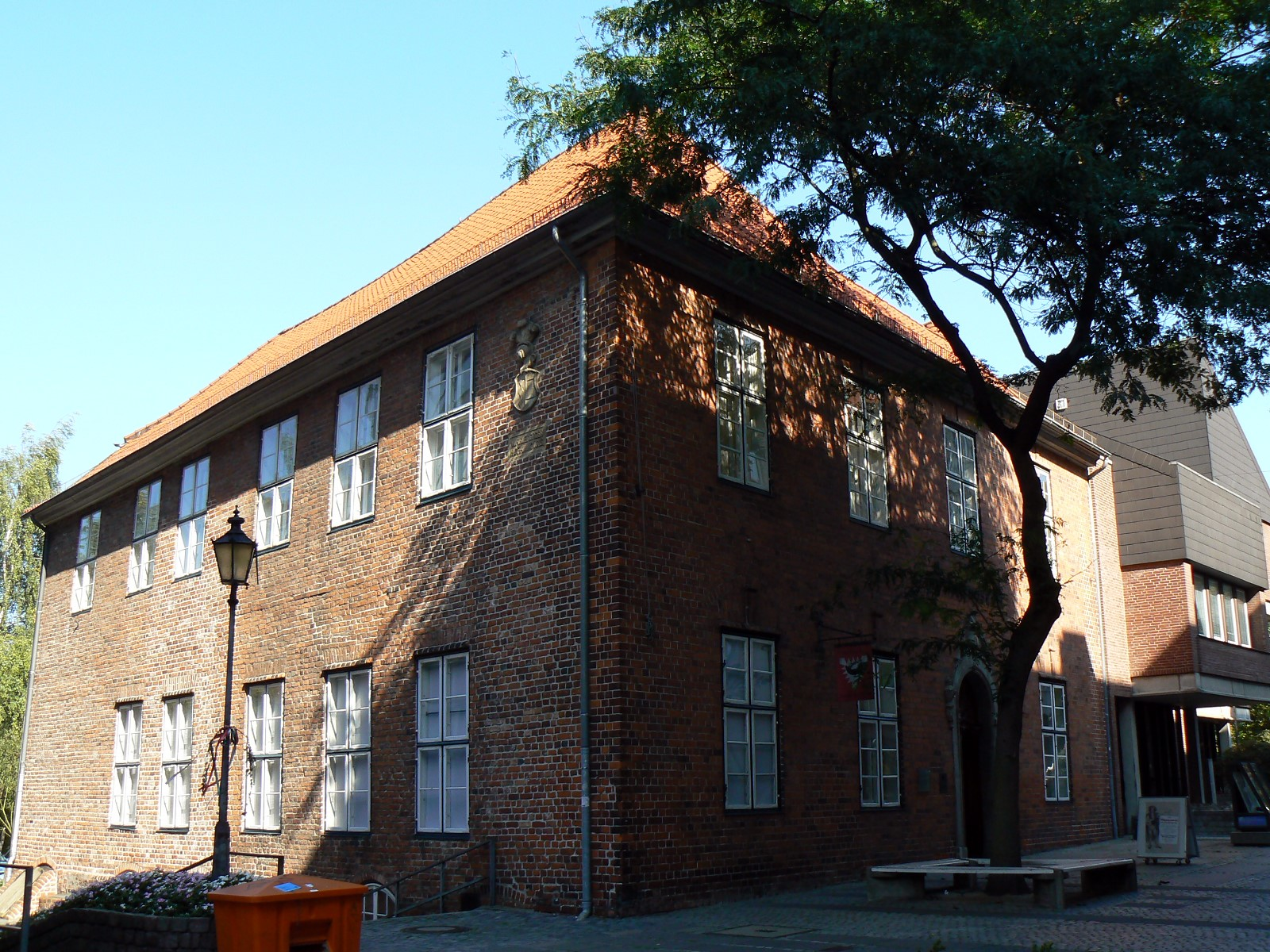
City and Maritime Museum

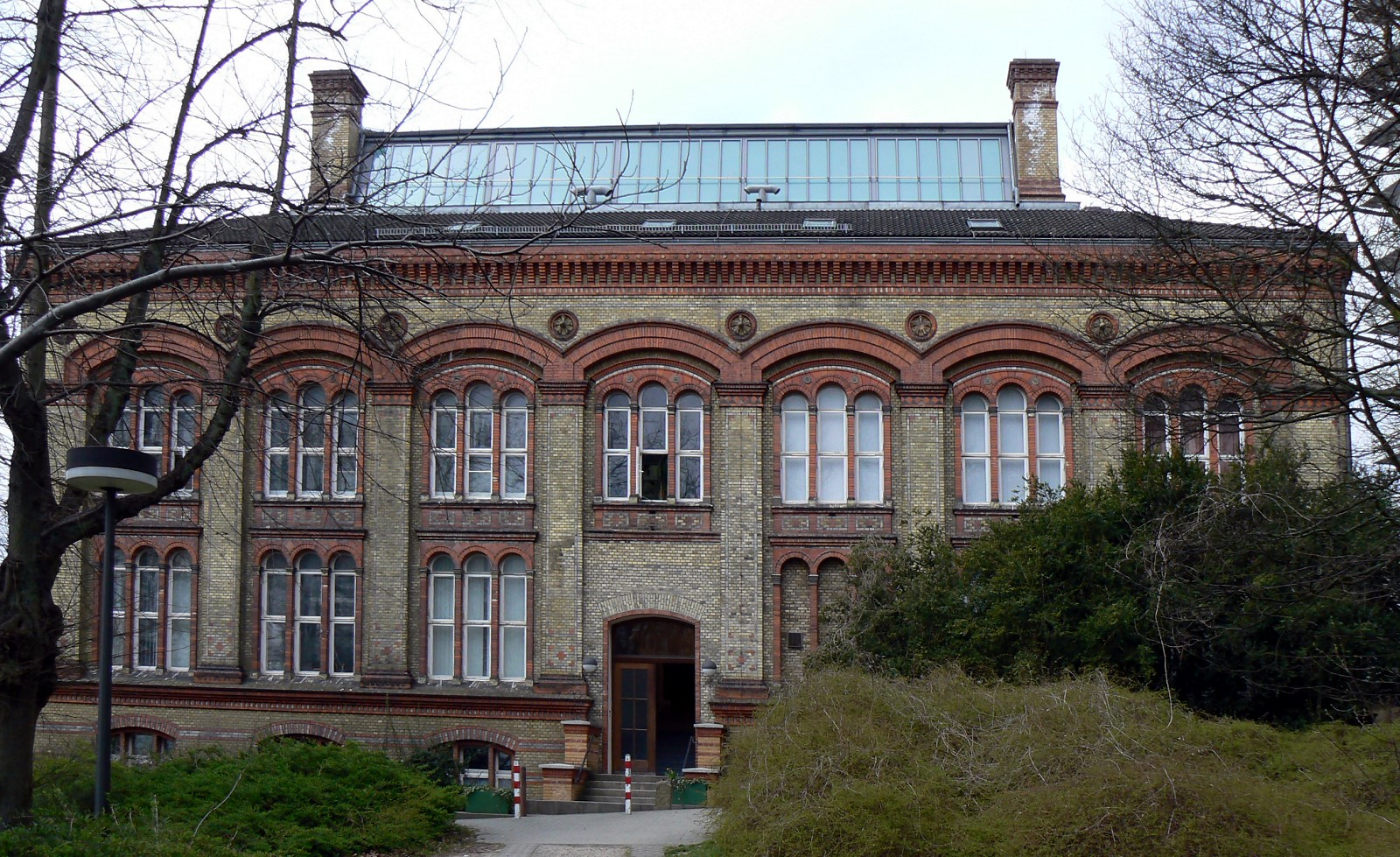
Zoological Museum Kiel

== Sources ==
- Presidential Board of Kiel University (2010). "museen am meer".
- Project Management Kiel University (2010). "Flyer museen am meer" (PDF).
- Kiel-Marketing e.V. / GmbH. "Museums and Galleries". Archived from the original on 20 November 2012.
- Museumsverband Schleswig-Holstein e. V. "Museen Nord".
