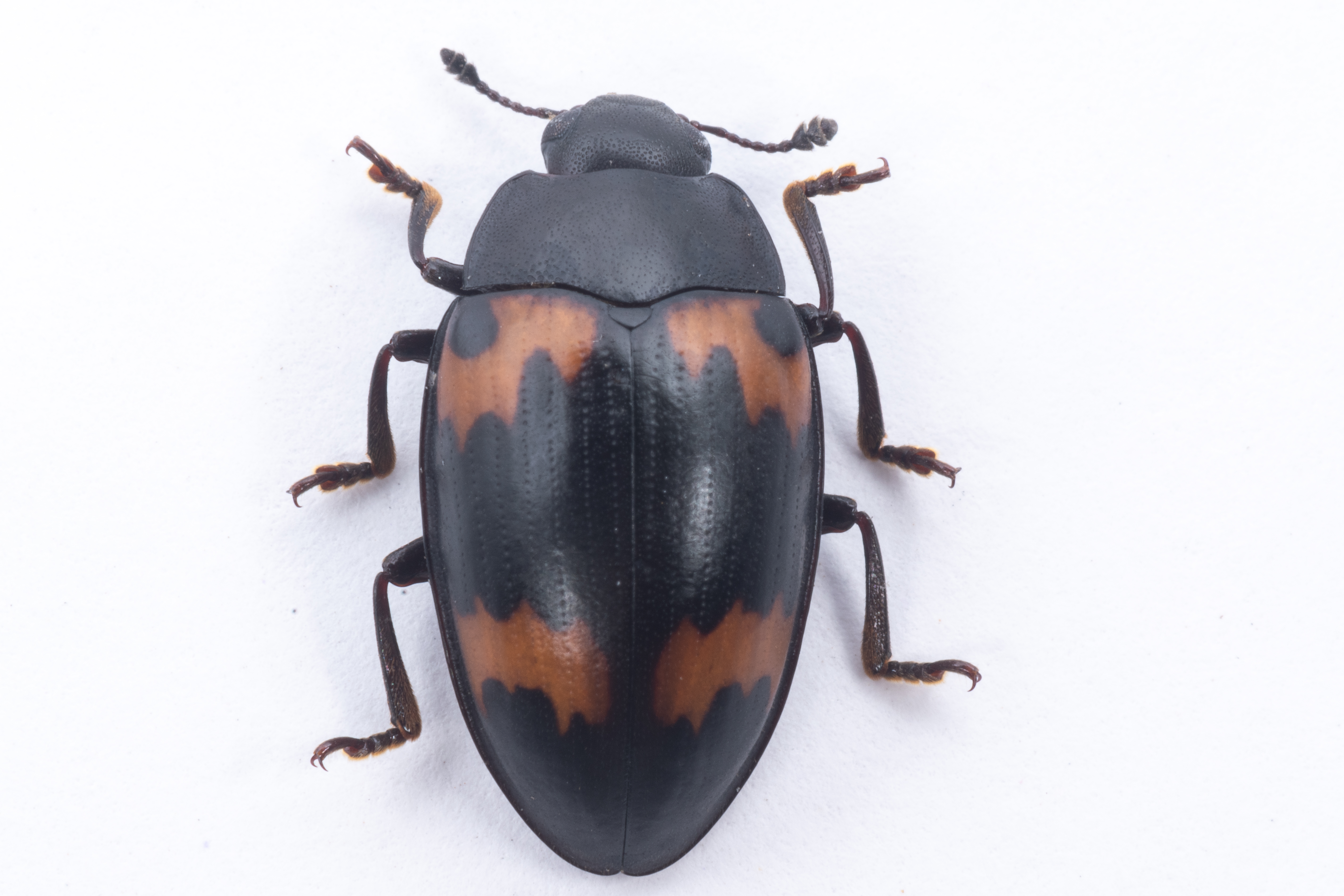
- Aulacocheilus subrotundus adult female

Scientific classification
- Kingdom: Animalia
- Phylum: Arthropoda
- Clade: Pancrustacea
- Class: Insecta
- Order: Coleoptera
- Suborder: Polyphaga
- Infraorder: Cucujiformia
- Family: Erotylidae
- Subfamily: Erotylinae
- Genus: Aulacocheilus; Dejean, 1836

Type species
- Erotylus quadripustulatus Fabricius, 1801

Synonyms
- Aulacochilus Agassiz, 1846 (unjustified emendation); Berecyntha Gistel, 1834 (nomen oblitum, non Baly, 1865)

= Aulacocheilus =

Genus of beetles

Aulacocheilus is a genus of pleasing fungus beetles (family Erotylidae. Among their family, they are placed in the subfamily Encaustinae (or tribe Encaustini if the subfamily Erotylinae is more widely defined). This genus is known from Indo-Australian region, occurring from South Asia south of the Himalayas through China to Japan, and throughout Southeast Asia and the Wallacea to eastern Australia. One species found in southern to southeastern Europe and several from Africa are traditionally also placed here; it is not certain if this is correct.

These are smalllish oval beetles with a rounded back. Like their closest relatives, Aulacocheilus adults often are waxy black with contrasting reddish blotches or irregular bands on the wings, usually with a soft, "molten"-looking margin – hence the name Encaustinae/Encaustini, from Ancient Greek ἔγκαυστος (enkaustos), "hot wax painting". Some species are iridescent, which is rare in Erotylidae.

== Taxonomy and systematics ==
The genus name was often written Aulacochilus, an unjustified emendation popularized by Louis Agassiz in 1846 and formally established by Ludwig Redtenbacher in 1858. However, it was used as Aulaocheilus by French authors around 1840 already. Commonly, it was attributed to Louis Chevrolat's 1842 usage, with the "Erotylus" javanus of Félix Guérin-Méneville designated as type species in 1989. But when Guérin-Méneville established this species in 1841, he already used Aulacocheilus as a subgenus of Erotylus, making it an available genus-group name; the common attribution of the genus to Chevrolat thus was mistaken.

Eventually, it turned out that the genus had in fact been first established in 1836 already – in Pierre Dejean's re-issue of his Catalogue des coléoptères, which contained the first four books but not yet the fifth. Dejean's subsequent use of the genus name in the fifth volume was known to have preceded Guérin-Méneville and Chevrolat, but had been dismissed for supposedly lacking a type species, causing the widespread belief that Chevrolat, by his re-use (and implied validation) of Dejean's name, was the correct authority. But when Dejean established Aulacocheilus, he only put the "Erotylus" quadripustulatus of Johan Fabricius (described in 1801 already) in there, making this the type species by default.

Even before Dejean, Johannes Gistel had proposed the name Berecyntha for the same beetles, but Gistel was suspected of habitual scientific fraud, and like many names he proposed Berecyntha never found common use and became a nomen oblitum ("forgotten name"). Its later re-employment by Joseph Baly for some leaf beetles now in genus Aplosonyx is thus legitimate and valid.

Regardless of whether they are ranked together in a subfamily or tribe, Aulacocheilus is generally considered to be closely related to genus Encaustes; Metallencaustes might be closer still and could even warrant inclusion in Aulacocheilus. A close relationship btween Encaustes and Aulacocheilus is also supported by molecular phylogenetic analysis. Unexpectedly, however, Aulacochilus resolved as even more closely related to the genus Coptengis than to Encaustes; traditionally, Coptengis has been placed in the Dacninae (or Dacinini), but it might warrant moving to the Encaustinae/Encaustini.

=== Species ===
Aulacocheilus contains the following species:

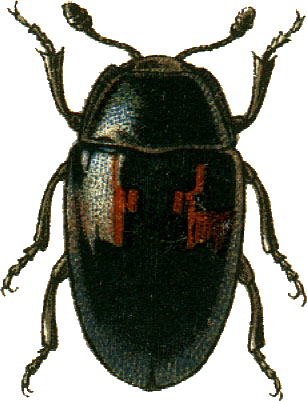
Aulacochilus luniferus adult

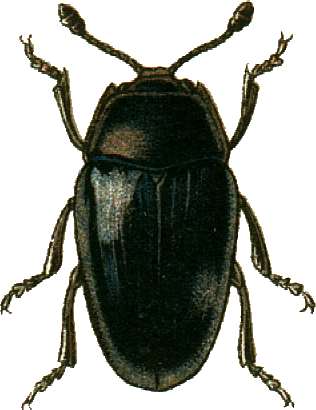
Aulacochilus sibiricus adult

- Aulacocheilus agaboides Gorham, 1883 (= A.furciferus)
- Aulacocheilus anamensis Heller, 1918 (1920)
- Aulacocheilus angustistriatus M.T.Chûjô & M.Chûjô, 1987
- Aulacocheilus ater Achard, 1922 (1923)
- Aulacocheilus atrocyaneus Motschulsky, 1858
- Aulacocheilus australis Schenkling, 1917 (1919)
- Aulacocheilus biakensis M.T.Chûjô & M.Chûjô, 1987
- Aulacocheilus biplagiatus Delkeskamp, 1957
- Aulacocheilus birmanicus Bedel, 1871
- Aulacocheilus brevis Bedel, 1872
- Aulacocheilus brevistriatus M.T.Chûjô & M.Chûjô, 1987
- Aulacocheilus capensis Lacordaire (= A.angolensis)
- Aulacocheilus chevrolati Lucas
- Aulacocheilus chrysomelinus Heller, 1918 (1920)
- Aulacocheilus circumcinctus M.T.Chûjô & M.Chûjô, 1987
- Aulacocheilus cribricollis Schenkling, 1917 (1919)
- Aulacocheilus cruciatus Csiki, 1911
- Aulacocheilus crucismelitae Gorham, 1888
- Aulacocheilus decussatus Csiki, 1911 (= A.rufocollarus)
- Aulacocheilus djampeanus Heller, 1918 (1920)
- Aulacocheilus dohrni Gorham, 1901
- Aulacocheilus doriae Bedel, 1871
- Aulacocheilus episcaphoides Gorham, 1883
- Aulacochilus erythroperonus Delkeskamp, 1935 (= A.quadriplagiatus)
- Aulacocheilus excellens Csiki, 1911
- Aulacocheilus femoralis Heller, 1918 (1920)
- Aulacocheilus flavocinctus Arrow, 1924
- Aulacocheilus fraterculus Arrow, 1921 (1922) (= A.egregius)
- Aulacocheilus gressitti M.T.Chûjô & M.Chûjô, 1987
- Aulacocheilus grouvellei Achard, 1922 (1923)
- Aulacocheilus humeralis Waterhouse, 1884
- Aulacocheilus inclitus Gorham, 1883
- Aulacocheilus indicus Gorham, 1895
- Aulacocheilus issikii Chûjô, 1936
- Aulacocheilus janthinus Lacordaire, 1842
- Aulacocheilus japonicus Crotch, 1873
- Aulacocheilus javanus (Guerin-Meneville, 1841)
- Aulacocheilus klapperichi Mader, 1941
- Aulacocheilus laoticus Arrow, 1921 (1922)
- Aulacocheilus leai (Mader, 1934) (= A.tetrastica Lea, 1921 (non Gorham, 1883: preoccupied))
- Aulacocheilus longefasciatus Delkeskamp, 1933
- Aulacocheilus luniferus (Guerin-Meneville, 1841) (= A.decoratus, A.helleri, A.maculithorax, A.punctatellus, "A.scapularis")
- Aulacocheilus maculatus Deelder, 1942
- Aulacocheilus mediocoeruleus Bedel, 1871
- Aulacocheilus micans Bedel, 1871
- Aulacocheilus mirifasciatus M.T.Chûjô & M.Chûjô, 1987
- Aulacocheilus mocsaryi Csiki, 1910
- Aulacocheilus moensicus Gorham, 1901 (= A.birmanicus Gorham, 1888 nec Bedel, 1871)
- Aulacocheilus moluccanus Gorham, 1889
- Aulacocheilus montivagus M.T.Chûjô & M.Chûjô, 1987
- Aulacocheilus murrayi Crotch
- Aulacocheilus negrosensis Chûjô, 1974
- Aulacocheilus niger Bedel, 1872 (1873)
- Aulacocheilus nigrorufus Pal, 1992
- Aulacocheilus nilgirensis Arrow, 1925
- Aulacocheilus oblongus Arrow, 1925
- Aulacocheilus oceanicus Bedel, 1872 (1873)
- Aulacocheilus octoguttatus Delkeskamp, 1957
- Aulacocheilus papuanus Csiki, 1910 (= A.astrolabicus)
- Aulacocheilus praeclarus M.T.Chûjô & M.Chûjô, 1987
- Aulacocheilus prolongatus Arrow, 1926
- Aulacocheilus propinquus Lacordaire, 1842
- Aulacocheilus quadripustulatus (Fabricius, 1801)
- Aulacocheilus quadrisignatus (Guerin-Meneville, 1841)
- Aulacocheilus quadrinotatus Delkeskamp
- Aulacocheilus rectistriatus M.T.Chûjô & M.Chûjô, 1987
- Aulacocheilus reitteri Mader, 1939
- Aulacocheilus rhomboides (Montrouzier, 1855)
- Aulacocheilus rufosexvittatus Mader, 1942
- Aulacocheilus rufovittatus Heller, 1923
- Aulacocheilus sericeus Bedel, 1871
- Aulacocheilus sexguttatus Delkeskamp, 1933 (= A.interruptus)
- Aulacocheilus shinoharai Miwa & Chûjô, 1939
- Aulacocheilus sibiricus Reitter, 1879 (= A.bedeli, A.janthinus Miwa, 1929 nec Lacordaire, 1842)
- Aulacocheilus sternalis Arrow, 1921 (1922)
- Aulacocheilus stolzii Ritsema, 1912 (= A.conjungens, A.sicardi)
- Aulacocheilus subrotundus (Macleay, 1825) (formerly in A.quadripustulatus)
- Aulacocheilus sumbawanus Achard, 1922 (1923)
- Aulacocheilus taliensis Achard, 1922 (1923)
- Aulacocheilus tayabanus Heller, 1916
- Aulacocheilus tenuistriatus M.T.Chûjô & M.Chûjô, 1987
- Aulacocheilus tetradyma Bedel, 1872 (1873)
- Aulacocheilus tetraphacus Bedel, 1871
- Aulacocheilus tricoloratus Gorham, 1896
- Aulacocheilus violaceus Germar, 1824
- Aulacocheilus vitalisi Arrow, 1921 (1922)
- Aulacocheilus xingtaiensis Zhao, Ren, Cheng, Huang & Li 2018

Subgenera have been proposed for several unusual Aulacocheilus species from Melanesia which have distinctive traits (body shape, thorax lines and elytra punctures) in a "mosaic" fashion; as the genus is highly diverse in this region, and with most species still assigned to the nominate subgenus Aulacocheilus (Aulacocheilus), this arrangement must be considered provisional:

- Aulacocheilus (Aulacocheilus) Dejean, 1836 – type species A.quadripustulatus (Sri Lanka and eastern India through Southeast Asia into Wallacea at least to Sumbawa)

Impressed lengthwise lines between the coxae on all three thorax segments

- Aulacocheilus (Caulaochilus) M.T.Chûjô & M.Chûjô, 1987 – type species A.moluccanus (New Guinea region from Misool to Normanby Island)

Coxal lines on pro- and mesothorax; shape rounded, elytra with scattered punctuations.

- Aulacocheilus (Laucaochilus) M.T.Chûjô & M.Chûjô, 1987 – type species A.gressitti (New Guinea), also A.angustistriatus, A.brevistriatus, and A.tenuistriatus

Coxal lines on pro- and mesothorax; shape rounded, elytra with lengthwise stripes of punctuations.

- Aulacocheilus (Olacauchilus) M.T.Chûjô & M.Chûjô, 1987 – type species A.mirifasciatus (New Guinea)

Coxal lines only on prothorax; shape elongated, elytra with scattered punctuations.

- Aulacocheilus (Ulacaochilus) M.T.Chûjô & M.Chûjô, 1987 – type species A.montivagus (New Guinea)

Coxal lines only on prothorax; shape elongated, elytra with lengthwise stripes of punctuations.
