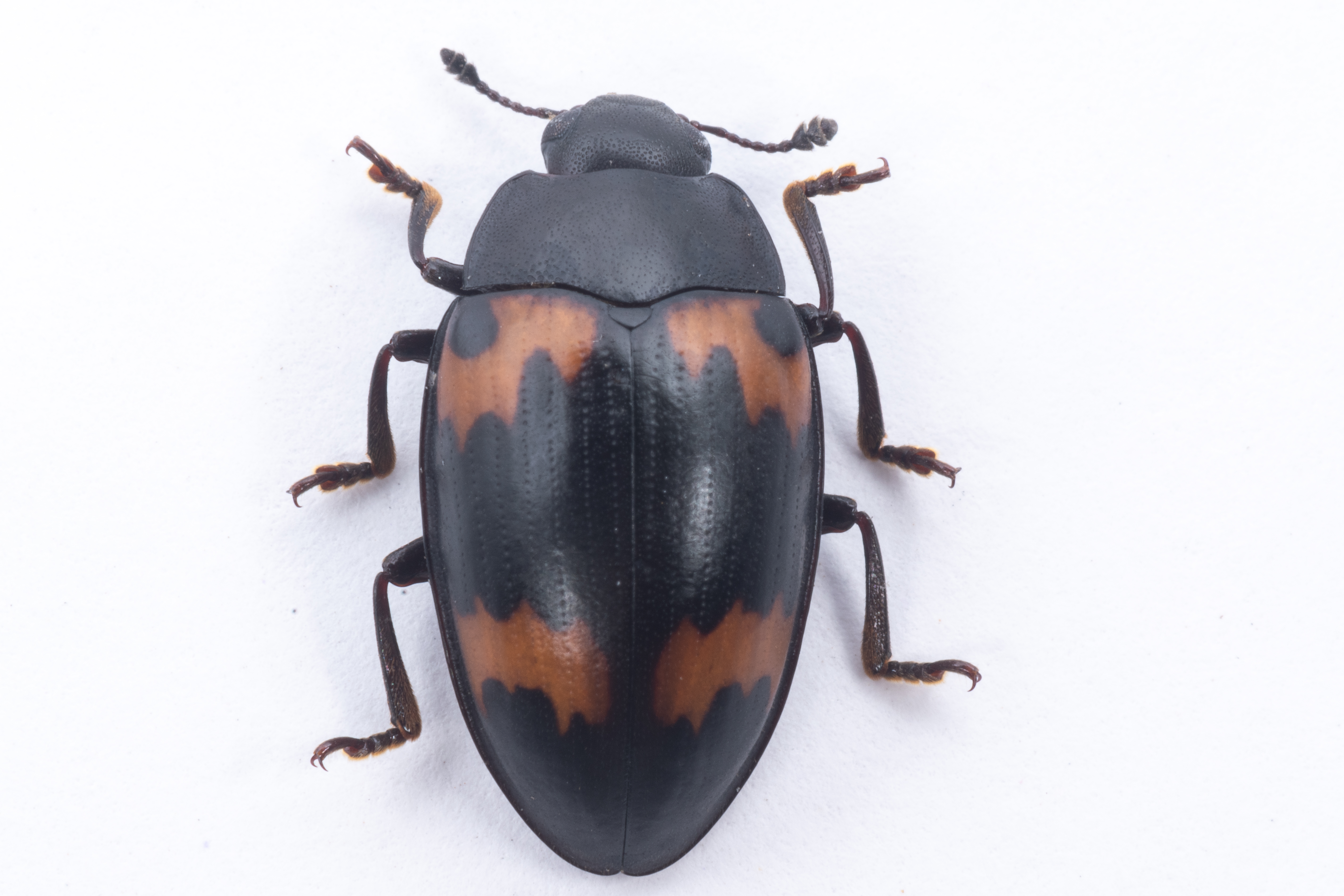
- Female
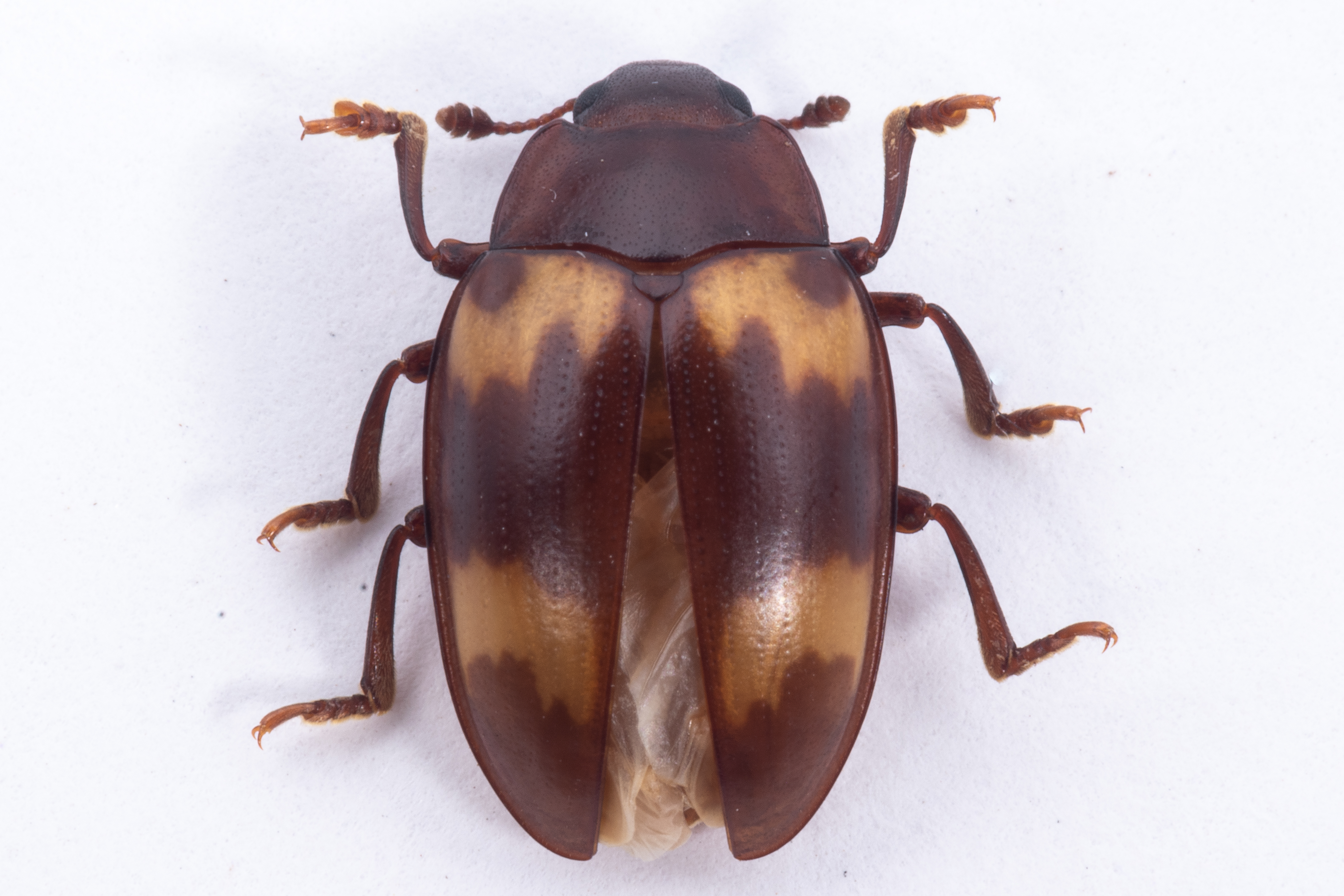
- Male

Scientific classification
- Kingdom: Animalia
- Phylum: Arthropoda
- Class: Insecta
- Order: Coleoptera
- Suborder: Polyphaga
- Infraorder: Cucujiformia
- Family: Erotylidae
- Genus: Aulacocheilus
- Species: A. subrotundus

Binomial name
- Aulacocheilus subrotundus (Macleay, 1825)

= Aulacocheilus subrotundus =

Species of beetle

Aulacocheilus subrotundus is a species of pleasing fungus beetle in the family Erotylidae. It was originally described by William Sharp Macleay in 1825 and later incorrectly treated as a synonym of Aulacocheilus quadripustulatus. A 2025 taxonomic revision based on type material and fresh specimens reinstated A. subrotundus as a distinct and valid species.

== Taxonomy ==
The species was first described as Engis subrotunda by Macleay in 1825 from Java and Sumatra. Jean Théodore Lacordaire, Belgian entomologist, later placed it in synonymy with A. quadripustulatus, a treatment that was repeated for more than a century. Ernest Marie Louis Bedel, French entomologist, questioned this synonymy, but subsequent authors continued to treat the taxa as the same species.

A comprehensive examination of the holotypes housed at the Natural History Museum, London (NHML), and the Zoological Museum of Kiel University (ZMUK) demonstrated clear morphological differences, leading Tawde, Pawar, and Patwardhan (2025) to formally reinstate A. subrotundus as a valid species.

== Description ==
Adults are sub-oval, moderately convex, and widest near the elytral base. The body is predominantly black, with yellowish-brown antennae, palps, and tarsi. The elytra bear two jagged yellow transverse bands, one at the basal margin with a dark humeral spot, and one at the apical third. These irregular but symmetrical yellow bands readily distinguish A. subrotundus from other Indian congeners.

The antennae have 11 antennomeres with a compact three-segmented club. The pronotum is transverse and coarsely punctate, and the hind wings possess a characteristic stridulatory area on the inner surface of the elytra.

The adult male measures about 10.6 mm in body length; the female about 12.0 mm.

== Distribution ==
A. subrotundus is known from Java, Sumatra, and western India. Recent confirmed specimens originate from Mumbai, Maharashtra. Historical records from the Andaman Islands likely correspond to A. subrotundus rather than A. quadripustulatus, whose presence in India is now considered doubtful.

== Biology and ecology ==
The species is strictly mycophagous, completing its development on bracket fungi belonging to the family Irpicaceae (Order Polyporales). Adults and larvae feed on the hymenium and internal tissues of the fungal fruiting bodies. In the absence of fungi, adults may be found sheltering under bark.

=== Life cycle ===
The full life cycle occurs from September to December. Mating occurs on the host fungus or under tree bark. The eggs are elongate, cylindrical and about 1.85 mm long. The larvae are oligopod type, with stiff bristles and hook-shaped urogomphi. Four 4 instars have been described. The pupae are exarate and about 10 mm long. Adults emerge within the fungal fruiting bodies.

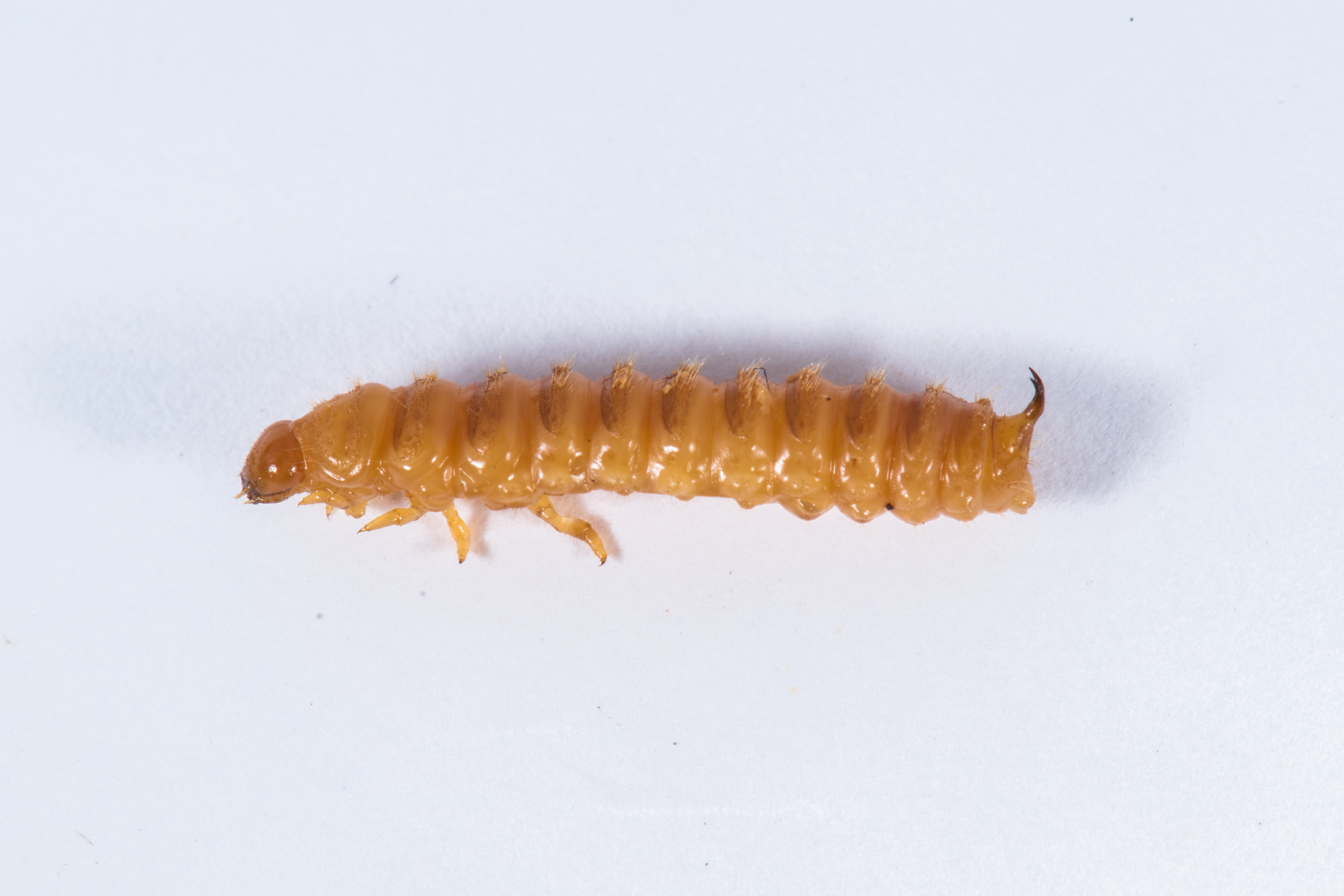
Larva (last instar)

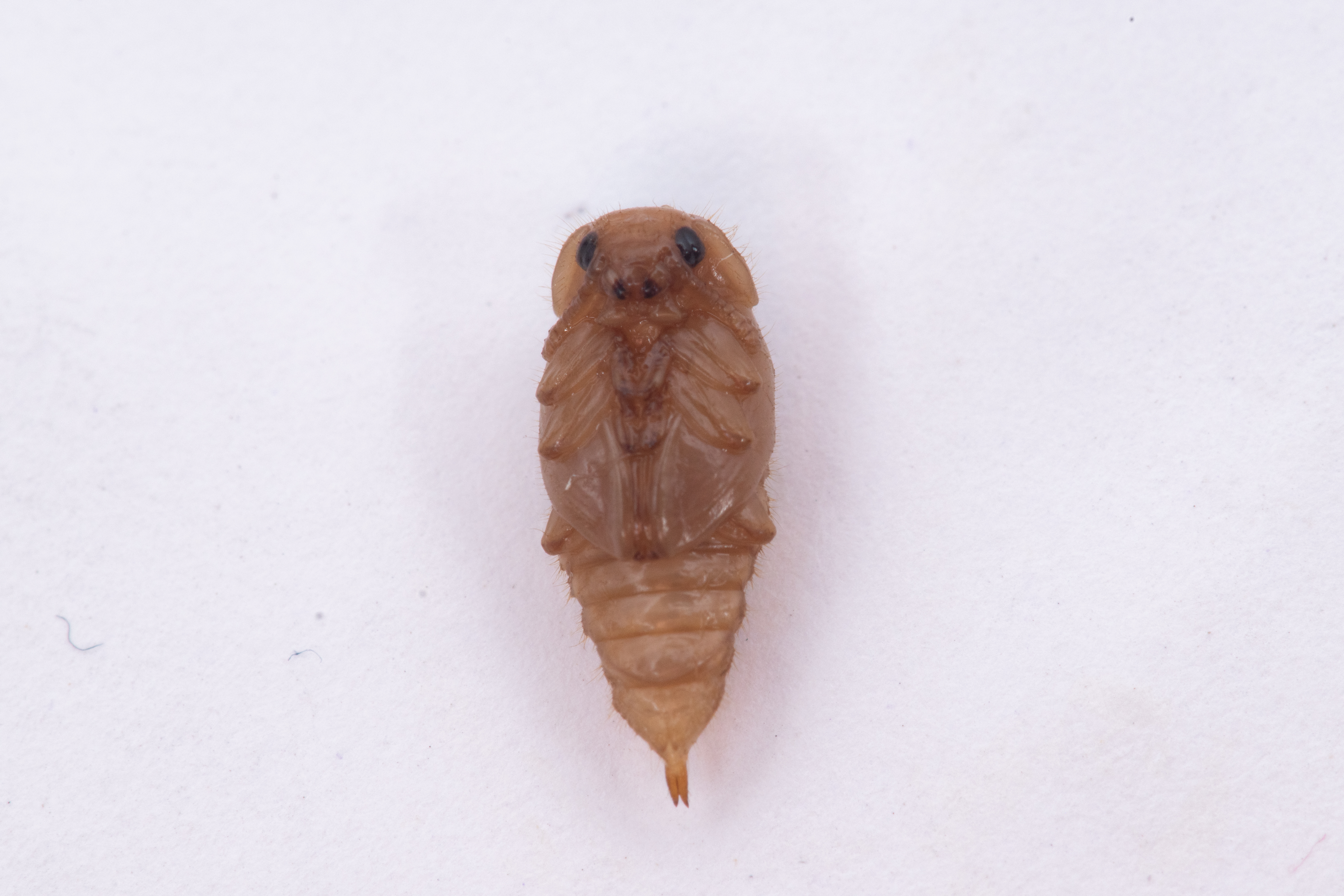
Pupa of Aulacocheilus subrotundus

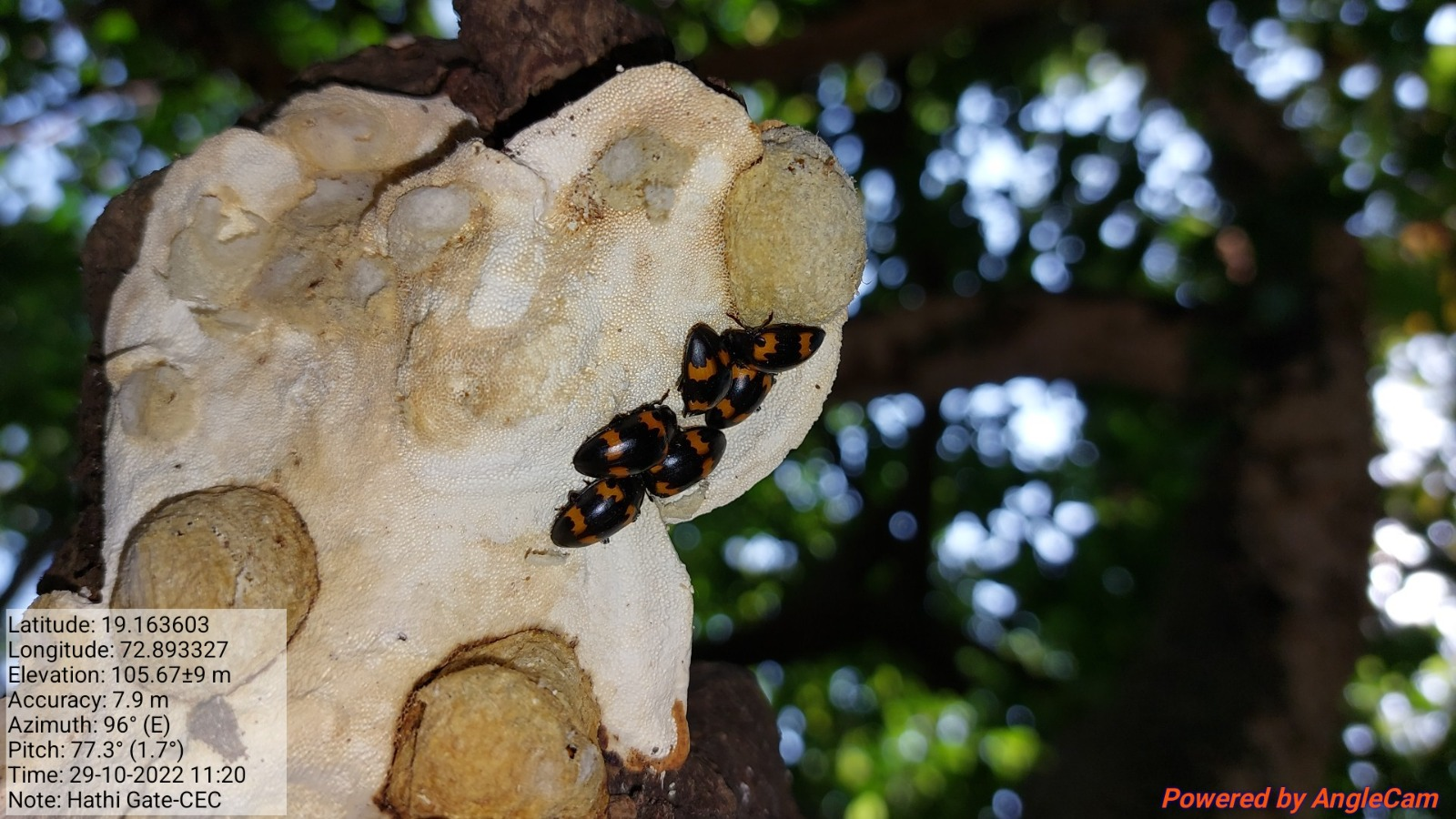
Adult Aulacocheilus subrotundus feeding on bracket fungus (Irpicaceae)

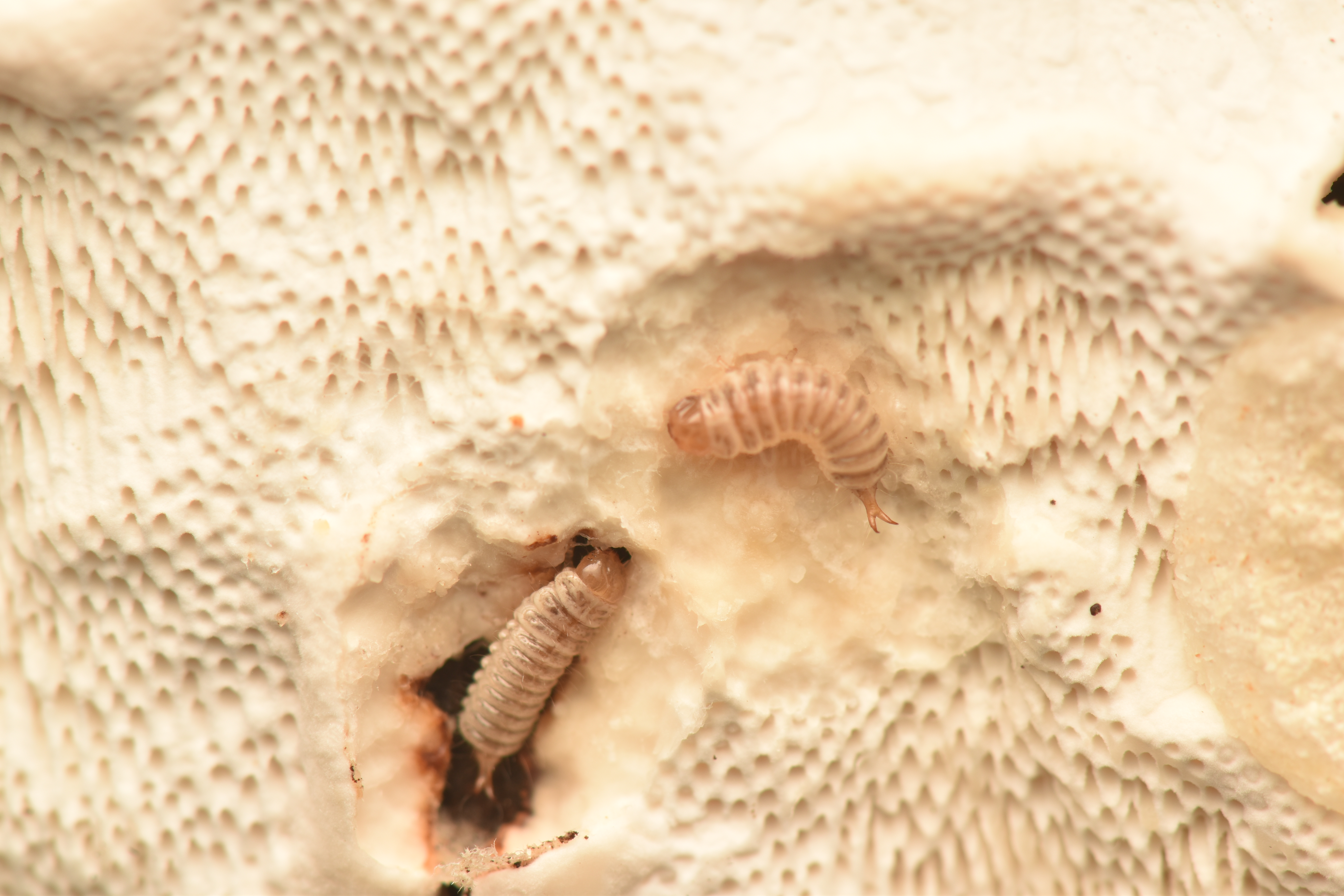
Larva of Aulacocheilus subrotundus on host fungus

== Type material ==
- Holotype of A. subrotundus – Java, deposited in the Natural History Museum, London (NHML).
- Holotype of A. quadripustulatus (comparison) – Sumatra, deposited in the Zoological Museum of Kiel University (ZMUK).
