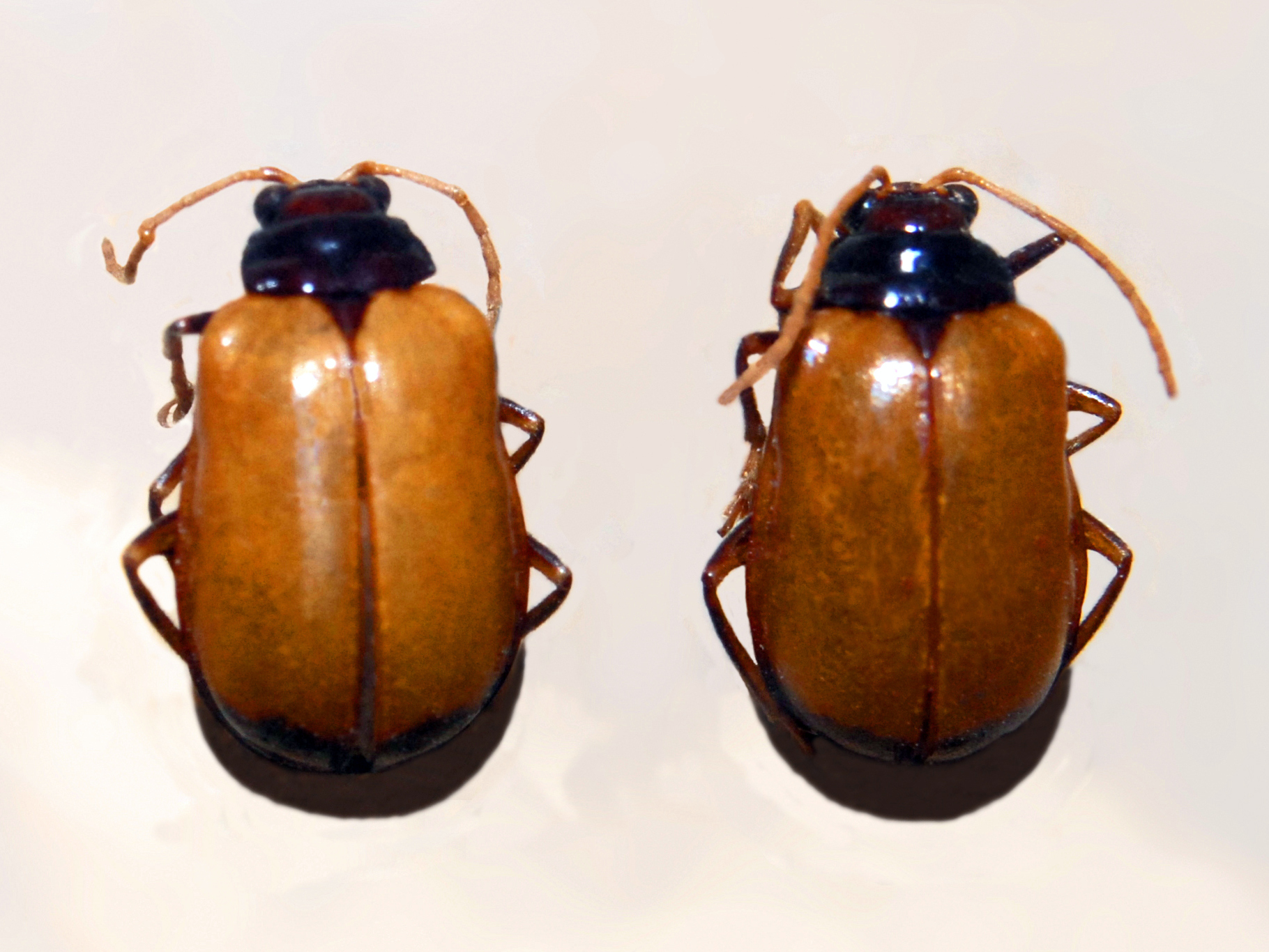
- Aplosonyx nigricollis from Nias. Mounted specimen

Scientific classification
- Kingdom: Animalia
- Phylum: Arthropoda
- Clade: Pancrustacea
- Class: Insecta
- Order: Coleoptera
- Suborder: Polyphaga
- Infraorder: Cucujiformia
- Family: Chrysomelidae
- Tribe: Hylaspini
- Genus: Aplosonyx
- Species: A. nigricollis

Binomial name
- Aplosonyx nigricollis Duvivier, 1885

Synonyms
- Haplosonyx nigricollis Duvivier, 1885

= Aplosonyx nigricollis =

Species of beetle

Aplosonyx nigricollis is a species of beetle belonging to the family Chrysomelidae. It can be found in Malay Peninsula and in Indonesia (Nias, Mentawai Islands, Batu Islands).
