= Kiel Maritime Museum =

Museum in Kiel

Coordinates: 54°19′22″N 10°08′37″E

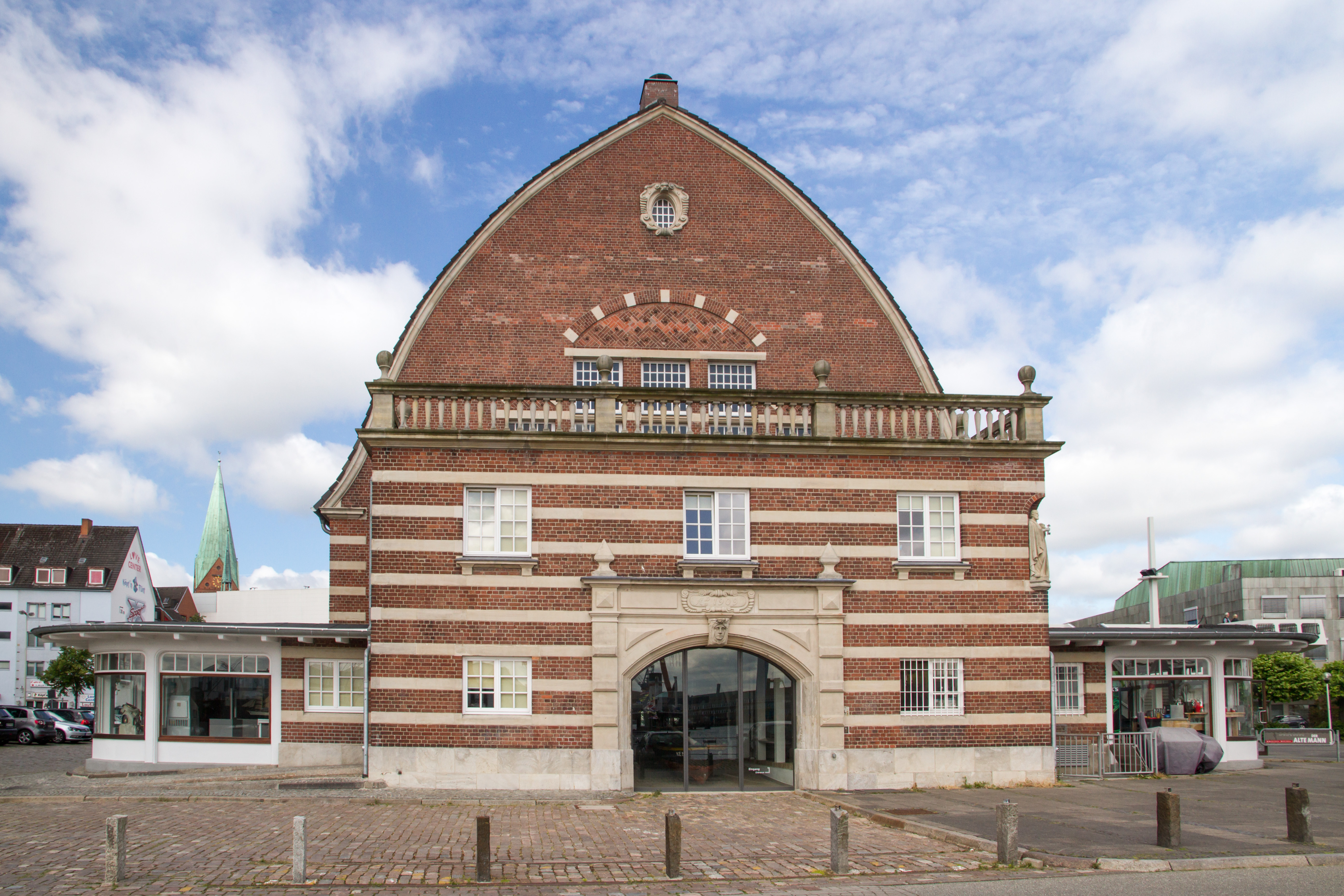
Kiel Maritime Museum

Kiel Maritime Museum (German - Schifffahrtsmuseum Kiel) is a museum in the German city of Kiel. It was established in 1978 in what had been the fish-auction hall in the Sartorikai area of the city. It shows the maritime history of Kiel.

In front of the museum is the lantern of the Alexander von Humboldt lightship, and docked nearby are the rescue boat Hindenburg, the fireboat Kiel, the passenger ship Stadt Kiel, and the buoy tender Bussard, all now museum ships.

Kiel Maritime Museum participates in Museen am Meer, a partnership of eight museums.

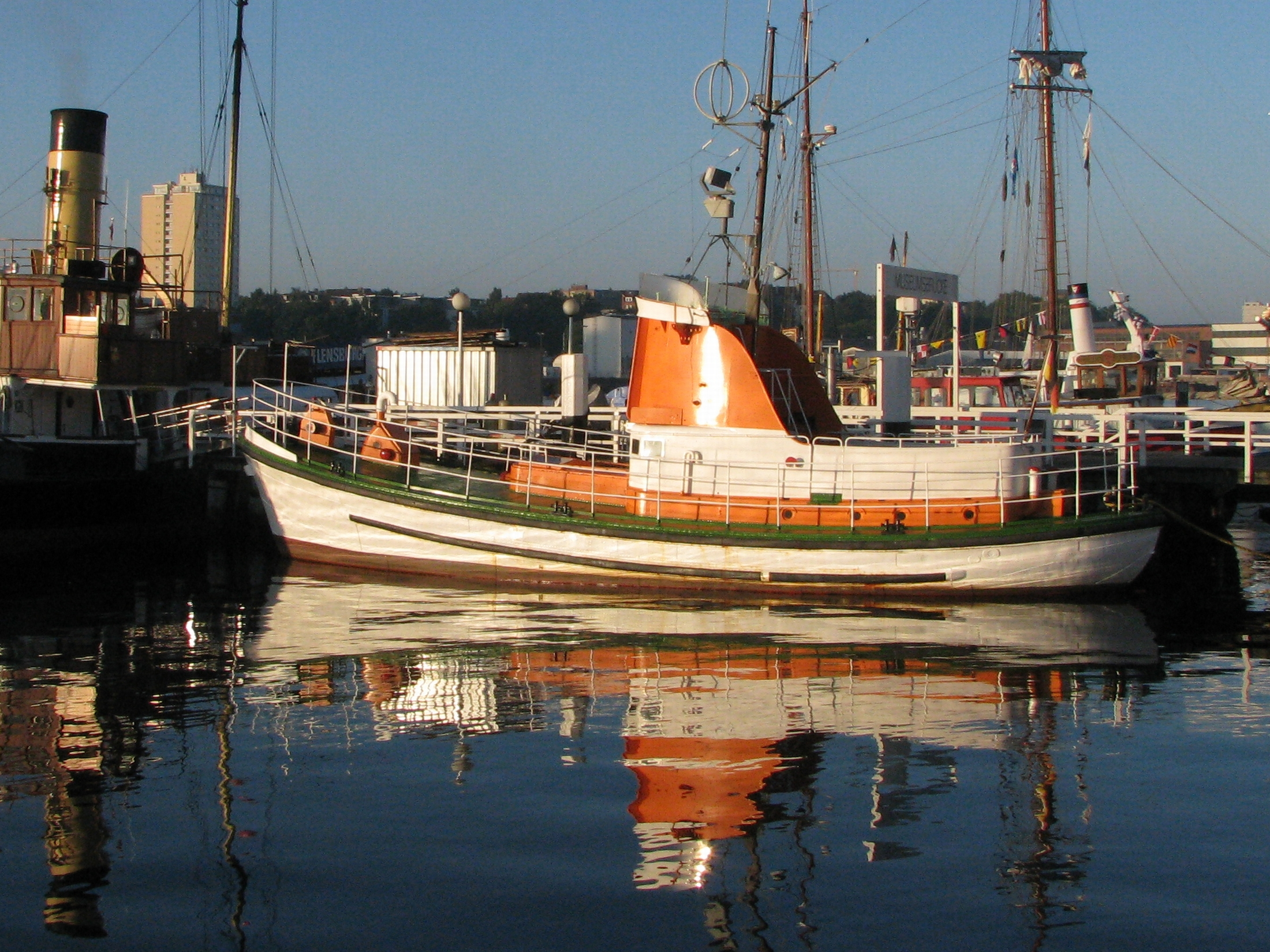
Rescue boat Hindenburg

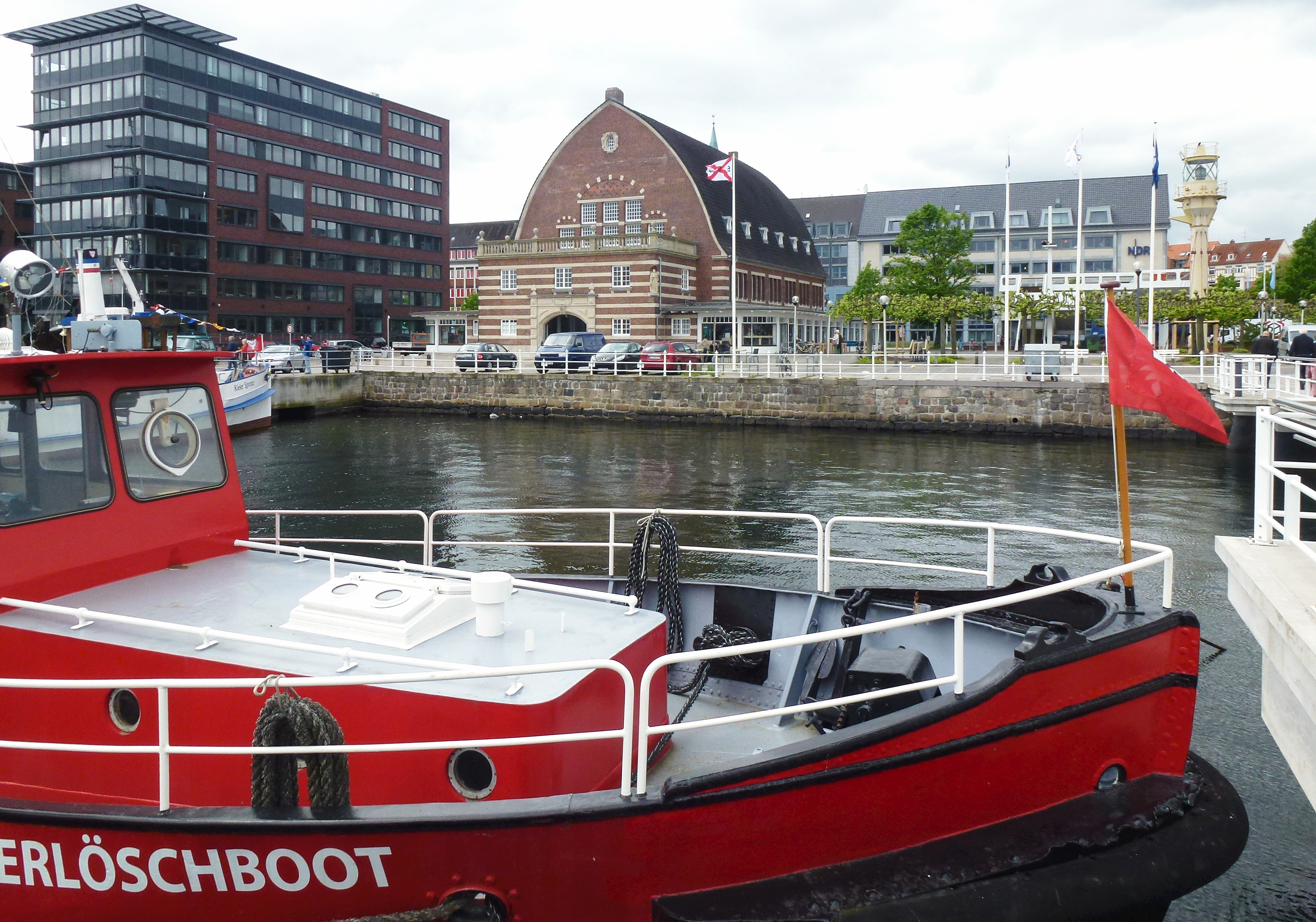
Fireboat Kiel

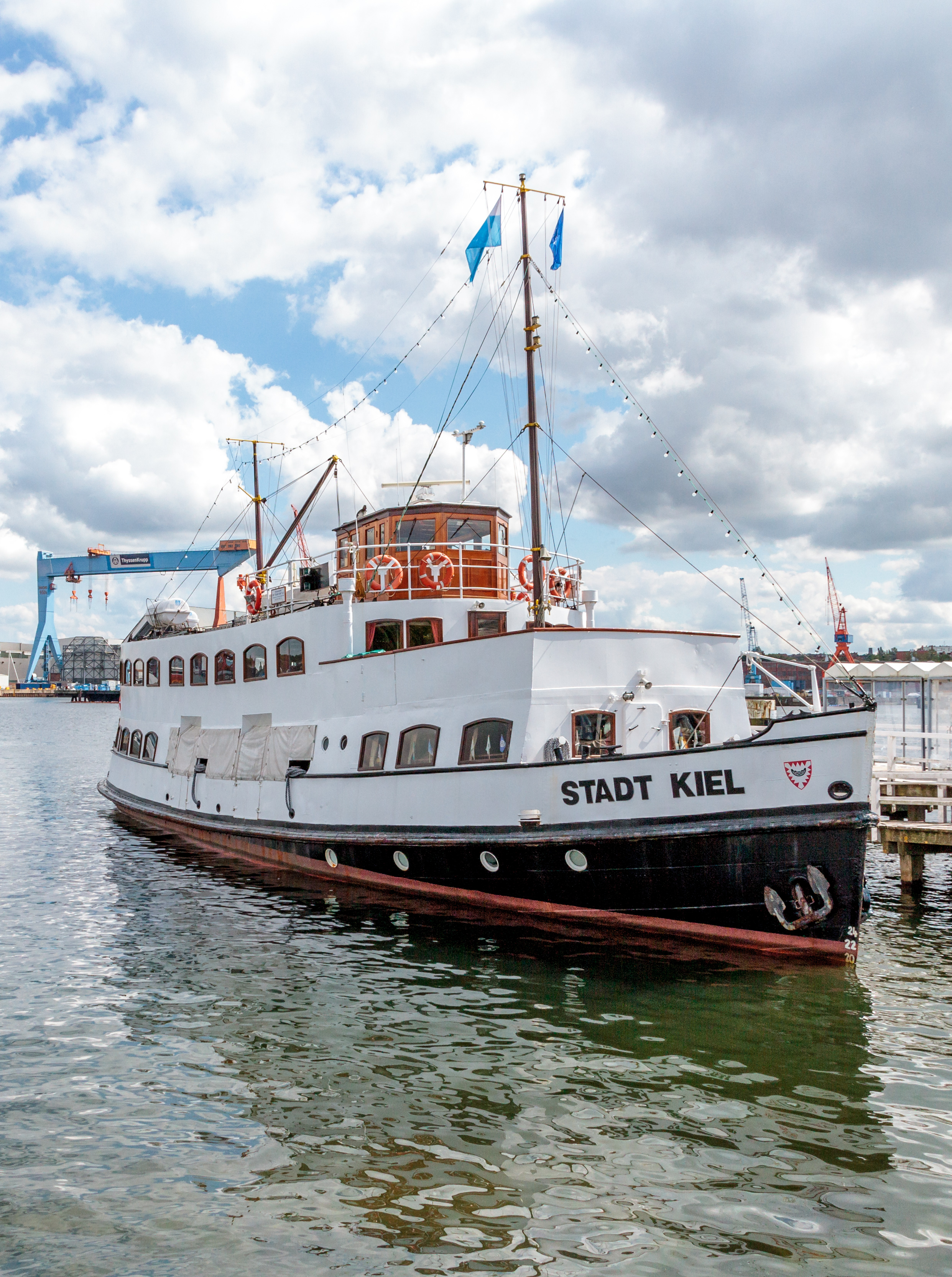
Passenger ship Stadt Kiel

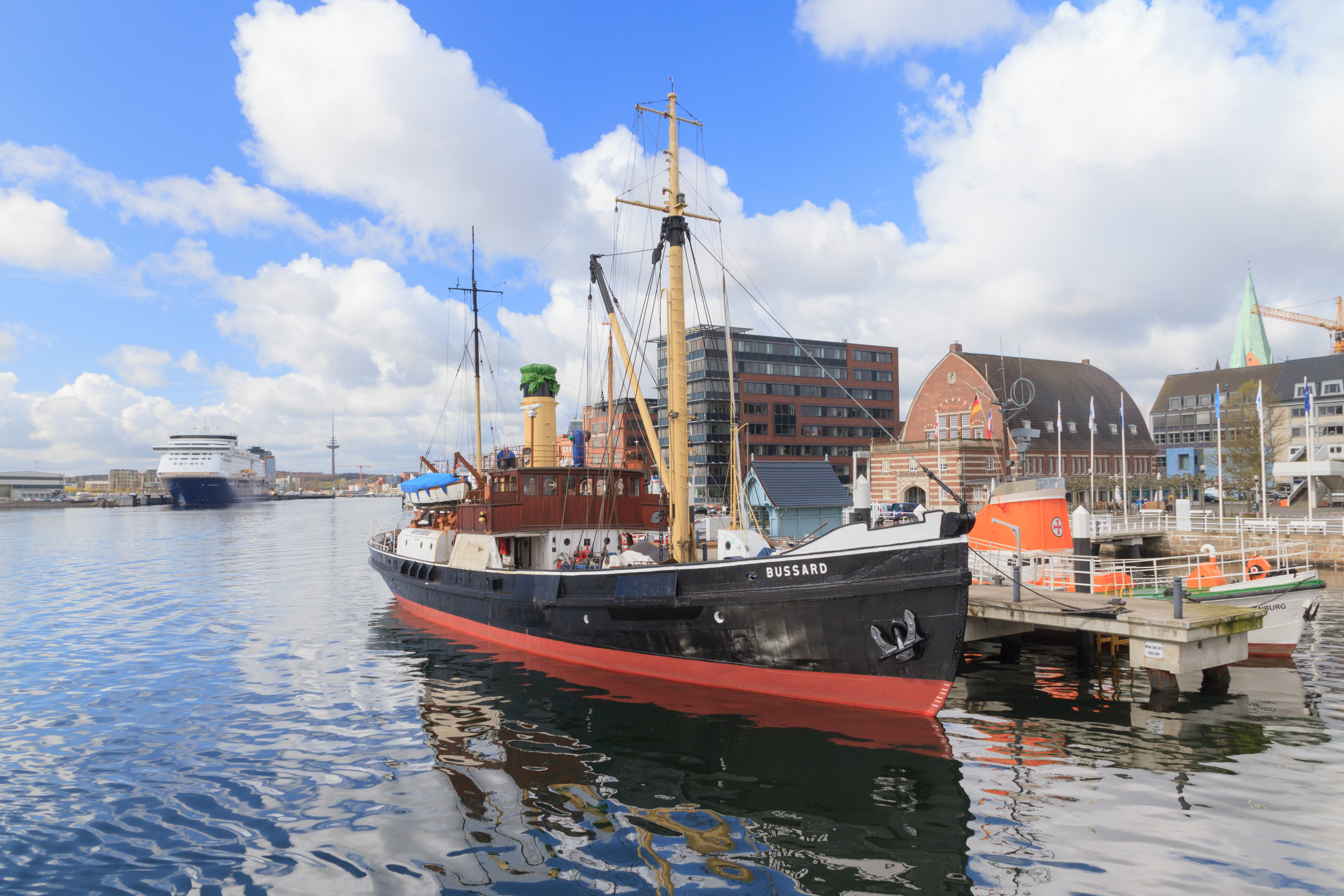
Buoy tender Bussard
