= Hans Tintelnot =

German art historian

Hans Julius Leonhard Wilhelm August Tintelnot (27 September 1909 − 2 January 1970) was a German art historian and painter. He was particularly concerned with the Baroque era.

== Life ==
Born in Lemgo, Tintelnot was a son of the colonial goods wholesaler and coffee roaster Wilhelm Tintelnot and his wife Ida, née Dreves.

Tintelnot attended the Engelbert-Kaempfer-Gymnasium where Karl Meier was one of his teachers. At his suggestion he wrote a work on Tombs and Epitaphs of Lippe in 1929. In the same year Tintelnot passed his Abitur. Supported by his uncle Leonhard Wahrburg (1860-1933), he studied art history, literary history, history and archaeology at the Ludwig-Maximilians-Universität München, the University of Vienna and the University of Breslau. There he also attended the academy of arts.

In 1936 Tintelnot married Monika Plessner, who was also an art historian. The marriage gave two daughters, born in 1937 and 1941.

In 1937 he received his doctorate under Dagobert Frey with a thesis on baroque theatre. His dissertation, in which he followed the development of theatrical decoration from the late Renaissance to the late baroque classicism and established the parallels between the formation of space in churches and on stage, became a standard work. Tintelnot was assistant at the Institute of Art History in Breslau. In the 1940s, Tintelnot showed himself to be German-national and dealt with the art of the Middle Ages. In 1943 he completed his habilitation thesis with the title Die mittelalterliche Baukunst Schlesiens.

When the end of the "Third Reich" became foreseeable, Tintelnot and his family first moved back to Lemgo, where he found accommodation in his parents' house and initially worked in his father's business. In addition, he organized cultural events and created watercolors, which he sold to increase the family income. In 1946 he went to the Georg-August-Universität Göttingen, where he became an associate professor in 1950 or 1951. His wife remained in Lemgo and built the Volkshochschule there. in 1950 she became the first full-time VHS director. The Tintelnot couple separated in the early post-war years.

During his time in Göttingen, when he also looked after the art collection of the university there, he wrote his works on Baroque fresco painting, the genesis of the Baroque concept and modern art since Classicism. Tintelnot started the beginning of an independent German development of fresco painting already in the courtly culture of southern Germany around 1600, which did not correspond to the widespread doctrine, and he insisted on the idea of national character expressed in works of art.

In 1959 Tintelnot moved to Kiel and took over the chair of Richard Sedlmaier as full professor at the Kunsthistorisches Institut and also became director of the Kunsthalle Kiel. On 8 June 1959 he also became chairman of the Schleswig-Holsteinischer Kunstverein. Tintelnot made a special effort to complete the collection of German art of the 19th century. Contemporary art was purchased under Tintelnot for financial reasons, mainly in the form of prints and drawings. Before his students, Tintelnot sometimes used to stage himself as a representative of past eras. At a carnival celebration of the Kunsthistorisches Institut he appeared in the costume of the cardinal Scipione Caffarelli Borghese after a marble bust by Gian Lorenzo Bernini from 1632 and had all bystanders kiss the ring.

For health reasons Tintelnot retired early in 1967. He was buried in his hometown.

A large part of his estate passed into the possession of his daughters. In the National Museum, Wrocław watercolours of Tintelnot with Wroclaw motifs were rediscovered, possibly collected for an exhibition that had been cancelled due to the outbreak of war. Posthumously, works by Tintelnot were exhibited in 2016 in the Hexenbürgermeisterhaus in Lemgo.

Tintelno died in Lemgo at the age of 60.

== Work ==
- Barocktheater und Barocke Kunst. Die Entwicklungsgeschichte der Fest- und Theater-Dekoration in ihrem Verhältnis zur bildenden Kunst, Berlin 1939
- Die barocke Freskomalerei in Deutschland. Ihre Entwicklung und europäische Wirkung, München 1951

== Literature ==
- Jens Martin Neumann: Hans Tintelnot (1909–1970), Barock in Kiel. In Hans-Dieter Nägelke (ed.): Kunstgeschichte in Kiel. 100 Jahre Kunsthistorisches Institut der Christian-Albrechts-Universität, 1893–1993. Kunsthistorischen Institut der Christian-Albrechts-Universität zu Kiel, Kiel 1994, ISBN 3-928794-11-6, pp. 79–84.
- Peter Biresch, Jürgen Scheffler: Die Anfänge der Volkshochschule Lemgo und des Lippischen Volksbildungswerkes nach 1945, Volkshochschule Lemgo, Städtisches Museum Lemgo, Bielefeld 2013, ISBN 978-3-89534-954-6, pp. 23–25
