= Wilhelm Kraiker =

German art historian and archaeologist

Wilhelm Kraiker (4 August 1899 – 24 April 1987) was a German classical archaeologist.

== Life ==
Born in Frankfurt, in 1927 Kraiker received his doctorate at Heidelberg University under Ludwig Curtius. In 1928/29 he received a travel grant of the German Archaeological Institute, afterwards he was assistant at the Heidelberg University as well as at the German Archaeological Institute in Athens and Rome; on 12 July 1937 he habilitated in Heidelberg. From June 1941 to September 1944, Kraiker worked in Athens during the German occupation in World War II for the newly formed Kunstschutz, which was subordinate to the Army High Command Quartermaster General Eduard Wagner, and was in charge from July 1942. Together with the German Archaeological Institute in Athens and the Foreign Office, this art protection department succeeded in driving the Reichsleiter Rosenberg Taskforce out of Greece. In 1943 Kraiker was appointed extraordinary professor at the University of Innsbruck. Since May 1, 1948 Kraiker represented the professorship for classical archaeology at the University of Kiel. On 1 January 1949 he was appointed full professor and at the same time director of the Antikensammlung Kiel. In 1968 he became emeritus.

Kraiker's best-known work is the Griechenlandkunde (1st edition 1955), which was written with Ernst Kirsten and which emerged from guide sheets of the German art protection for soldiers during the Second World War. The work was completely revised and reprinted in 1962.

Kraiker died in Rome aged 87.

== Publications ==
- Die Nekropolen des 12. bis 10. Jahrhunderts.
- Hellas Kunst der Griechen.
- Aigina, die Vasen des 10. bis 7. Jahrhunderts v. Chr.
- Die rotfigurigen attischen Vasen.
- Griechenlandkunde : ein Führer zu klassischen Stätten.

== Literature ==
- Julia Freifrau Hiller von Gaertringen: Deutsche Archäologische Unternehmungen im besetzten Griechenland 1941–1944. in Athenische Mitteilungen. 110, 1995, pp. 465–466.
