= Antikensammlung Kiel =

Museum in Germany

The Antikensammlung Kiel is the collection of antiquities held by the Classical Archaeology Department of Kiel University, housed in nine basement rooms in the Kunsthalle Kiel. It is the only museum of its kind in the state of Schleswig-Holstein and includes internationally important collections of pottery from Magna Graecia as well as classical sculptures and casts of such sculptures.

== History ==
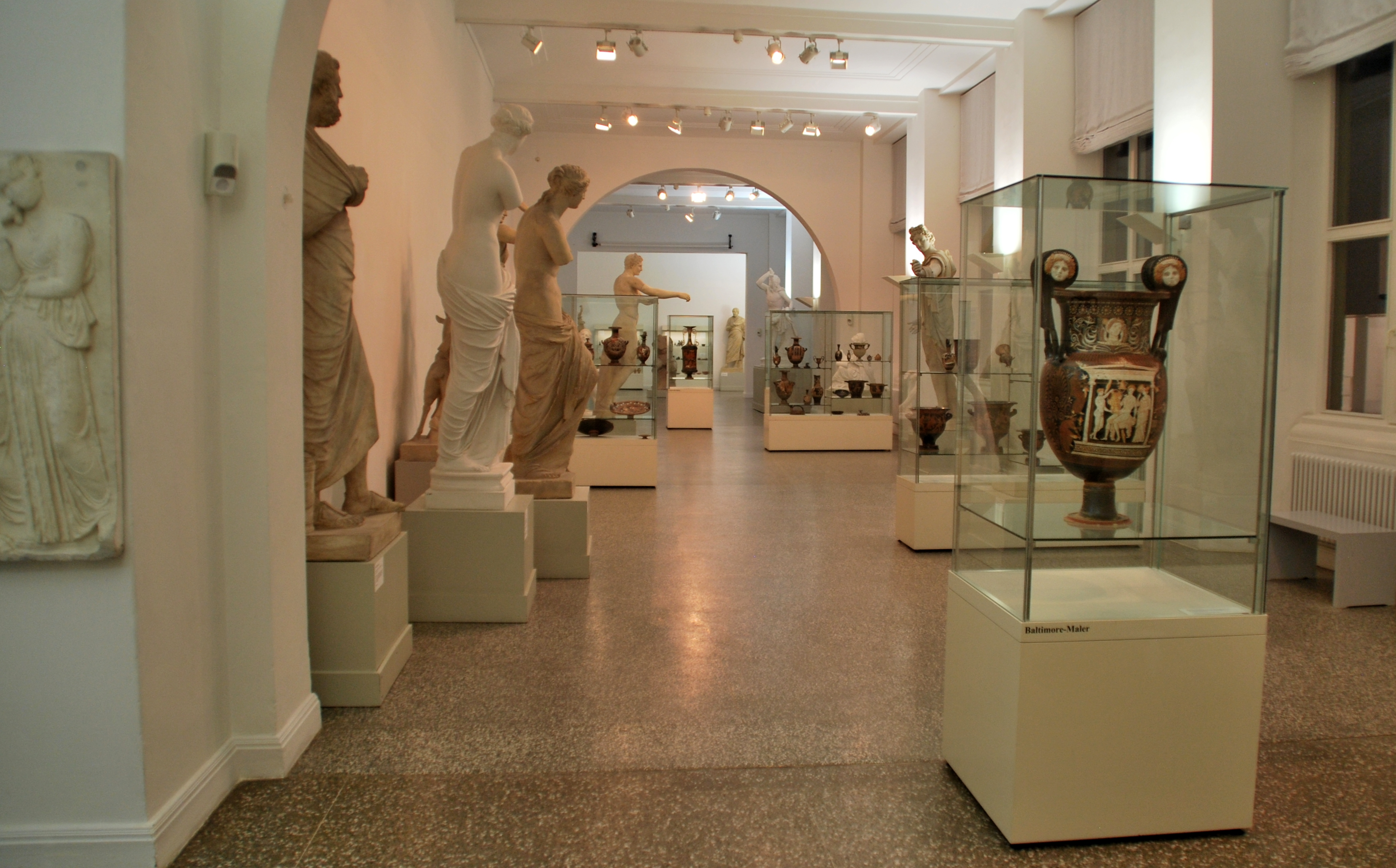

The university founded the collection in the first half of the 19th century, thanks to Peter Wilhelm Forchhammer, its first archaeology lecturer, supported by Otto Jahn. In 1840 he began raising funds for a museum of local and classical archaeology which he hoped would bring about an artistic revival in northern Germany and the following year he was given the first objects for the collection, even before the building was begun. These donations were casts of the sculptures from the Parthenon and arrived in Kiel in 1842. Kiel was then part of Denmark and Christian VIII of Denmark granted the university the main space in the chapel of Kiel Castle to turn into a cast gallery - that chapel had been destroyed by fire in 1838. It opened there on 18 January 1843. After that of the University of Bonn, it was the second archaeological collection set up in Germany or Austria and the first public art museum in northern Germany.

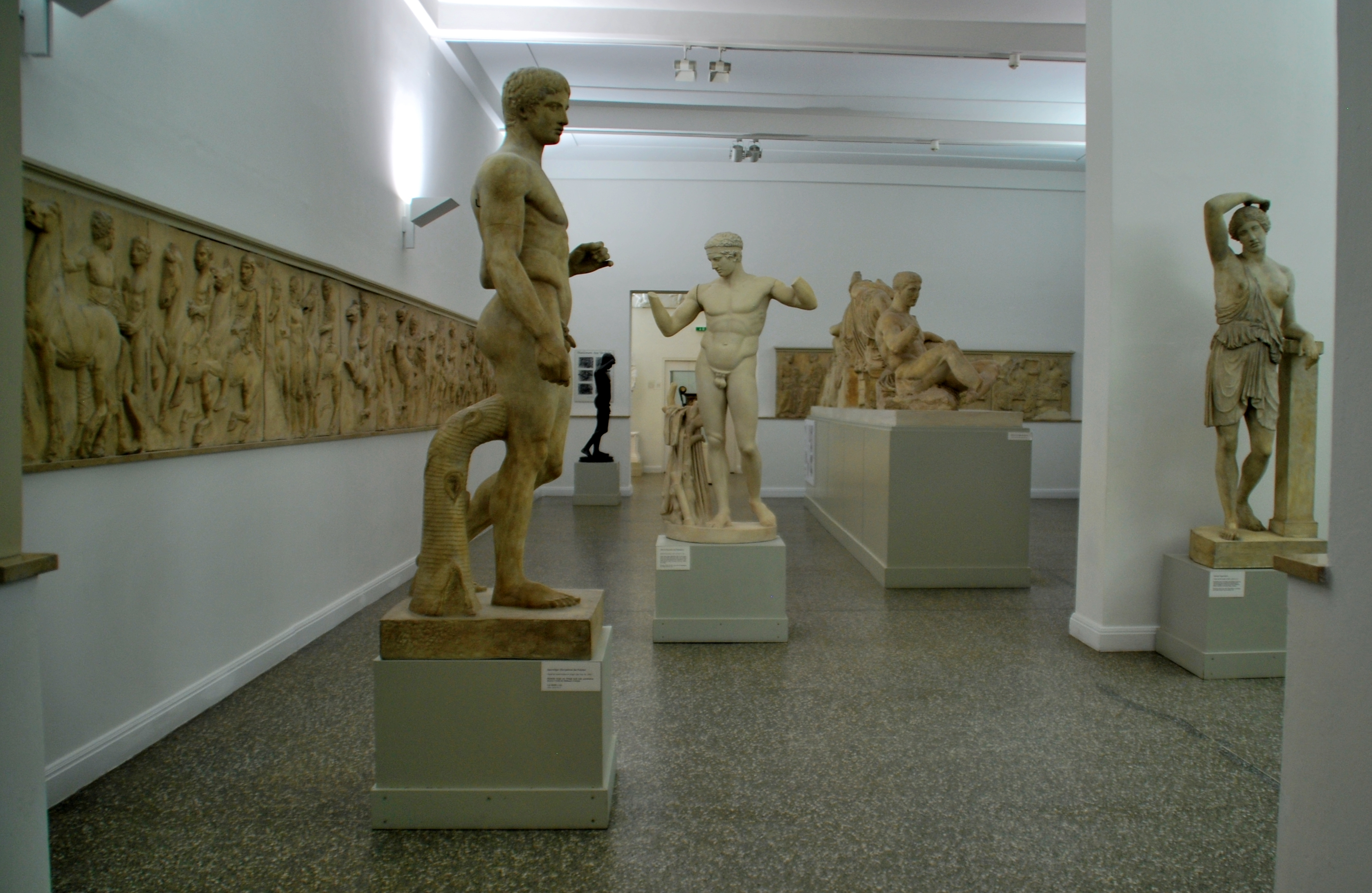

== Directors ==
The post of director is traditionally held by the head of the university's Classical Archaeology Department.

- 1842–1894: Peter Wilhelm Forchhammer
- 1895–1903: Arthur Milchhoefer
- 1904–1907: Ferdinand Noack
- 1909–1919: Bruno Sauer
- 1920–1925: August Frickenhaus
- 1925–1946: Eduard Schmidt
- 1946–1947: Roland Hampe
- 1948–1968: Wilhelm Kraiker
- 1968–1990: Konrad Schauenburg
- 1990–2006: Bernhard Schmaltz
- 2007–2010: Frank Rumscheid
- 2012–present: Annette Haug

== Curators ==
- 1985-2017: Joachim Raeder
- 2017–2023: Manuel Flecker
- since 2023: Benjamin Engels
