= Kunsthalle Kiel =

Art museum in the German city of Kiel

Coordinates: 54.3286°N 10.1460°E

The Kunsthalle zu Kiel is an art museum in the German city of Kiel. With 2,000 square metres (22,000 sq ft) of display space, it is the largest museum in the city. It is north of the city centre on Düsternbrooker Weg. It has a lecture hall, a small café and a sculpture garden.

== Building ==
The institution was founded in 1903 by Lotte Hegewisch of Christian-Albrechts-Universität zu Kiel to house an art gallery. Designed by Georg Lohr, the building was constructed between 1908 and 1909, opening on 14 November 1909 by Carl Neumann, chairman of the Schleswig-Holsteinischer Kunstverein, founded in 1843. It has a shell limestone facade in the Neo-Baroque and Jugendstil styles. In front of the entrance are two bison sculptures by August Gaul.

In the 1950s a new staircase was added, followed by an extension in 1986. In 2012 a re-design of the entrance hall was completed.

== Collections ==
The museum houses the Schleswig-Holsteinischen Kunstverein's collection, including objets d'art, photographs, video art, sculptures and paintings. Topics covered include 19th century Romanticism, the Russian 'Wandermaler' painters, German Expressionism, German Impressionism and international art since 1945. The building also houses the Antikensammlung Kiel, founded in 1895 and consisting of ancient sculptures and a collection of casts of classical sculptures, the latter having been founded in 1838. The Antikensammlung is attached to the university. Much of the original collection was destroyed in World War Two air raids.

== Provenance research ==
In July 2018 the Kunsthalle zu Kiel published a provenance research dossier on 85 paintings and 9 sculptures.

== Gallery ==
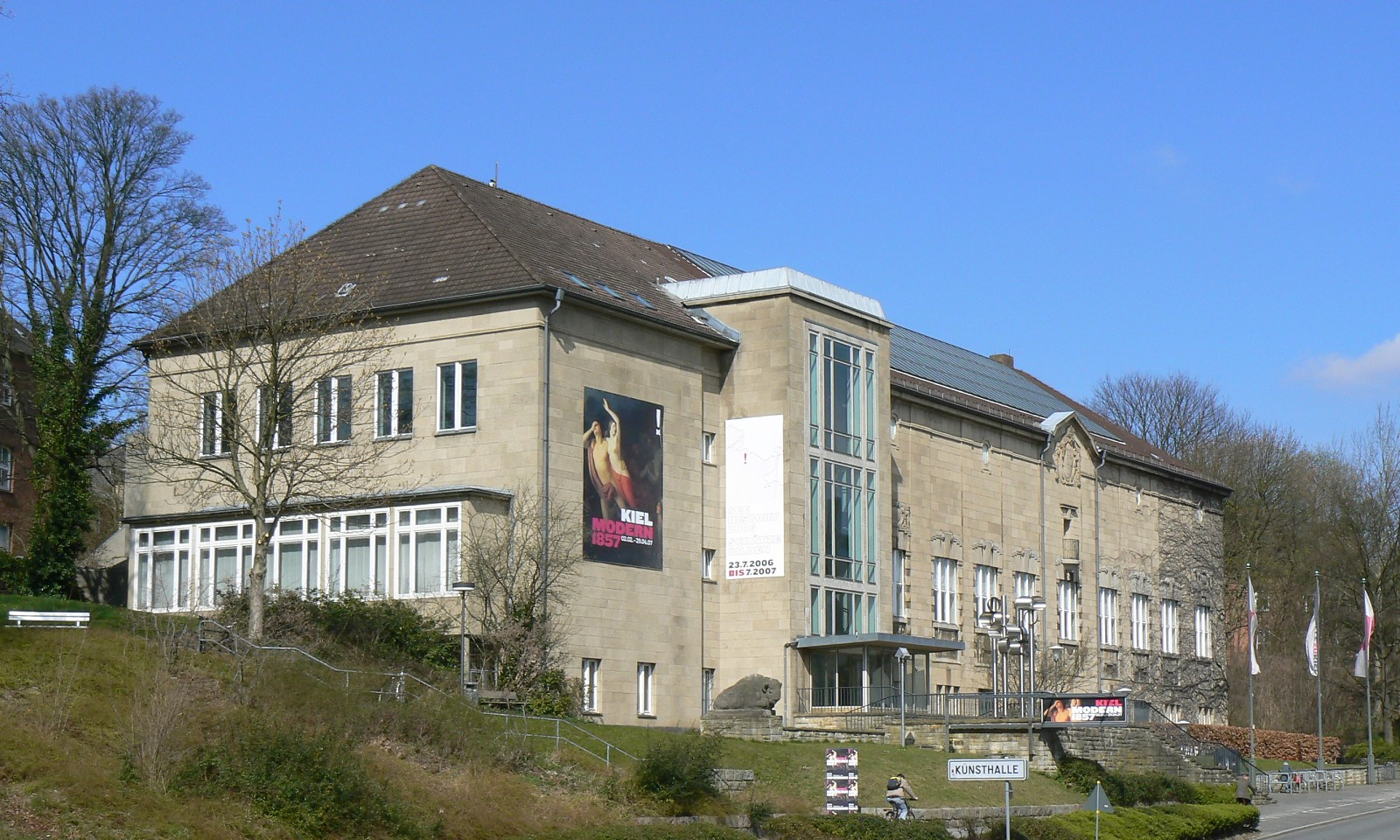
Kunsthalle Kiel 2007

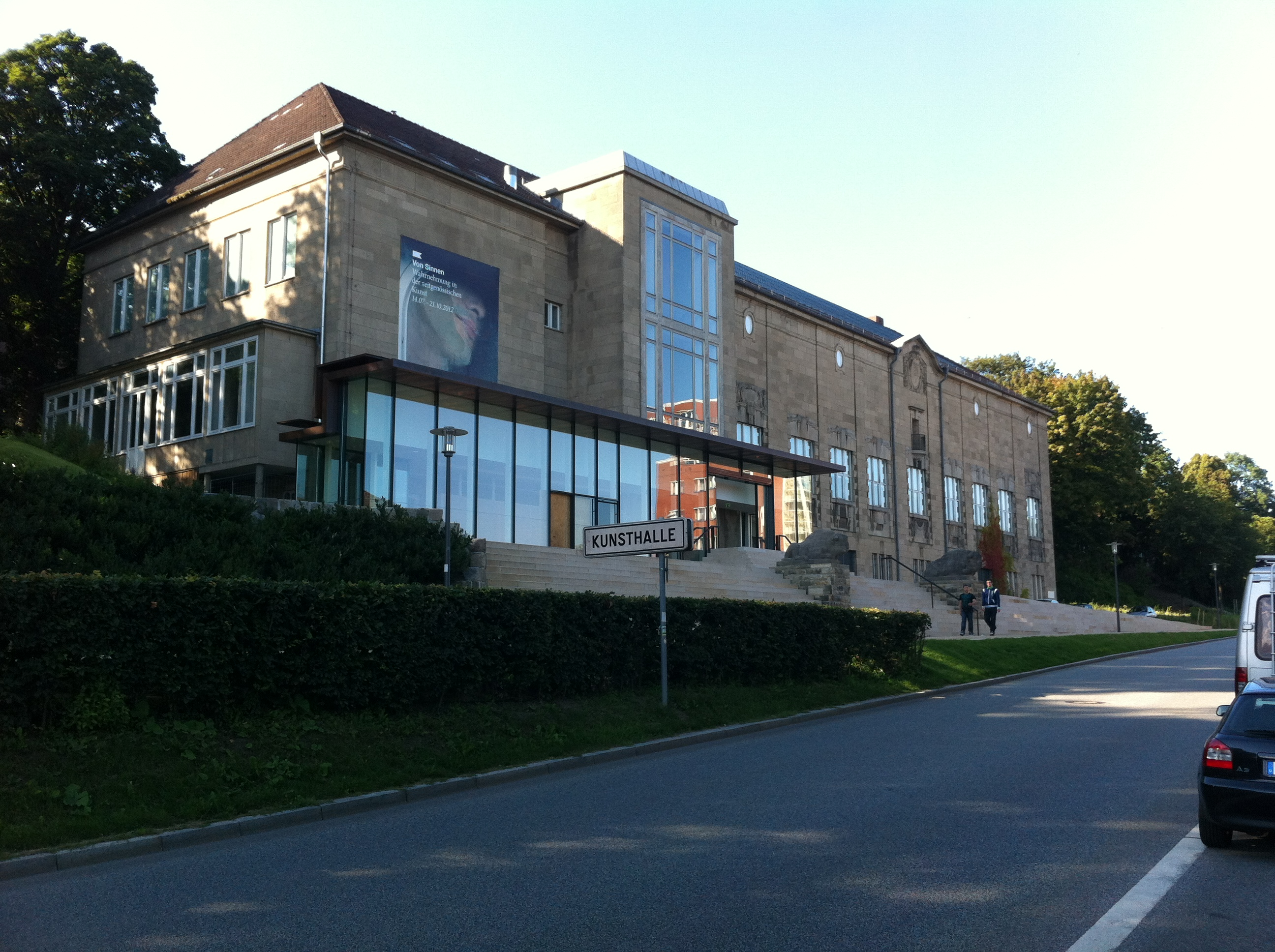
Kunsthalle Kiel 2012 (new entrance hall)

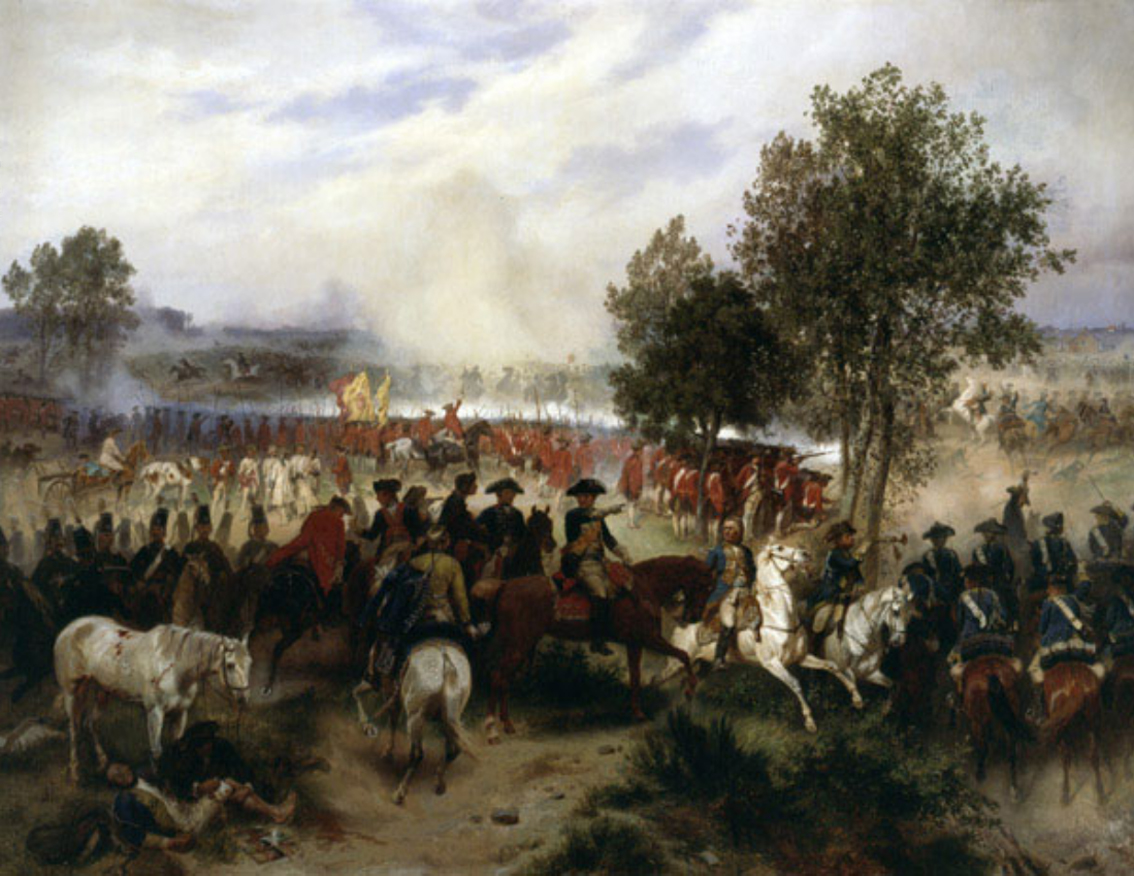
Battle of Krefeld by Emil Hünten

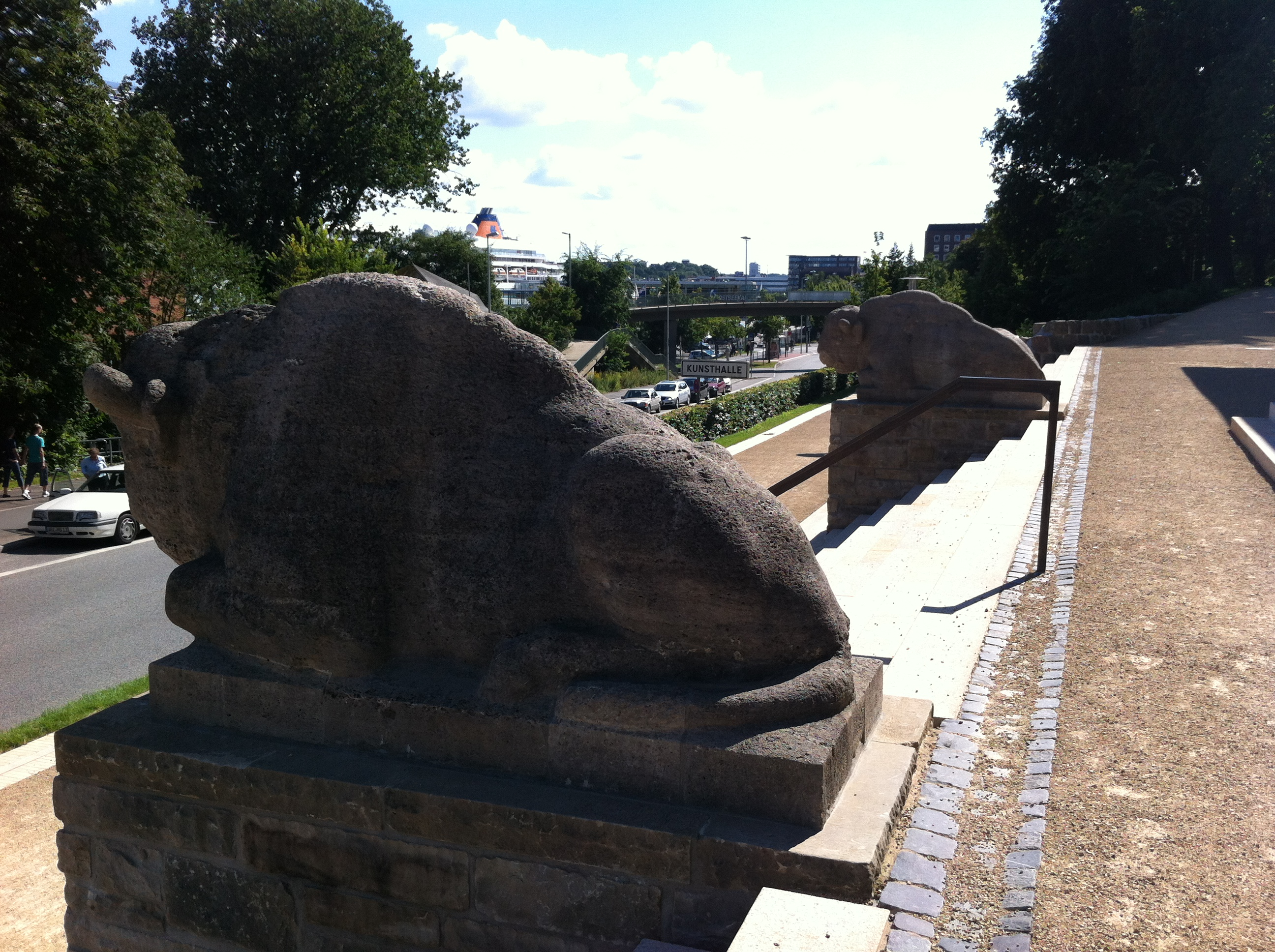
Bison sculptures by August Gaul on the outer stairs

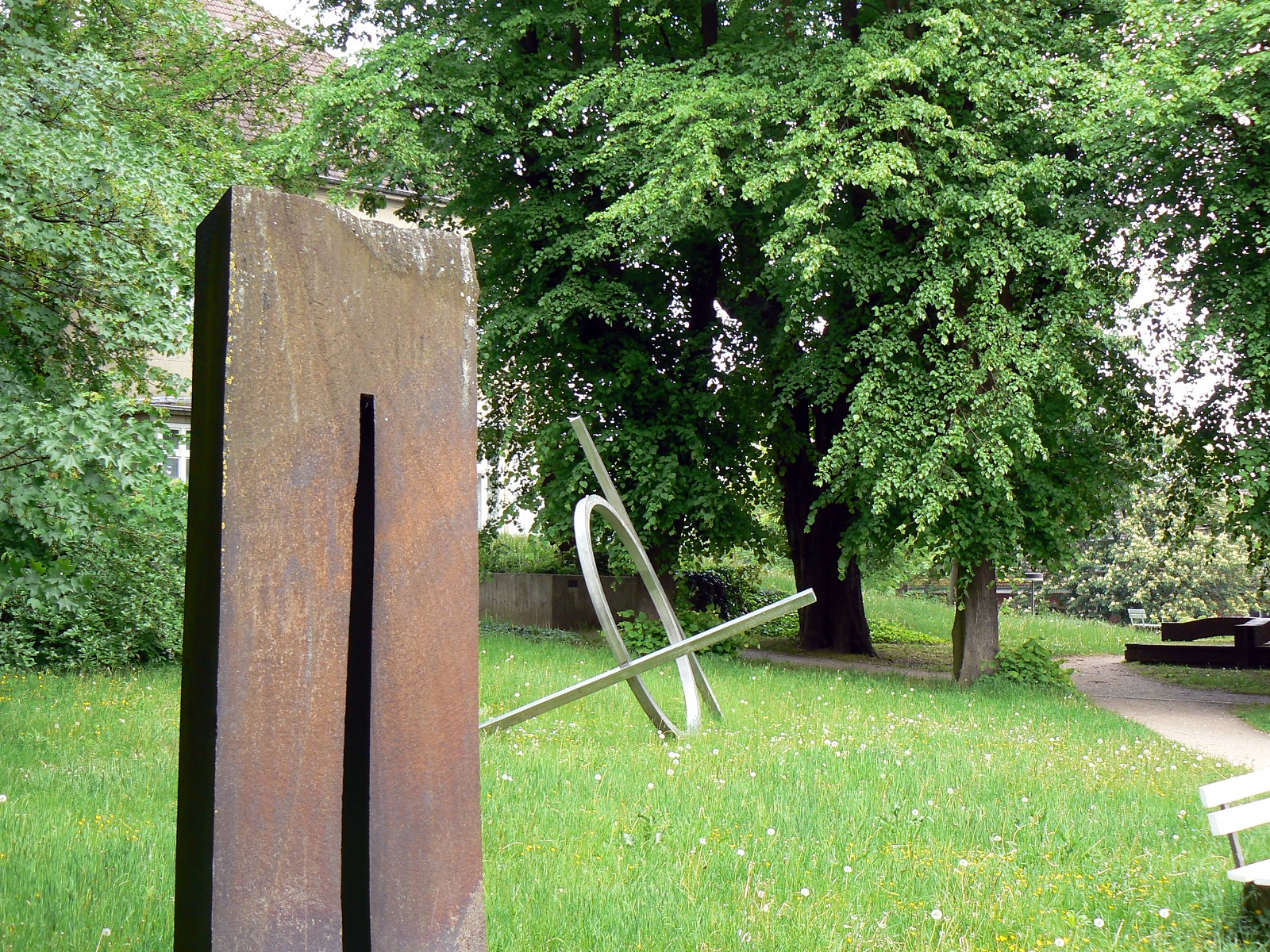
Sculpture garden

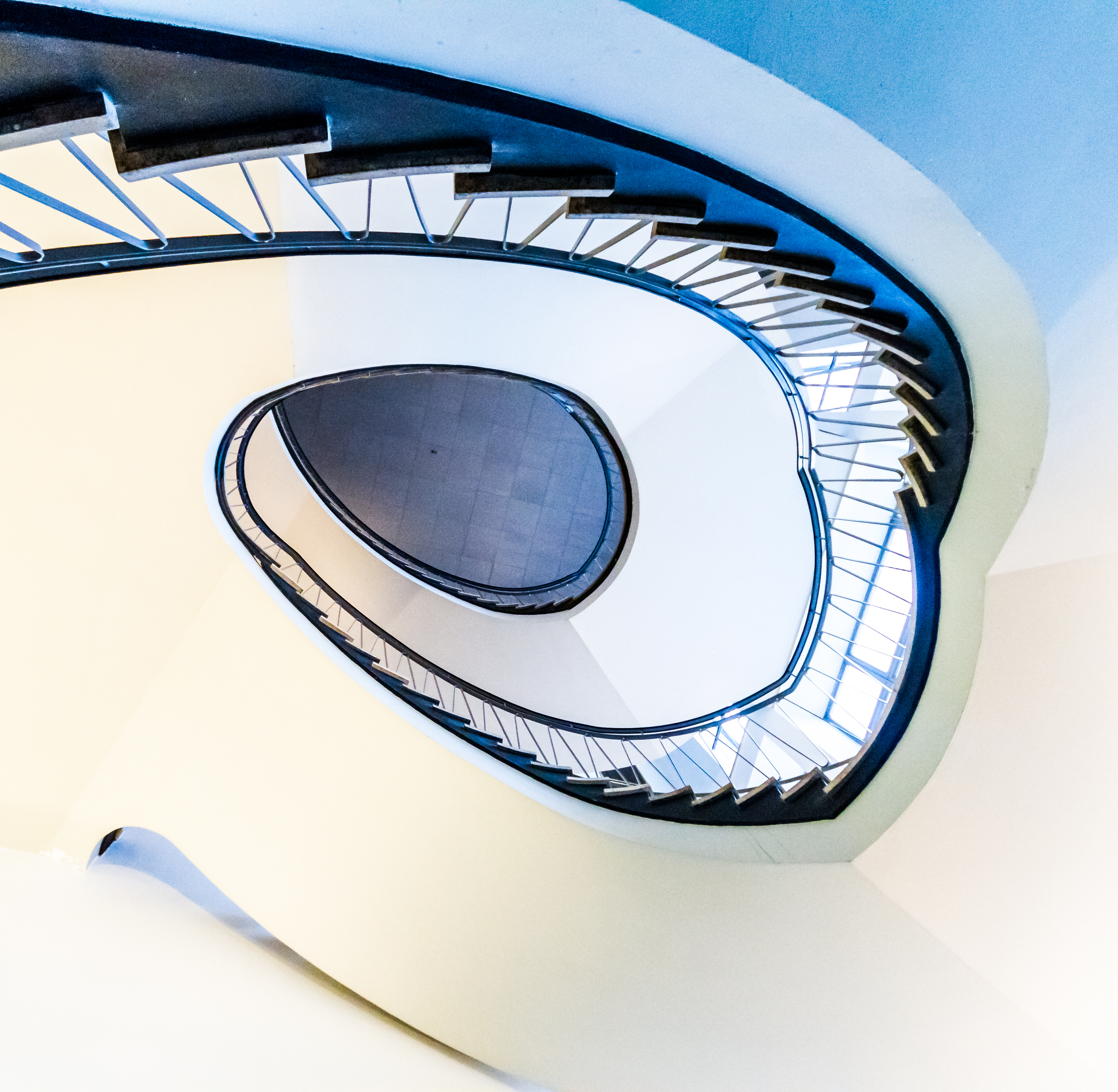
Treppenhaus from below

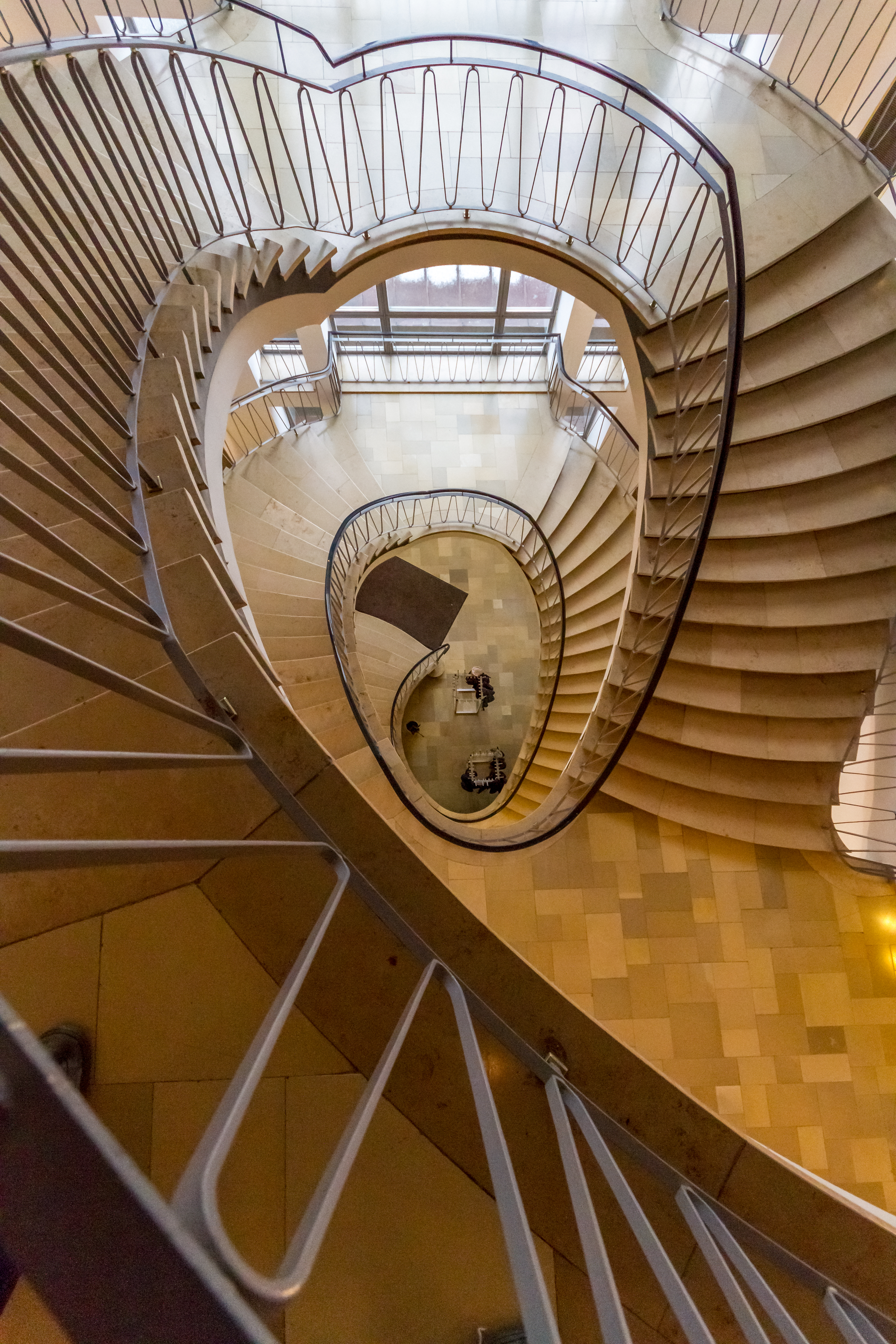
Treppenhaus from above

== List of directors ==
- 1971–1990: Jens Christian Jensen
- 1992–2000: Hans-Werner Schmidt
- 2002–2009: Dirk Luckow
- 2010–present: Anette Hüsch

== Bibliography ==
- Dirk Luckow (ed.) Kunsthalle zu Kiel. DuMont, Köln 2007, ISBN 978-3-8321-9011-8 (in German)
- Hans Tintelnot: Die Kunsthalle zu Kiel. Zur Geschichte eines Museumsbaus. Nordelbingen 1960 (in German)
- Jens Christian Jensen (ed.) 100 Jahre Kieler Woche - Lyonel Feininger: Gemälde, Aquarelle und Zeichnungen, Druckgraphik. Verlag: Kunsthalle zu Kiel der Christian-Albrechts-Universität, Kiel 1982 (in German)
