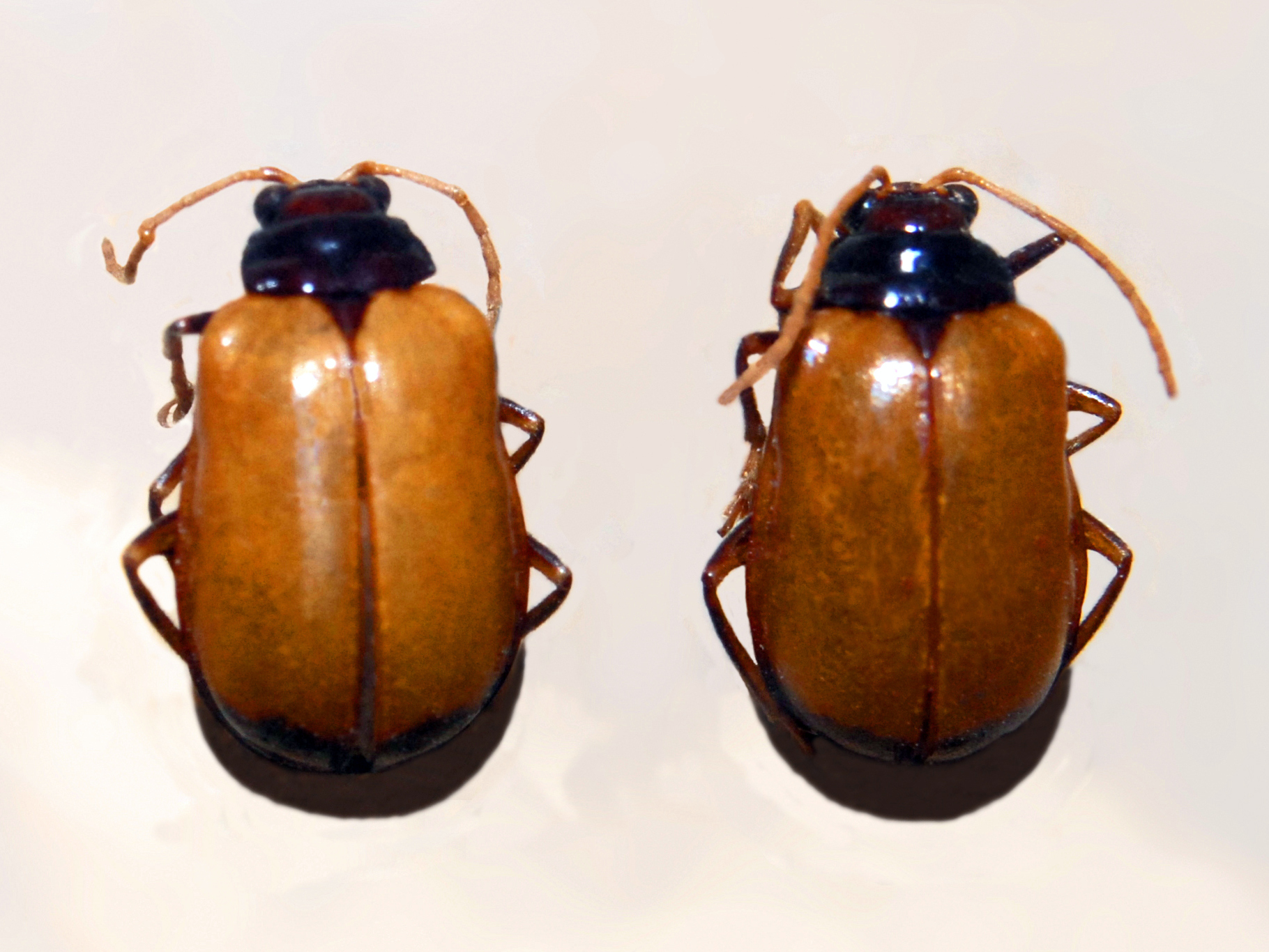
- Aplosonyx nigricollis from Nias. Mounted specimen

Scientific classification
- Kingdom: Animalia
- Phylum: Arthropoda
- Clade: Pancrustacea
- Class: Insecta
- Order: Coleoptera
- Suborder: Polyphaga
- Infraorder: Cucujiformia
- Family: Chrysomelidae
- Tribe: Hylaspini
- Genus: Aplosonyx; Chevrolat, 1836

Synonyms
- Berecyntha Baly, 1865 (non Gistel, 1834 nomen oblitum); Caritheca Baly, 1877; Haplonyx Agassiz, 1846 (nec Haplonyx C.J.Schoenherr, 1836)

= Aplosonyx =

Genus of beetles

Aplosonyx is a genus of beetle belonging to the family Chrysomelidae.

== Selected species ==
- Aplosonyx albicornis (Wiedemann, 1821)
- Aplosonyx ancora Laboissiere, 1934
- Aplosonyx apicalis (Weise, 1922)
- Aplosonyx apicicornis (Jacoby, 1886)
- Aplosonyx banksi (Weise, 1913)
- Aplosonyx basalis (Jacoby, 1896)
- Aplosonyx batuensis (Jacoby, 1897)
- Aplosonyx chalybeus (Hope, 1831)
- Aplosonyx collaris (Duvivier, 1885)
- Aplosonyx duvivieri (Jacoby, 1900)
- Aplosonyx fraternus (Duvivier, 1891)
- Aplosonyx frenbi (Bowditch, 1925)
- Aplosonyx fulvicornis (Weise, 1913)
- Aplosonyx fulvoplagiatus (Jacoby, 1897)
- Aplosonyx humeralis (Bowditch, 1925)
- Aplosonyx indicus (Jacoby, 1896)
- Aplosonyx inornatus (Jacoby, 1892)
- Aplosonyx kinabaluensis Mohamedsaid, 1999
- Aplosonyx lituratus (Weise, 1922)
- Aplosonyx monticola (Bowditch, 1925)
- Aplosonyx mouhoti (Baly, 1879)
- Aplosonyx nigriceps Yang, 1995
- Aplosonyx nigricollis (Duvivier, 1885)
- Aplosonyx nigripennis (Jacoby, 1884)
- Aplosonyx orientalis (Jacoby, 1892)
- Aplosonyx ornatus (Jacoby, 1892)
- Aplosonyx ornatipennis (Jacoby, 1896)
- Aplosonyx pahangi Mohamedsaid, 1990
- Aplosonyx parvulus (Jacoby, 1886)
- Aplosonyx philippinensis (Jacoby, 1891)
- Aplosonyx pictus (Chen, 1939)
- Aplosonyx quadriplagiatus (Baly, 1886)
- Aplosonyx quadripustulatus (Baly, 1877)
- Aplosonyx robinsoni (Jacoby, 1905)
- Aplosonyx rufipennis (Duvivier, 1892)
- Aplosonyx scutellatus (Baly, 1879)
- Aplosonyx semiflavus (Wiedemann, 1819)
- Aplosonyx shelfordi (Jacoby, 1905)
- Aplosonyx smaragdipennis (Chevrolat, 1838)
- Aplosonyx speciosus (Baly, 1879)
- Aplosonyx spenceri Kimoto, 1989
- Aplosonyx sublaevicollis (Jacoby, 1889)
- Aplosonyx sumatrae (Weber, 1801)
- Aplosonyx sumatrensis (Jacoby, 1884)
- Aplosonyx tianpingshanensis Yang, 1995
- Aplosonyx tibialis (Baly, 1865)
- Aplosonyx varipes (Jacoby, 1892)
- Aplosonyx wallacei (Jacoby, 1894)
- Aplosonyx yunlongensis Jiang, 1992
