= Zoological Museum of Kiel University =

Museum in Kiel, Germany

Coordinates: 54°19′41″N 10°08′39″E

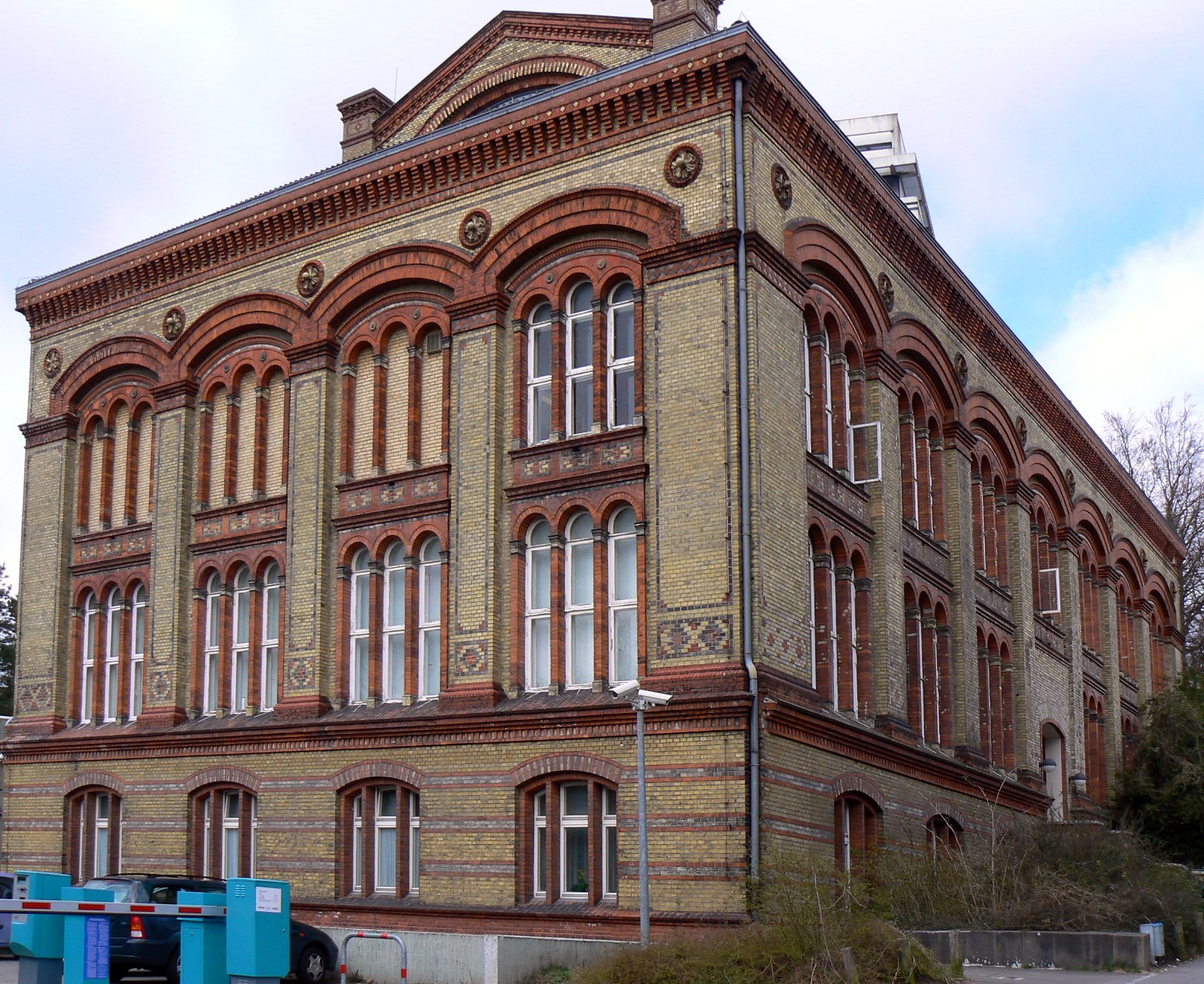
Zoological Museum of Kiel University

Zoological Museum of Kiel University, Schleswig-Holstein

The Zoological Museum of Kiel University is a zoological museum in Kiel, Germany. It was founded by naturalist Karl Möbius, and architect Martin Gropius designed the building. The exhibitions display systematics, evolution, tropical and German fauna, butterfly ecology and history of zoology in Kiel. The museum is part of Kiel University and participates in the Museen am Meer association.

== History ==
Collections include specimens of Johann Daniel Major, Johan Christian Fabricius, and Christian Rudolph Wilhelm Wiedemann and from marine zoology expeditions: Galathea expedition, 1845–1847; the Albatross expedition, 1876–1885; the German Plankton-Expedition, 1889; the first German deep-sea expedition, 1898–1899; and the first German southpolar expedition. 1901–1903.
