= Old Botanical Garden =

The Old Botanical Garden may refer to:

- The Alter Botanischer Garten Hamburg, in the German city of Hamburg
- The Old Botanical Garden of Göttingen University, in the German city of Göttingen
- The Old Botanical Garden, Kiel, in the German city of Kiel
- The Old Botanical Garden, Zürich, in the Swiss city of Zürich
