= Kiel =

Capital of Schleswig-Holstein, Germany

- City
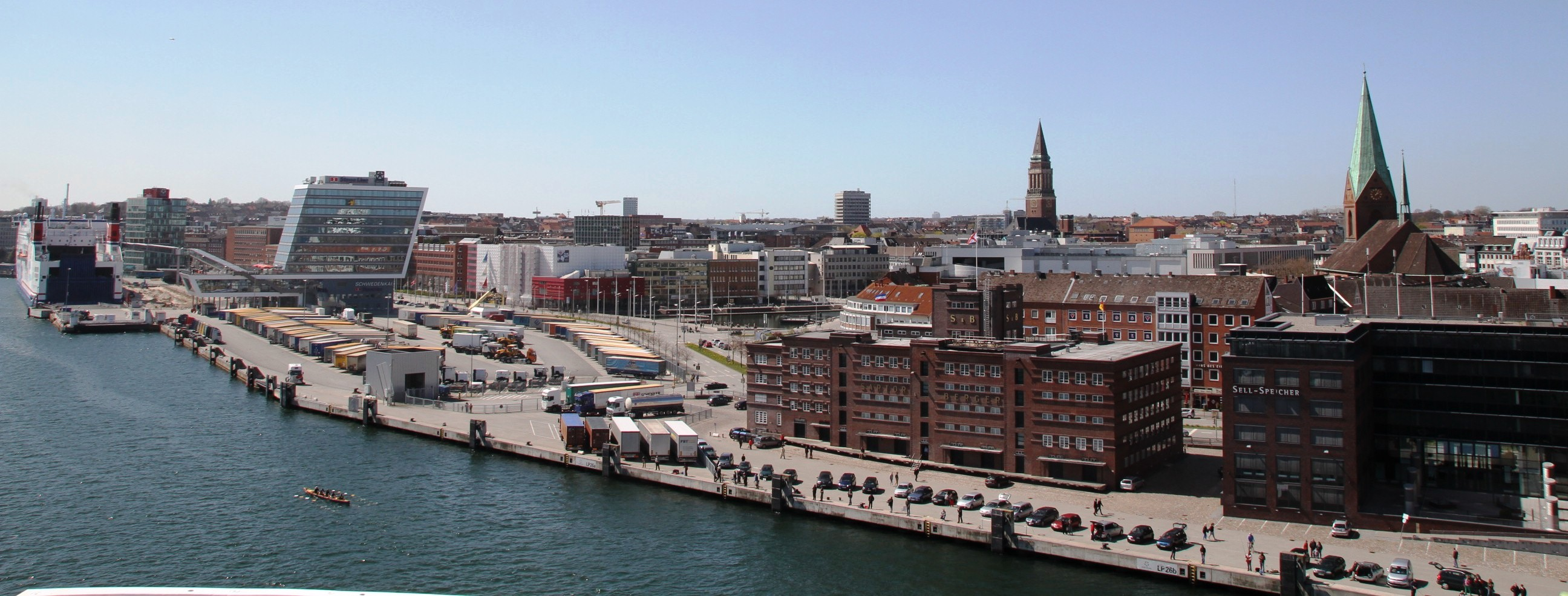
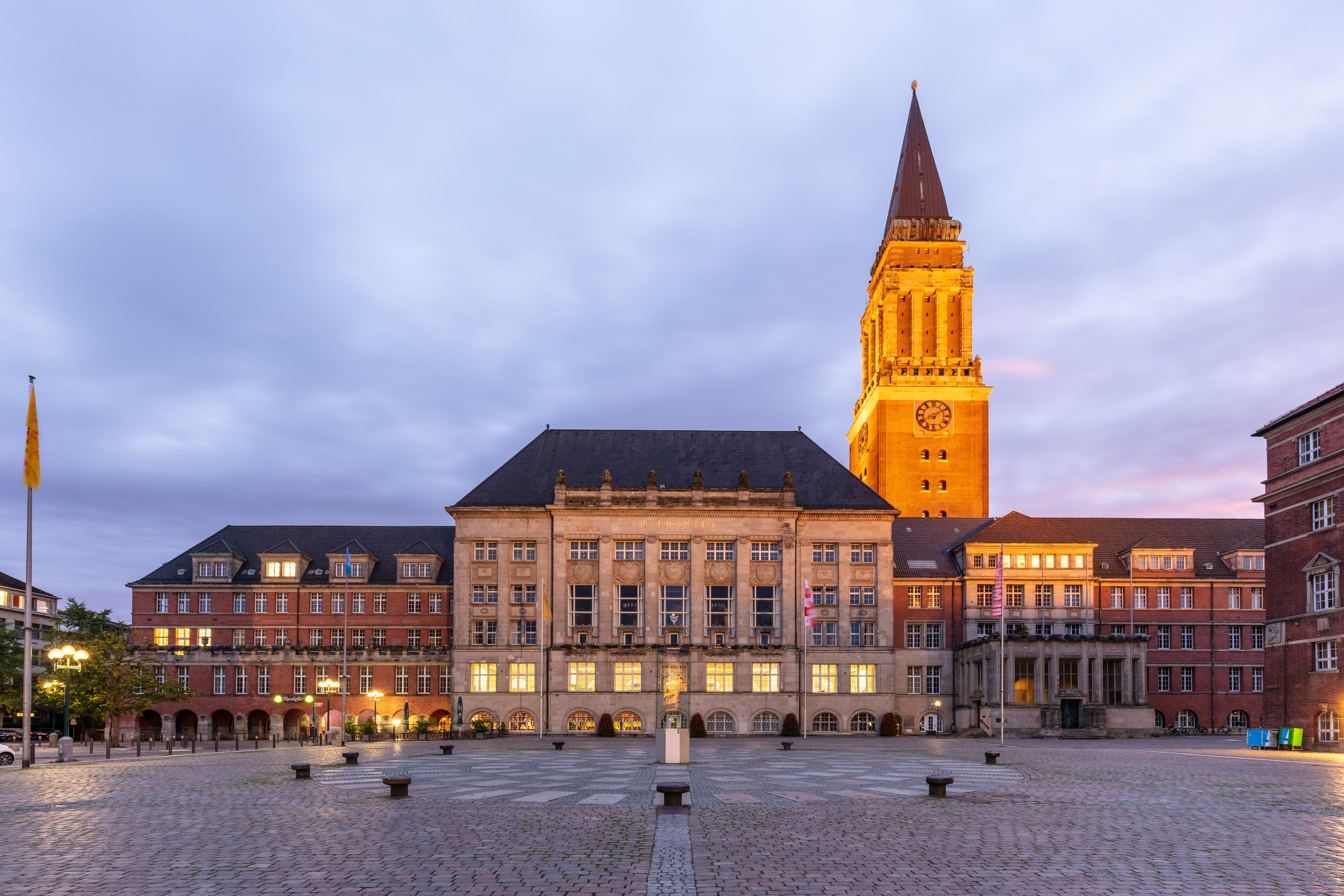
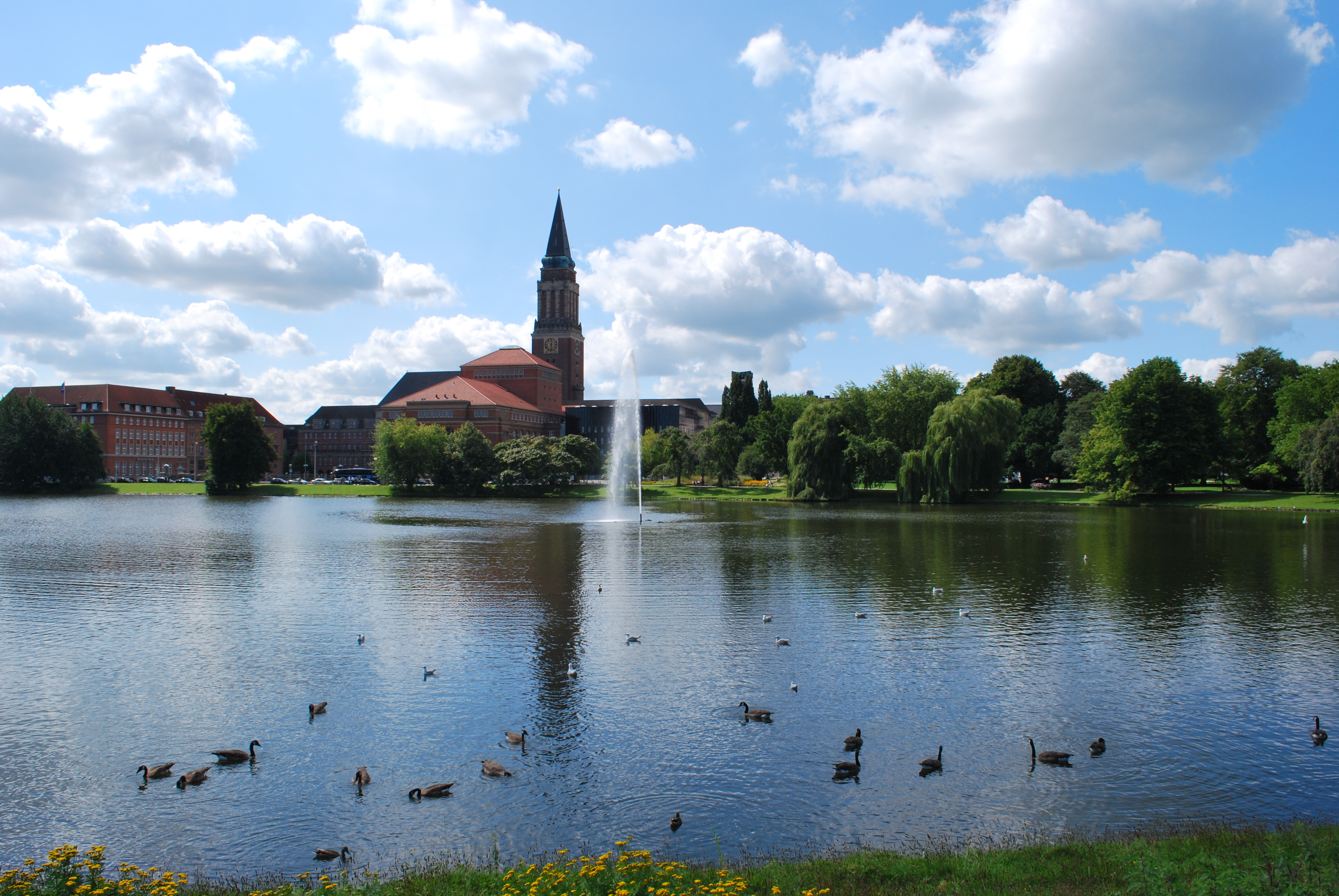
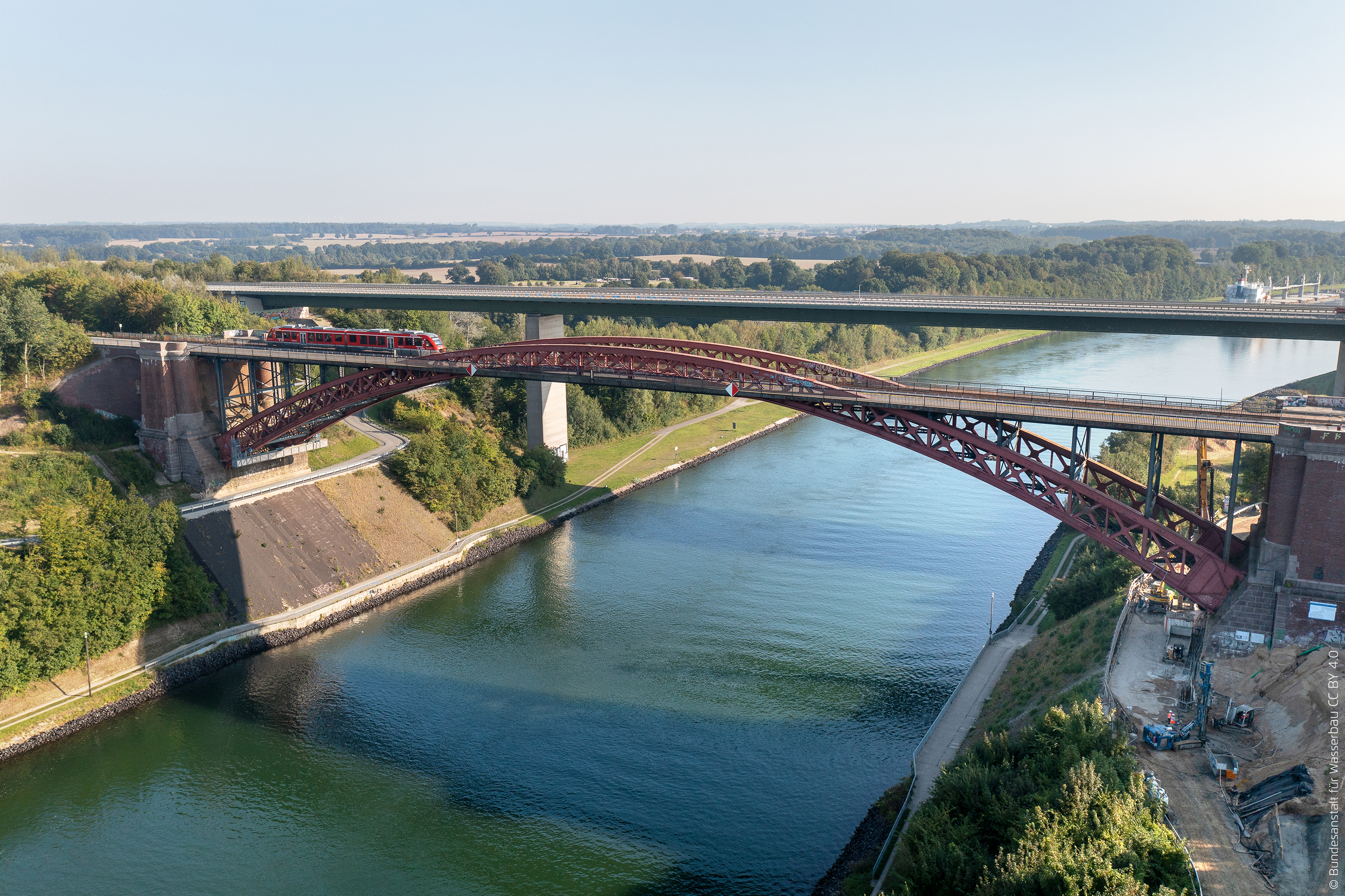
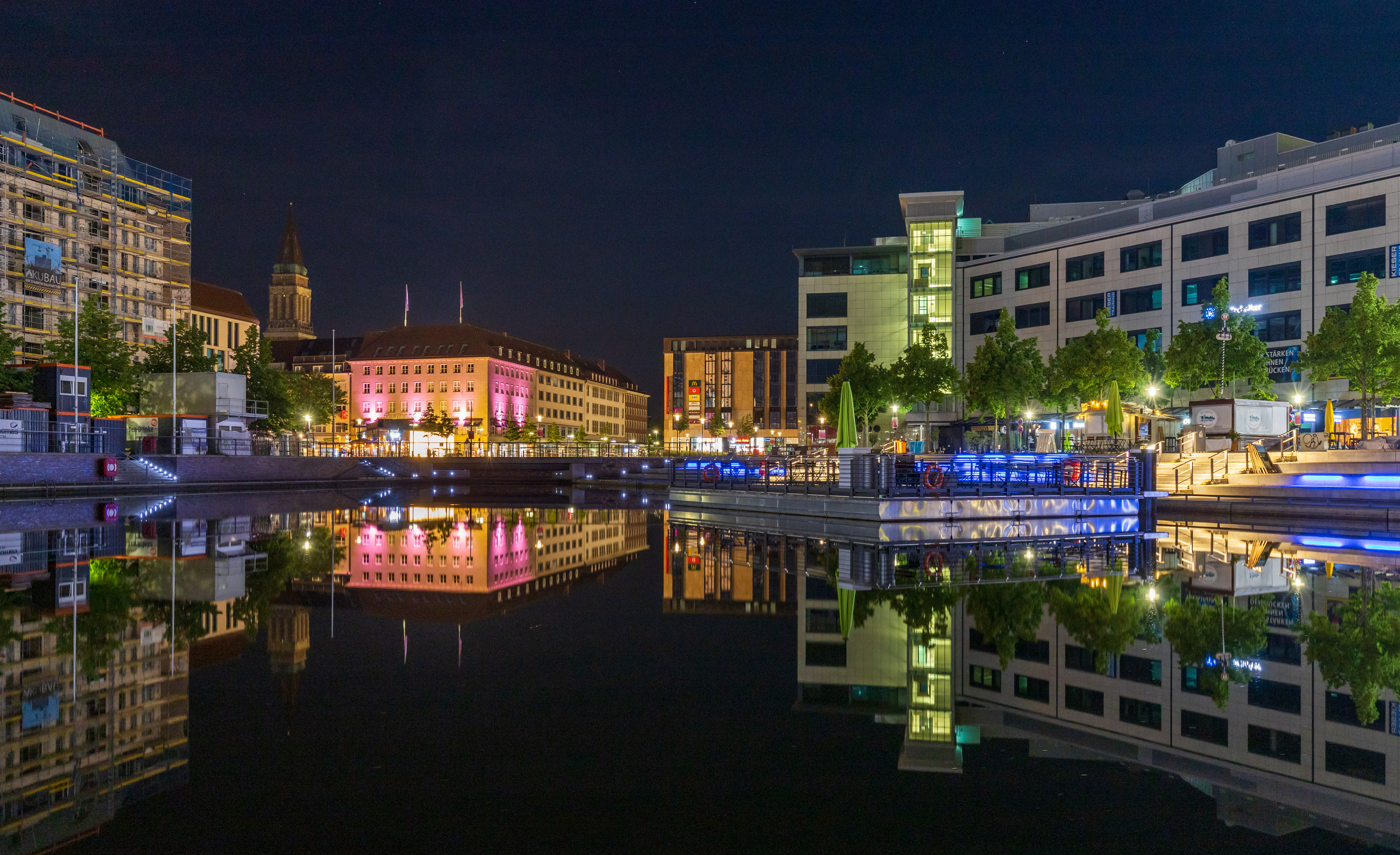
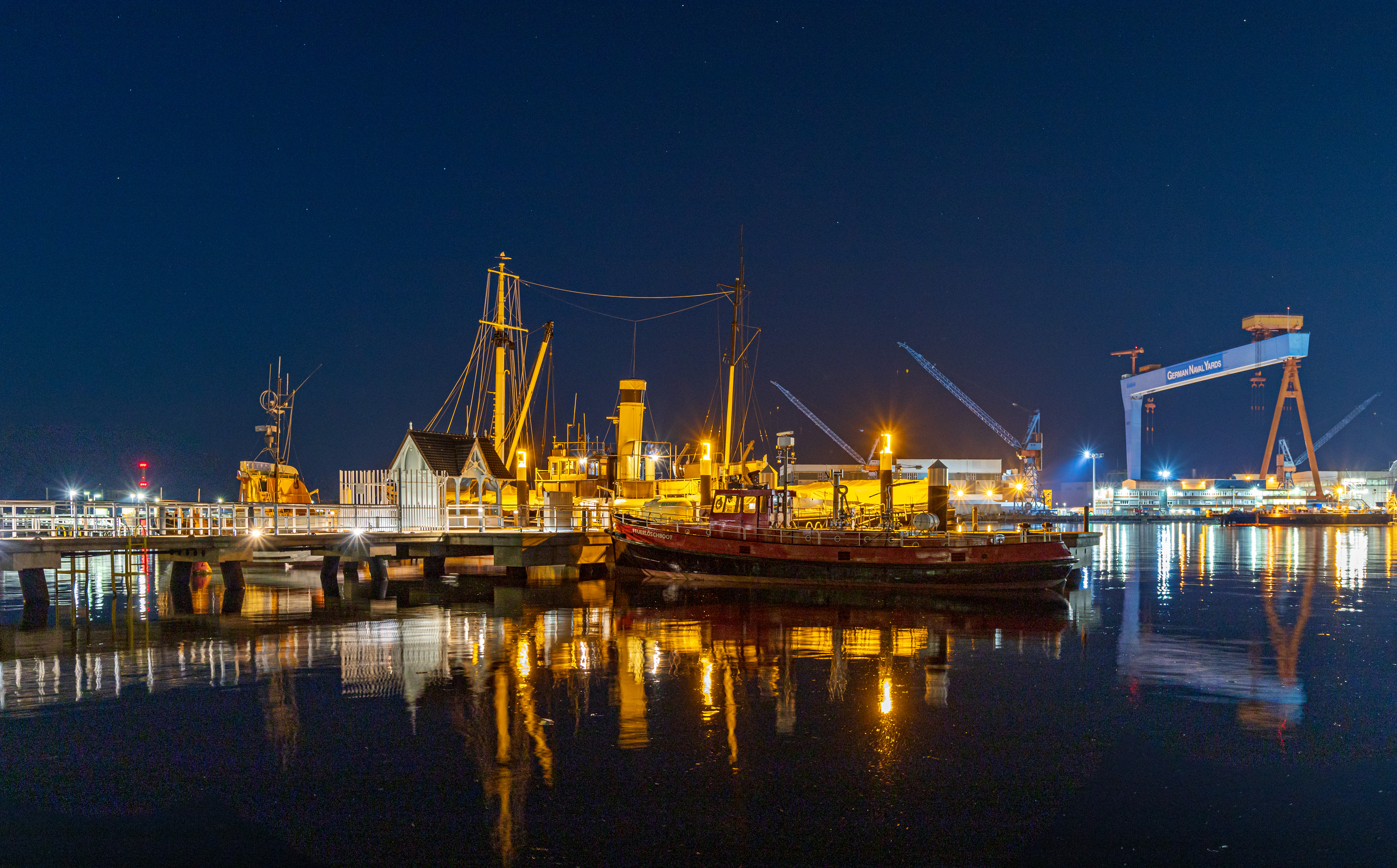
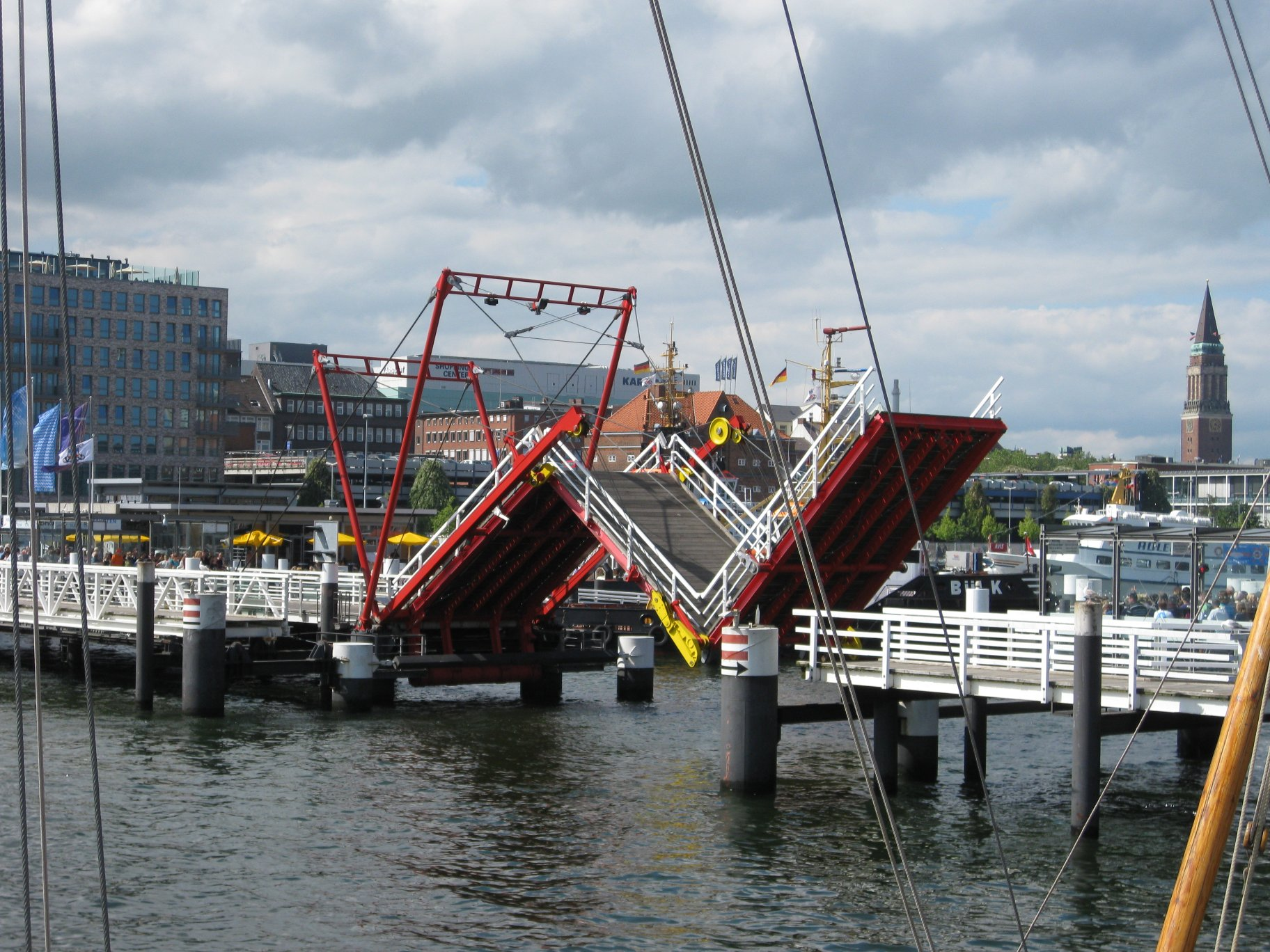
- Schwedenkai City Hall Kleiner Kiel Levensau High Bridge Bootshafen Museum Bridge Hörn Bridge

- Flag Coat of arms
- Interactive map of Kiel
- Location within Germany Location within Schleswig-Holstein
- Coordinates: 54°19′24″N 10°08′22″E
- Country: Germany
- State: Schleswig-Holstein
- District: Urban district
- Subdivisions: 18 districts

Government
  - Mayor: Samet Yılmaz
  - Governing parties: Green

Area
  - City: 118.65 km^{2} (45.81 sq mi)
- Elevation: 5 m (16 ft)

Population (2025-12-31)
  - City: 251,842
  - Density: 2,122.6/km^{2} (5,497.4/sq mi)
  - Metro: 643,594
- Time zone: UTC+01:00 (CET)
  - Summer (DST): UTC+02:00 (CEST)
- Postal codes: 24103–24159
- Dialling codes: 0431
- Vehicle registration: KI
- Website: www.kiel.de

Kiel (/kiːl/ KEEL; German: [kiːl]) is the capital and most populous city in the northern German state of Schleswig-Holstein. With a population of around 250,000, it is Germany's largest city on the Baltic Sea. It is located on the Kieler Förde inlet of the Bay of Kiel and lies in the southeast of the Jutland Peninsula, at the mouth of the Schwentine River, approximately 90 kilometres (56 mi) northeast of Hamburg. The world's busiest artificial waterway, the Kiel Canal, has a terminus in Kiel's Holtenau district. This canal connects the Baltic to the North Sea, with its other end in Brunsbüttel. Most of Kiel is part of Holstein. The boroughs north of the Schwentine also belong to Wagria, while those north of the Kiel Canal are historically part of Southern Schleswig.

Originally a small settlement, Kiel was granted city rights in 1242. Over the centuries, it developed as an important port and trading hub, particularly due to its strategic location on the Kieler Förde inlet. Kiel became part of the Duchy of Holstein, the northernmost state of the Holy Roman Empire. From 1773 to 1864, it was ruled in personal union by the king of Denmark. In 1864, after the Second Schleswig War, the city was incorporated into the Kingdom of Prussia. During the 20th century, Kiel played a significant role in both World War I and World War II, with its naval significance and shipbuilding industry. Following World War II, it became part of West Germany and later reunified Germany.

Kiel is one of Germany's major maritime centres, known for a variety of international sailing events, including the annual Kiel Week, which is the biggest sailing event in the world. Kiel is also known for the Kiel Mutiny, when sailors refused orders to prepare to engage the British Navy in the last weeks of World War I, sparking the German Revolution, which led to the abdication of the Kaiser and the formation of the Weimar Republic. The Olympic sailing competitions at the 1936 and 1972 Summer Olympics were held in the Bay of Kiel.

Kiel has also been one of the traditional homes of the German Navy's Baltic fleet, and continues to be a major high-tech shipbuilding centre. Kiel University, founded in 1665, is home to the GEOMAR – Helmholtz Centre for Ocean Research Kiel. Kiel is an important sea transport hub, with passenger ferries to Sweden, Norway, Lithuania and other countries. Moreover, today the Port of Kiel is a popular destination for cruise ships touring the Baltic Sea.

== History ==
=== Middle Ages ===
The city of Kiel was founded in 1233 as Holstenstadt tom Kyle by Count Adolf IV of Holstein, and granted Lübeck city rights in 1242 by Adolf's eldest son, John I of Schauenburg. As a part of Holstein, Kiel belonged to the Holy Roman Empire and was situated only a few kilometres south of the Danish border.

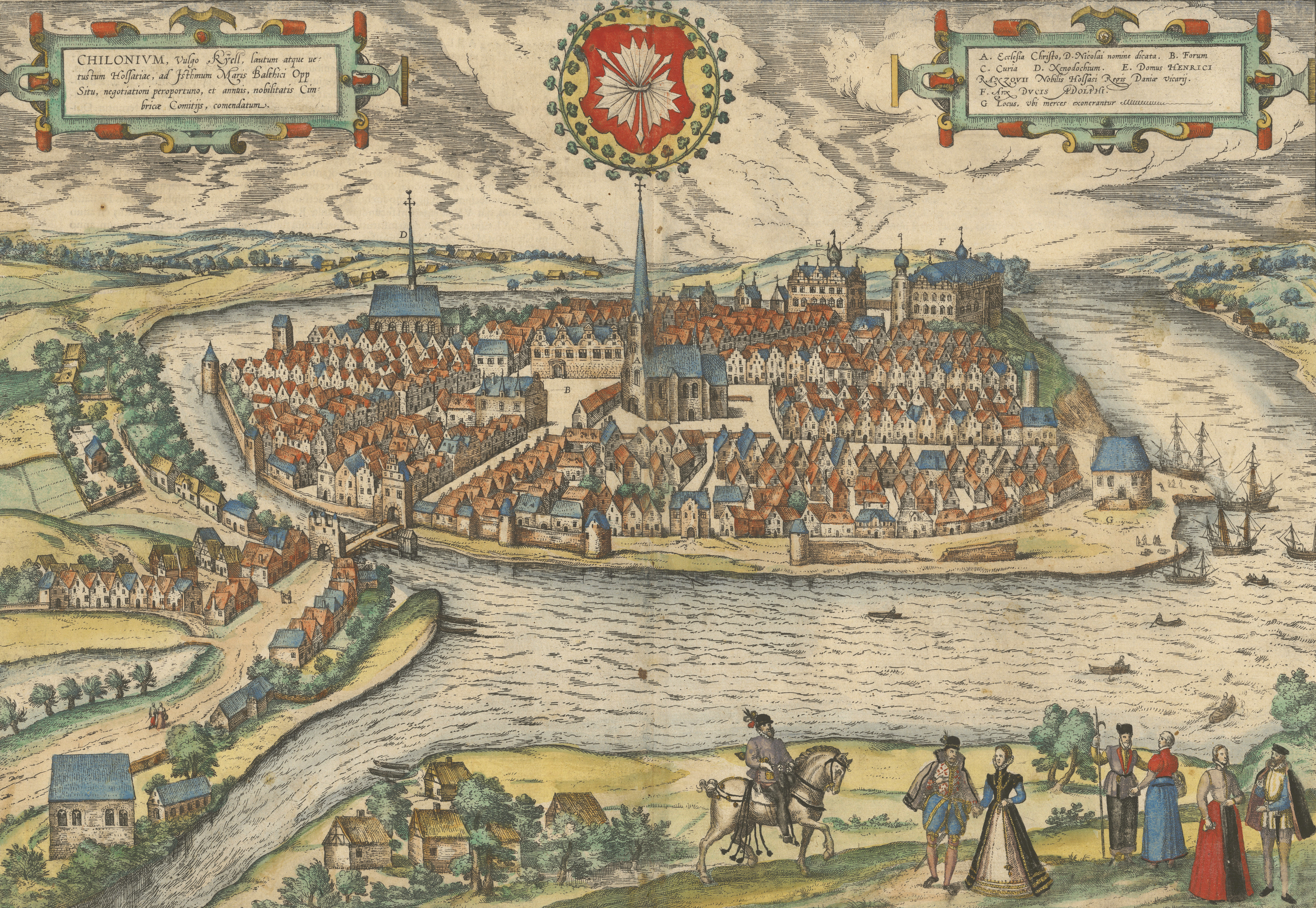
Kiel in the 16th century

The capital of the county (later duchy) of Holstein, Kiel was a member of the Hanseatic League from 1284 until it was expelled in 1518 for harbouring pirates. The Kieler Umschlag (trade fair), first held in 1431, became the central market for goods and money in the Duchy of Holstein. It began to decline c. 1850 and ceased in 1900.

=== Modern times ===
Kiel University was founded on 29 September 1665 by Christian Albert, Duke of Holstein-Gottorp. A number of important scholars, including Theodor Mommsen, Felix Jacoby, Hans Geiger and Max Planck, studied or taught there.

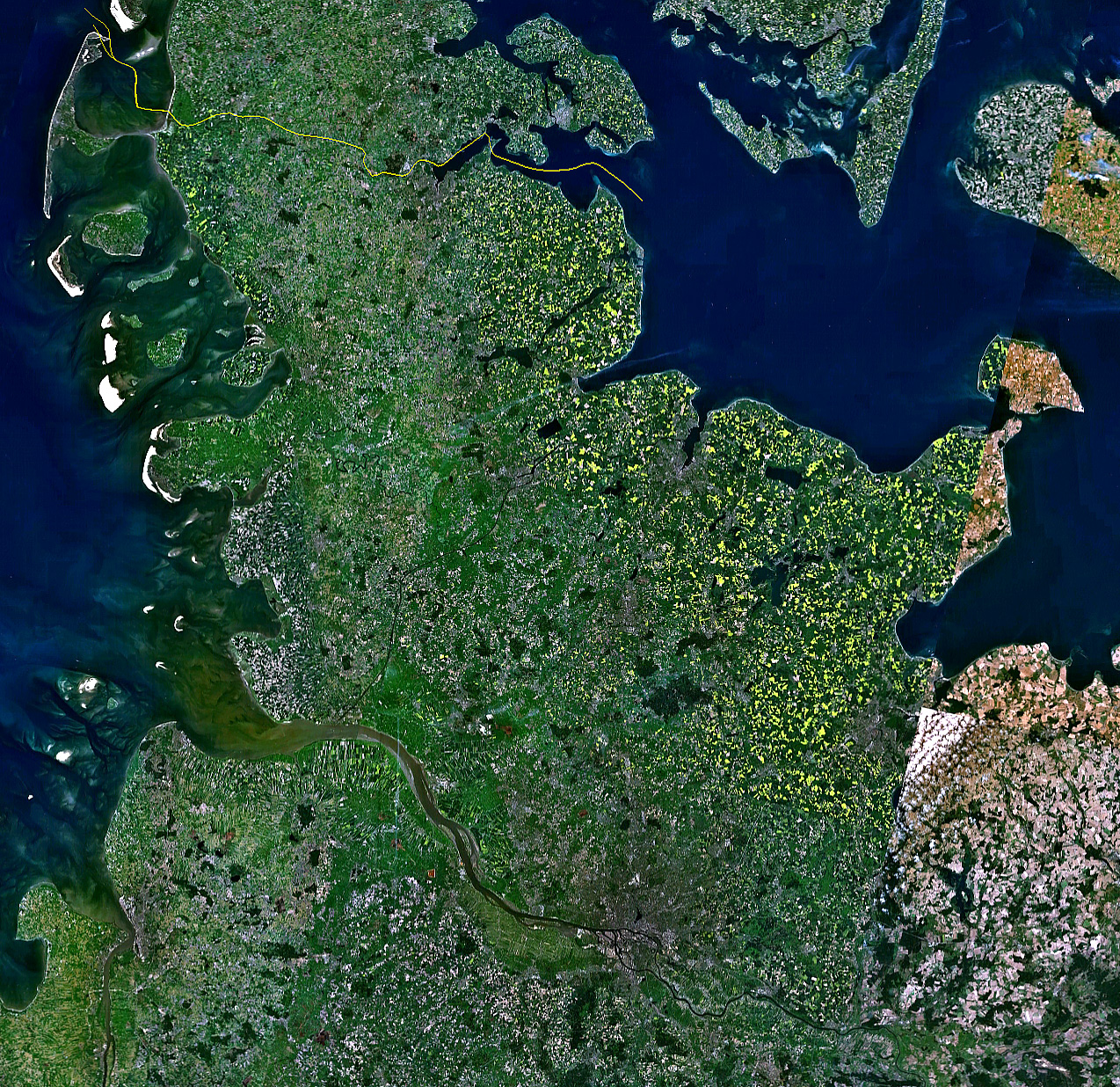
Schleswig-Holstein with Kiel Fjord at the Baltic Coast

From 1773 to 1864, the town belonged to the king of Denmark. However, because the king ruled Holstein as a fief of the Holy Roman Empire only through a personal union, the town was not incorporated as part of Denmark proper. Even though the empire was abolished in 1806, the Danish king continued to rule Kiel only through his position as Duke of Holstein, which became a member of the German Confederation in 1815. When Schleswig and Holstein rebelled against Denmark in 1848 (the First Schleswig War), Kiel became the capital of Schleswig-Holstein until the Danish victory in 1850.

During the Second Schleswig War in 1864, Kiel and the rest of the duchies of Schleswig and Holstein were conquered by a German Confederation alliance of the Austrian Empire and the Kingdom of Prussia. After the war, Kiel was briefly administered by both the Austrians and the Prussians, but the Austro-Prussian War in 1866 led to the formation of the Province of Schleswig-Holstein and the annexation of Kiel by Prussia in 1867. On 24 March 1865, King William I based Prussia's Baltic Sea fleet in Kiel instead of Danzig (Gdańsk). The Imperial shipyard Kiel was established in 1867 in the town.

When William I of Prussia became Emperor William I of the German Empire in 1871, he designated Kiel and Wilhelmshaven as Reichskriegshäfen ("Imperial War Harbours"). The Kiel Yacht Club was established in 1887 with Prince Henry of Prussia as its patron. Emperor Wilhelm II became its commodore in 1891.

Because of its new role as Germany's main naval base, Kiel very quickly increased in size in the following years, from 18,770 in 1864 to about 200,000 in 1910. Much of the old town centre and other surroundings were levelled and redeveloped to provide for the growing city. The Kiel tramway network, opened in 1881, had been enlarged to 10 lines, with a total route length of 40 km (25 mi), before the end of the First World War.

Kiel was the site of the sailors' mutiny which led to the German Revolution in late 1918. Just before the end of the First World War, the German fleet stationed at Kiel was ordered to sail out for a last great battle with the Royal Navy. The sailors, who thought of it as a suicide mission which would have no effect on the outcome of the war, decided they had nothing to lose and refused to obey orders. They took over Kiel and then spread out to other north German ports, sparking the revolution which led to the abolition of the monarchy and the creation of the Weimar Republic.

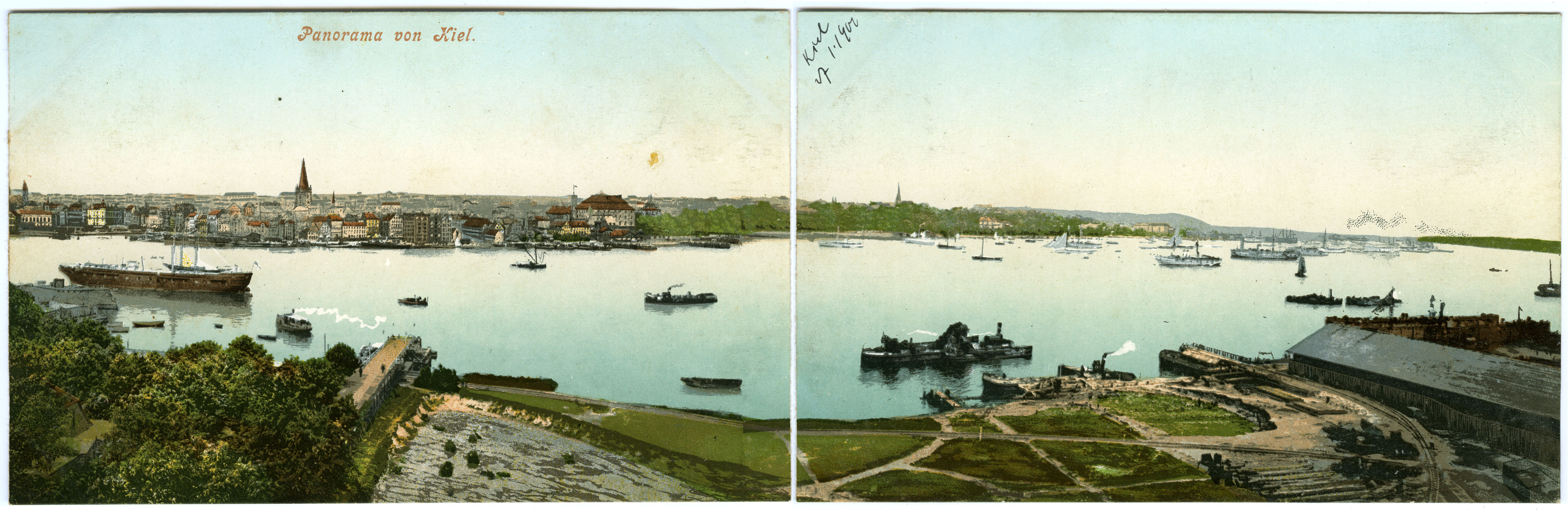
Double-postcard panorama of Kiel from across the Kiel Fjord, 1902

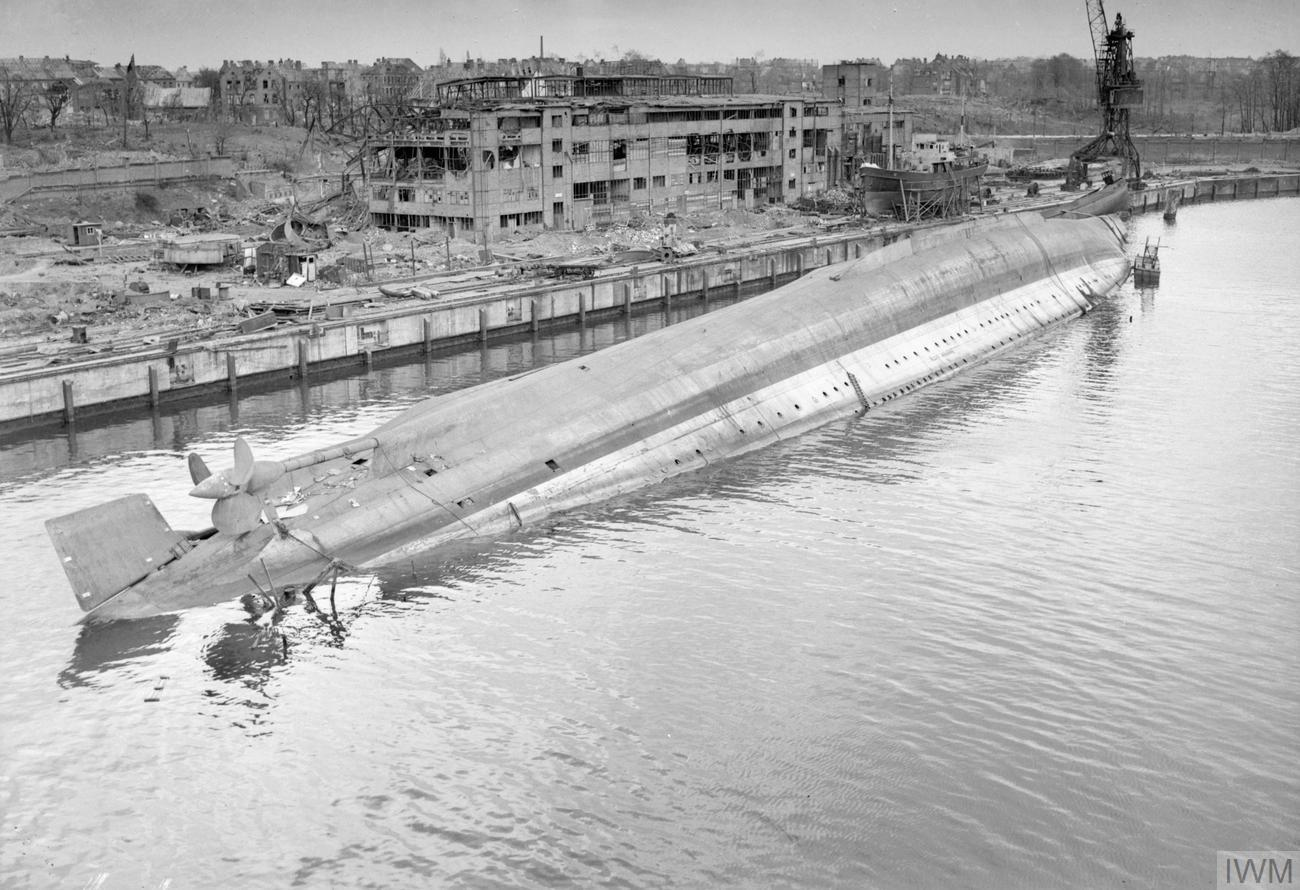
The German cruiser Admiral Scheer capsized in the docks at Kiel after being hit in an RAF raid on the night of 9/10 April 1945.

Kiel Harbour, an Admiralty chart of 1971

During the Second World War, Kiel remained one of the major naval bases and shipbuilding centres of the German Reich. There was also a labour camp for the local industry. Owing to its status as a naval port and production site for submarines, Kiel was heavily bombed by the Allies during this period. The bombing destroyed more than 80% of the remaining old town, 72% of the central residential areas, and 83% of the industrial areas. During the RAF bombing of 23/24 July 1944, Luftwaffe fighters tried to intercept the spoof (i.e. decoy) force instead of the main force attacking Kiel, and there was no water for three days; trains and buses did not run for eight days and there was no gas available for cooking for three weeks.

There were several bombing raids of the port area during the period 20 February – 20 April 1945 which successfully eliminated many U-boats, and the few large warships (cruisers Hipper, Scheer, and Köln) still afloat at that time. It and its port, and the canal were seized by a British T-Force led by Major Tony Hibbert on 5 May 1945.

Like other heavily bombed German cities, the city was rebuilt after the war. In 1946, the British Military Government issued Ordinance No. 46, dissolving the old Prussian province in its place and elevating Schleswig-Holstein's status as a state, and Kiel was explicitly named as the capital of this new state. On May 2, 1950, the state parliament moved into the plenary hall. On May 3, 1950, the state parliament left its temporary houses across the state and moved into Kiel.

Today, Kiel is once again an important maritime centre of Germany, with high-tech shipbuilding, submarine construction and one of the world's largest ocean research centers, the GEOMAR. In 2006, Kiel was one of the founding cities of the original European Green Capital Award.

== Geography ==
=== Climate ===
Kiel has an oceanic climate (Köppen: Cfb; Trewartha: Dolk). Because Kiel is located on the Baltic Sea coast, its temperature fluctuates less than inland, with warm winters and cool summers throughout the year. The average temperature ranges from 2 °C (36 °F) in winter to 17 °C (63 °F) in summer. Days with a temperature above 30 °C (86 °F) are rare, with an average of only 2.8 days per year.

The Kiel weather station has recorded the following extreme values:

- Highest Temperature 36.5 °C (97.7 °F) on 20 July 2022.
- Warmest Minimum 22.1 °C (71.8 °F) on 1 August 1994.
- Coldest Maximum −15.4 °C (4.3 °F) on 12 February 1940.
- Lowest Temperature −24.8 °C (−12.6 °F) on 13 February 1940.
- Highest Daily Precipitation 104.2 mm (4.10 in) on 27 August 1989.
- Wettest Month 252.0 mm (9.92 in) in August 2011.
- Wettest Year 964.4 mm (37.97 in) in 2002.
- Driest Year 454.4 mm (17.89 in) in 1959.
- Longest annual sunshine: 2,115.3 hours in 1959.
- Shortest annual sunshine: 1,299.4 hours in 1987.

Climate data for Kiel (1991–2020 normals, extremes 1940–present (Note: Temperature data for Kiel have been recorded since 1940. The weather station data used from 1 January 1940 to 15 October 1988 came from Kiel-Kronshagen, and temperature data from 1 January 1974 to the present are from Kiel-Holtenau.))
Month	Jan	Feb	Mar	Apr	May	Jun	Jul	Aug	Sep	Oct	Nov	Dec	Year
Record high °C (°F)	14.6 (58.3)	17.7 (63.9)	21.9 (71.4)	29.3 (84.7)	33.5 (92.3)	34.4 (93.9)	36.5 (97.7)	35.1 (95.2)	30.1 (86.2)	25.2 (77.4)	19.5 (67.1)	14.8 (58.6)	36.5 (97.7)
Mean maximum °C (°F)	10.0 (50.0)	10.8 (51.4)	15.3 (59.5)	21.3 (70.3)	24.6 (76.3)	27.4 (81.3)	29.3 (84.7)	30.0 (86.0)	24.7 (76.5)	19.2 (66.6)	13.9 (57.0)	10.8 (51.4)	31.4 (88.5)
Mean daily maximum °C (°F)	4.0 (39.2)	4.6 (40.3)	8.0 (46.4)	12.7 (54.9)	16.5 (61.7)	19.8 (67.6)	22.2 (72.0)	22.1 (71.8)	18.2 (64.8)	13.1 (55.6)	8.0 (46.4)	5.0 (41.0)	12.8 (55.0)
Daily mean °C (°F)	2.0 (35.6)	2.3 (36.1)	4.4 (39.9)	8.1 (46.6)	12.0 (53.6)	15.3 (59.5)	17.7 (63.9)	17.6 (63.7)	14.2 (57.6)	10.0 (50.0)	5.8 (42.4)	3.0 (37.4)	9.3 (48.7)
Mean daily minimum °C (°F)	−0.4 (31.3)	−0.4 (31.3)	1.4 (34.5)	3.9 (39.0)	7.2 (45.0)	10.5 (50.9)	13.0 (55.4)	13.1 (55.6)	10.6 (51.1)	6.9 (44.4)	3.4 (38.1)	0.9 (33.6)	5.8 (42.4)
Mean minimum °C (°F)	−8.3 (17.1)	−7.5 (18.5)	−4.2 (24.4)	−2.2 (28.0)	0.2 (32.4)	5.2 (41.4)	8.2 (46.8)	8.0 (46.4)	5.1 (41.2)	0.5 (32.9)	−2.9 (26.8)	−6.1 (21.0)	−10.4 (13.3)
Record low °C (°F)	−20.8 (−5.4)	−24.8 (−12.6)	−14.5 (5.9)	−6.9 (19.6)	−3.0 (26.6)	1.6 (34.9)	4.3 (39.7)	4.7 (40.5)	0.6 (33.1)	−6.2 (20.8)	−12.0 (10.4)	−15.1 (4.8)	−24.8 (−12.6)
Average precipitation mm (inches)	66.8 (2.63)	49.7 (1.96)	49.9 (1.96)	39.7 (1.56)	51.4 (2.02)	65.1 (2.56)	83.8 (3.30)	77.3 (3.04)	65.6 (2.58)	72.1 (2.84)	63.7 (2.51)	70.5 (2.78)	754.2 (29.69)
Average extreme snow depth cm (inches)	4.9 (1.9)	7.1 (2.8)	4.1 (1.6)	0.2 (0.1)	0 (0)	0 (0)	0 (0)	0 (0)	0 (0)	0 (0)	1.1 (0.4)	3.5 (1.4)	11.5 (4.5)
Average precipitation days (≥ 1.0 mm)	18.6	16.8	15.3	13.2	13.4	14.0	15.3	15.6	15.4	17.1	18.4	19.3	190.7
Average snowy days (≥ 1.0 cm)	5.0	6.4	1.6	0.1	0	0	0	0	0	0	0.6	2.8	16.5
Average relative humidity (%)	86.7	84.1	80.3	74.8	73.4	73.9	73.8	75.5	79.4	82.5	86.5	88.0	79.9
Mean monthly sunshine hours	40.2	60.5	115.4	190.3	243.7	228.3	242.2	216.7	155.1	106.2	50.3	31.4	1,673.2
Source 1: World Meteorological Organization
Source 2: DWD Open Data

=== Districts ===
Image showing the population density of Kiel by district as of 2010

Kiel has about 40 districts, but there is no standard division. The districts are traditionally grouped into 30 boroughs (Stadtteile). Another, more recent structure summarizes the districts in 18 political districts (Ortsteile). The city has 25 electoral districts.

The biggest districts, by population, are Wik (20,100), Gaarden-Ost (19,200) and Mettenhof (19,900). Gaarden, located at the southern end of the fjord, is a traditional working-class district that used to be home to mainly shipyard workers. Mettenhof is a large housing estate (satellite town) that was built in the 1960s and 1970s on the western outskirts of the city. The city districts of Düsternbrook, Schreventeich, Ravensberg and Blücherplatz, north of the city centre, are popular places to live with many 19th-century buildings, villas and tree-lined streets. The government offices, ministries and parliament of the state of Schleswig-Holstein are also mainly based in these neighbourhoods, particularly Düsternbrook.

In contrast to the heavy bomb damage inflicted on the central parts of the city during the Second World War, most of the residential areas were not severely damaged. Hence, Kiel's more modern-style inner city and Kiel's more historic/elaborate residential areas stand in architectural contrast to one another. There are plans for large-scale improvement and building efforts for the inner city, providing better pavements, better access to and view of the waterfront, and a generally more attractive feel to the place. These plans, most notably the "Kleiner Kiel Kanal", a restoration of a historic canal that was filled in to make way for road infrastructure, are to be implemented in the next few years.

=== Main sights ===
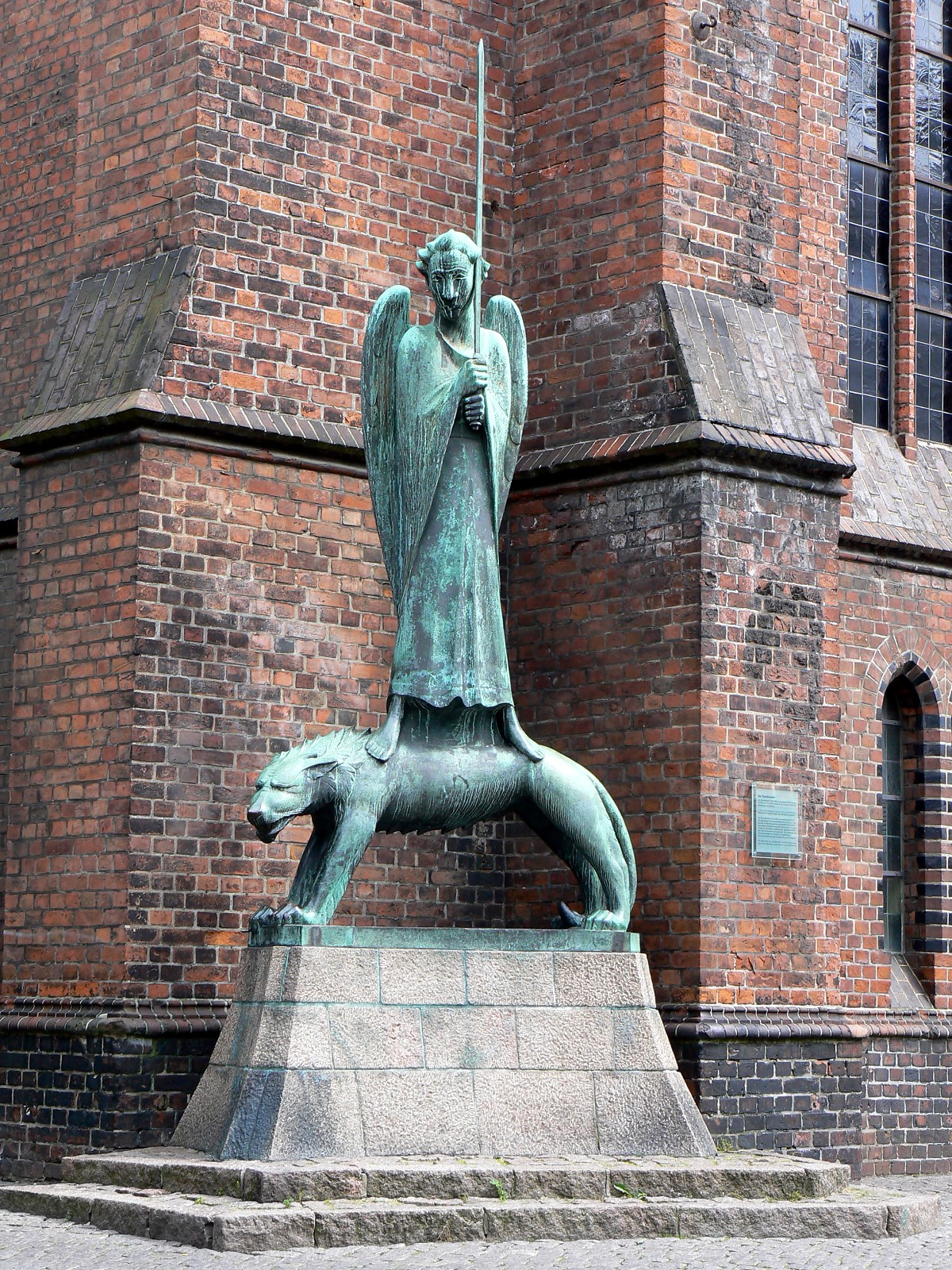
Geistkämpfer in front of the Nikolaikirche, by Ernst Barlach

The oldest building in the city is the 13th-century Church of St. Nicholas, which has a sculpture by Ernst Barlach in front of it called Geistkämpfer.

Kiel is Schleswig-Holstein's largest city, and therefore Kiel's shopping district is a major attraction and will see further improvement and renovation efforts in the upcoming years. Kiel's Holstenstraße (Holsten Street) is one of the longest shopping streets in Germany. The Rathaus (Town Hall), which was built in 1911, has an operating paternoster lift and the design of its tower was based on one in Venice. The square in front of it is bordered by a lake and the Opernhaus Kiel (Kiel Opera House). There are also a number of lakes and parks in the city centre, such as Schrevenpark. There are two botanical gardens, the Old Botanical Garden and the Botanischer Garten der Christian-Albrechts-Universität zu Kiel (or New Botanical Garden).

As Kiel is situated near the sea, the beaches to the north of Kiel, such as Strande, Kiel-Schilksee, Möltenort and Laboe, are also popular places to visit in spring and summer.

Kiel Week, also known in English as the Kiel Regatta, is the largest sailing event in the world and takes place every year in the last full week in June. Many thousands of boats and ships of all kinds and eras take part in the parade. Kiel Week is also a festival, Volksfest and fair as well as a maritime event. There are a number of yachting and sailing clubs in picturesque settings.

Kiel also features a number of museums, including zoological, geological, historical, fine art, industrial and military museums. Notable is the Stadt- und Schifffahrtsmuseum Warleberger Hof (City and Maritime Museum), which belongs to the association Museen am Meer. In addition to preserving architecture from the 16th century and historic rooms with painted stucco ceilings, it displays urban and cultural exhibits of the 19th and 20th centuries. Particularly intriguing is the history of the carnival in Kiel.

The Schifffahrtsmuseum is in the former fish market building in the harbour.

Laboe is home to the Laboe Naval Memorial and the Second World War submarine U-995, which are both popular tourist sites.

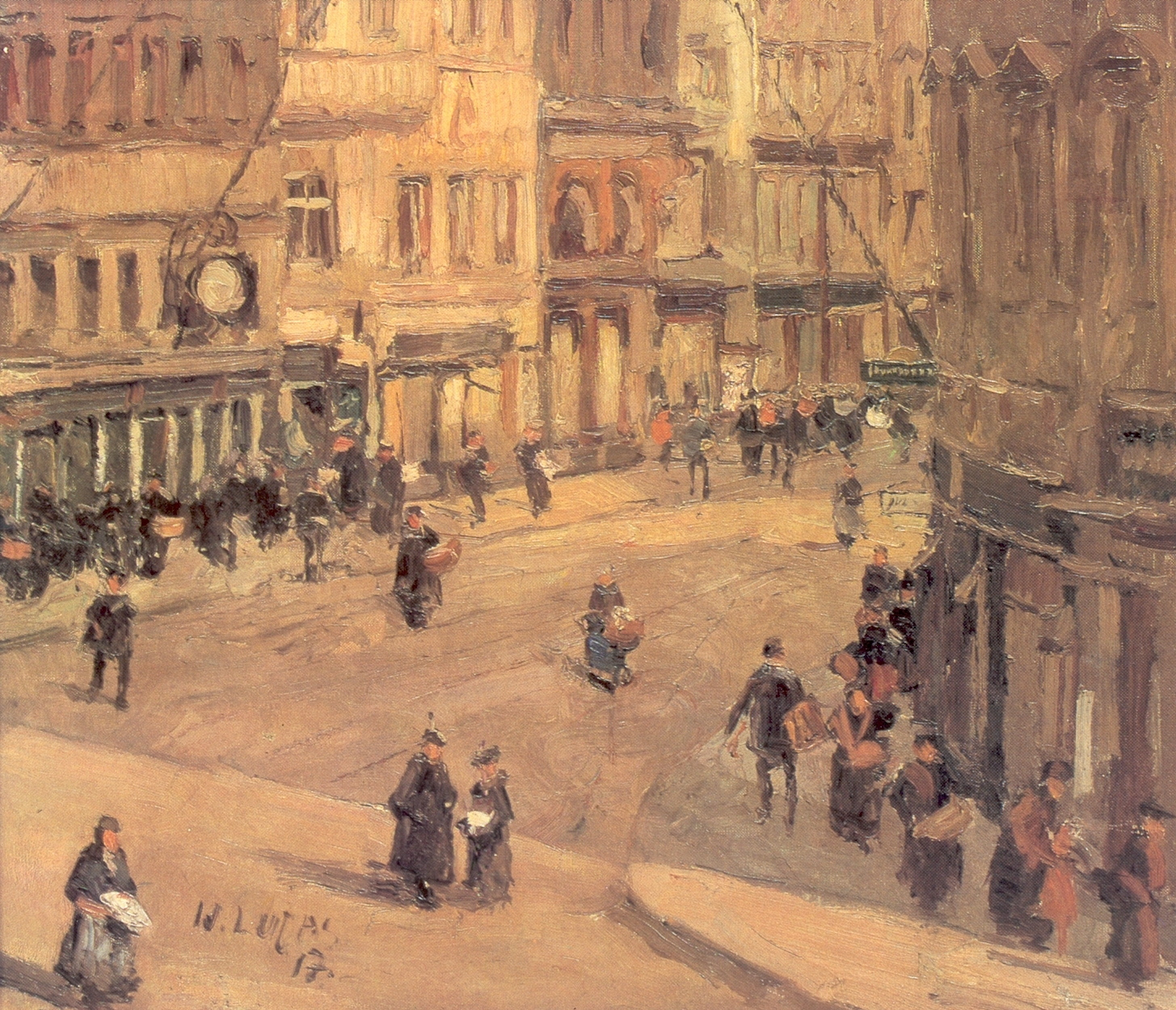
Holstenstraße Kiel 1917, by Willy Lucas

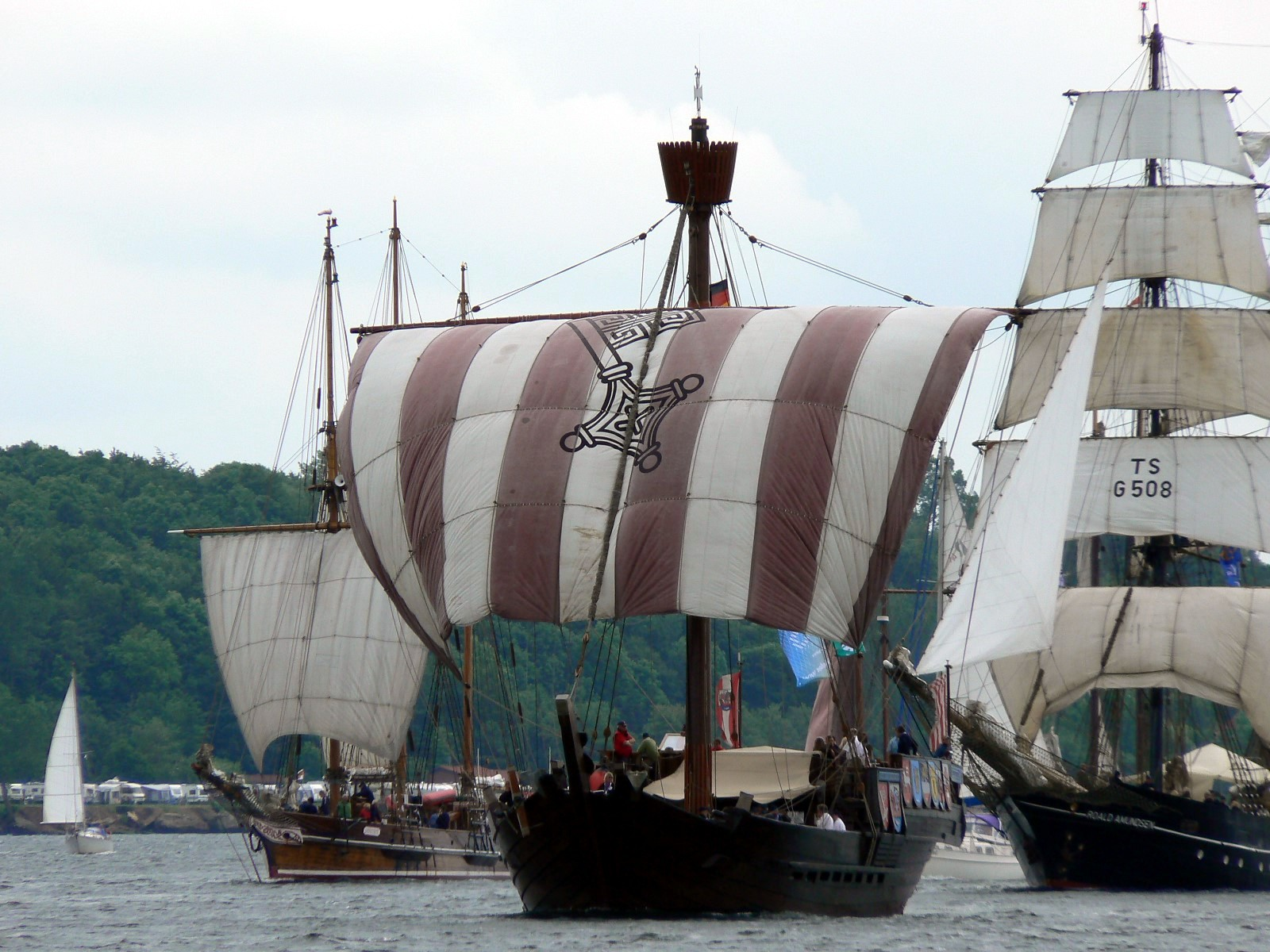
Historic ships at Kiel Week

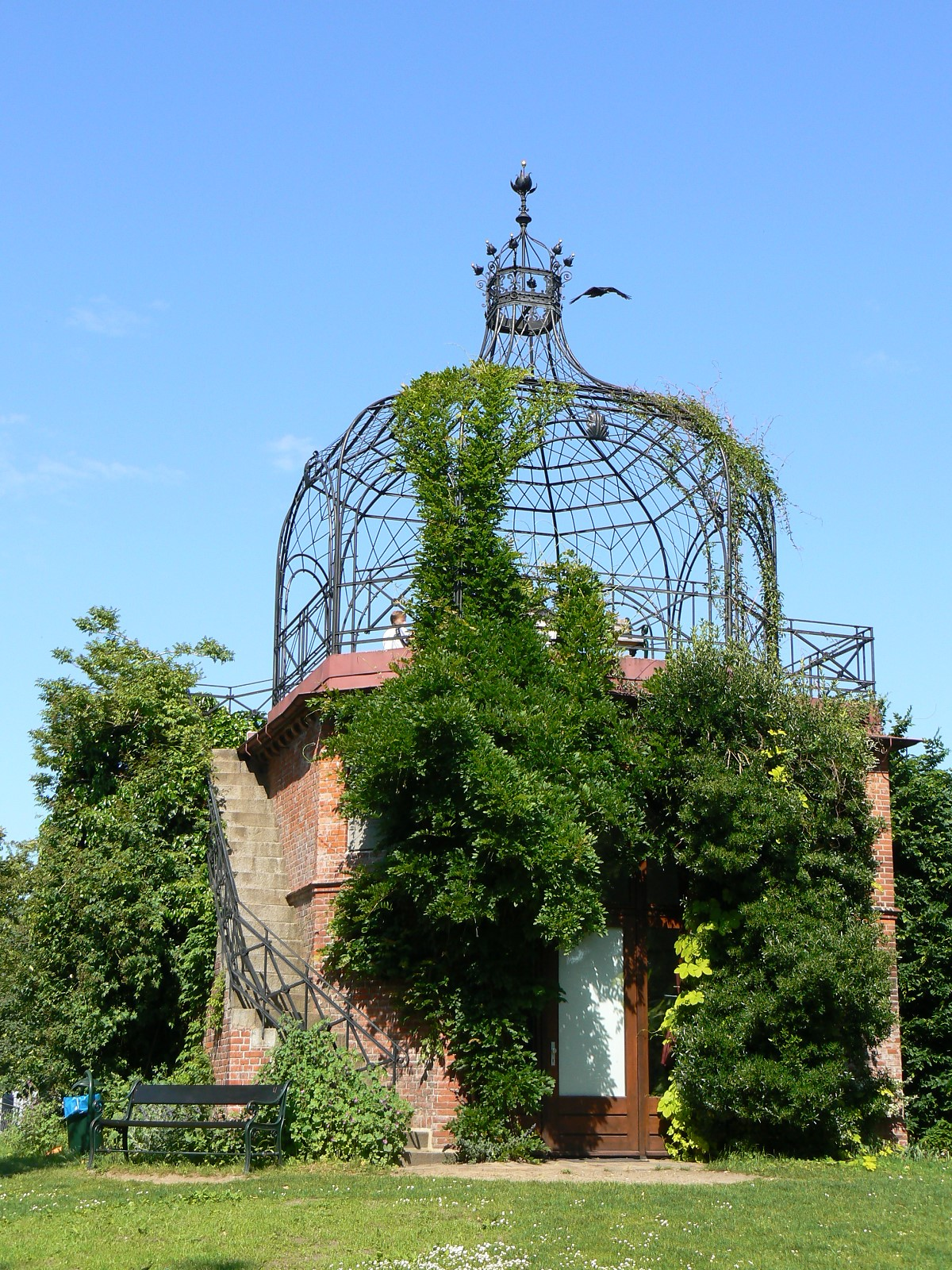
Old Botanical Garden, Kiel

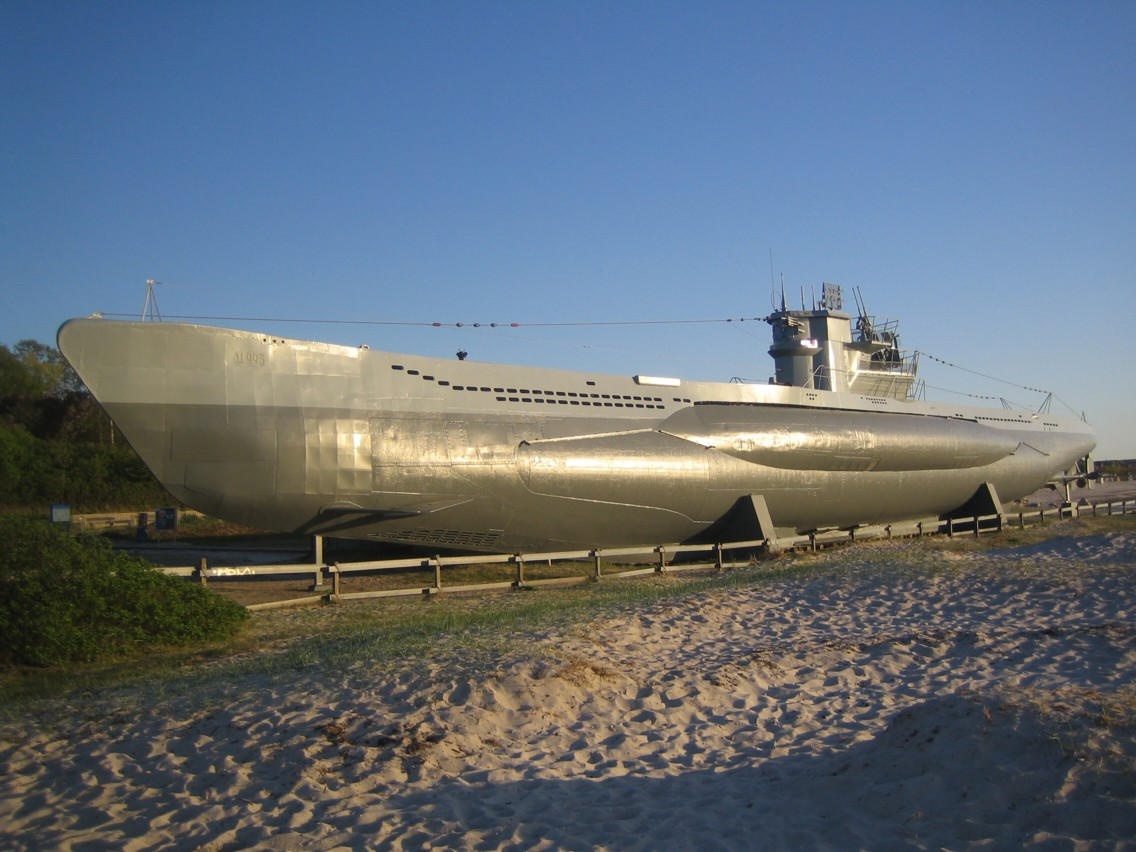
U995 Laboe

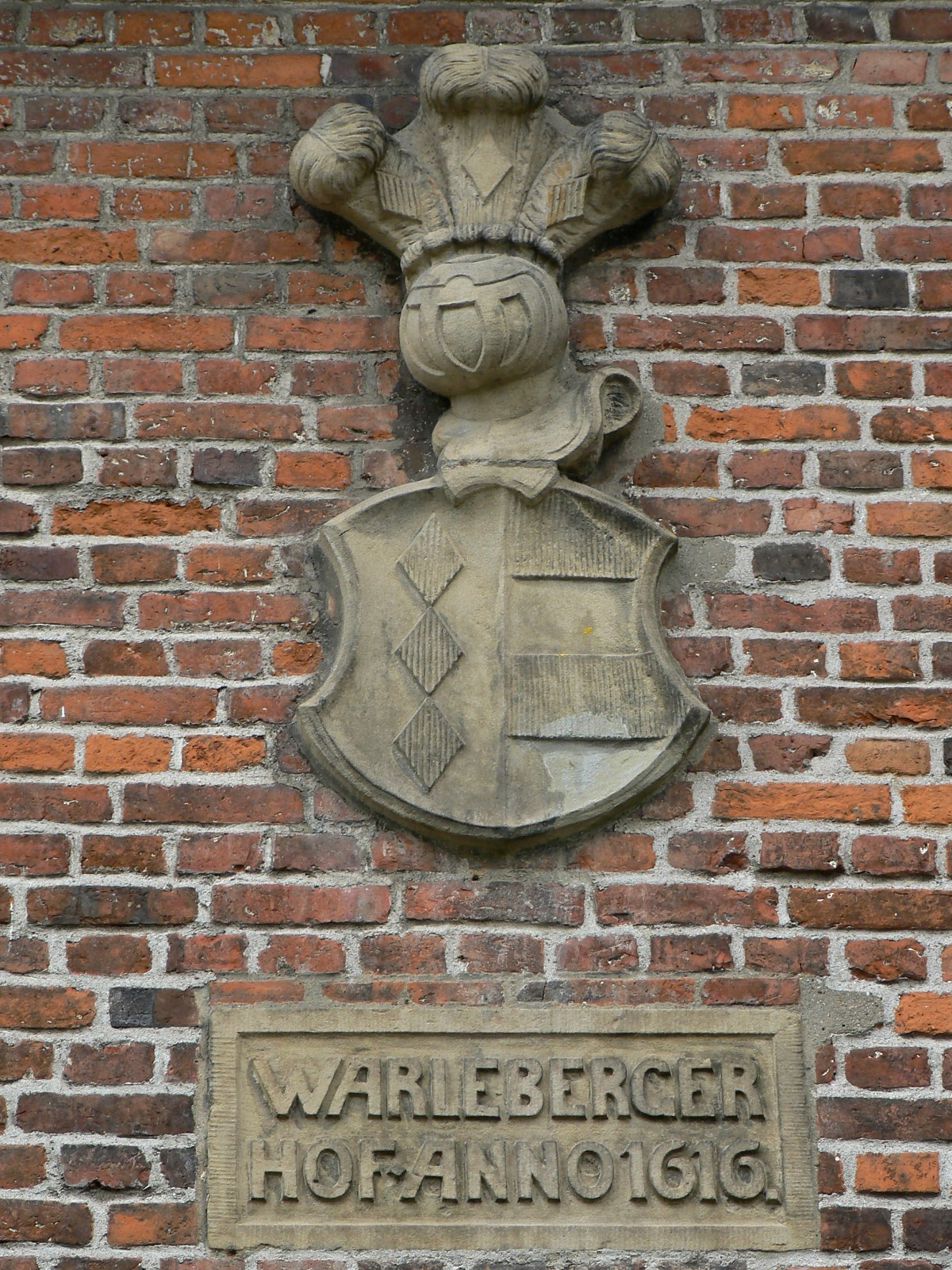
Warleberger Hof

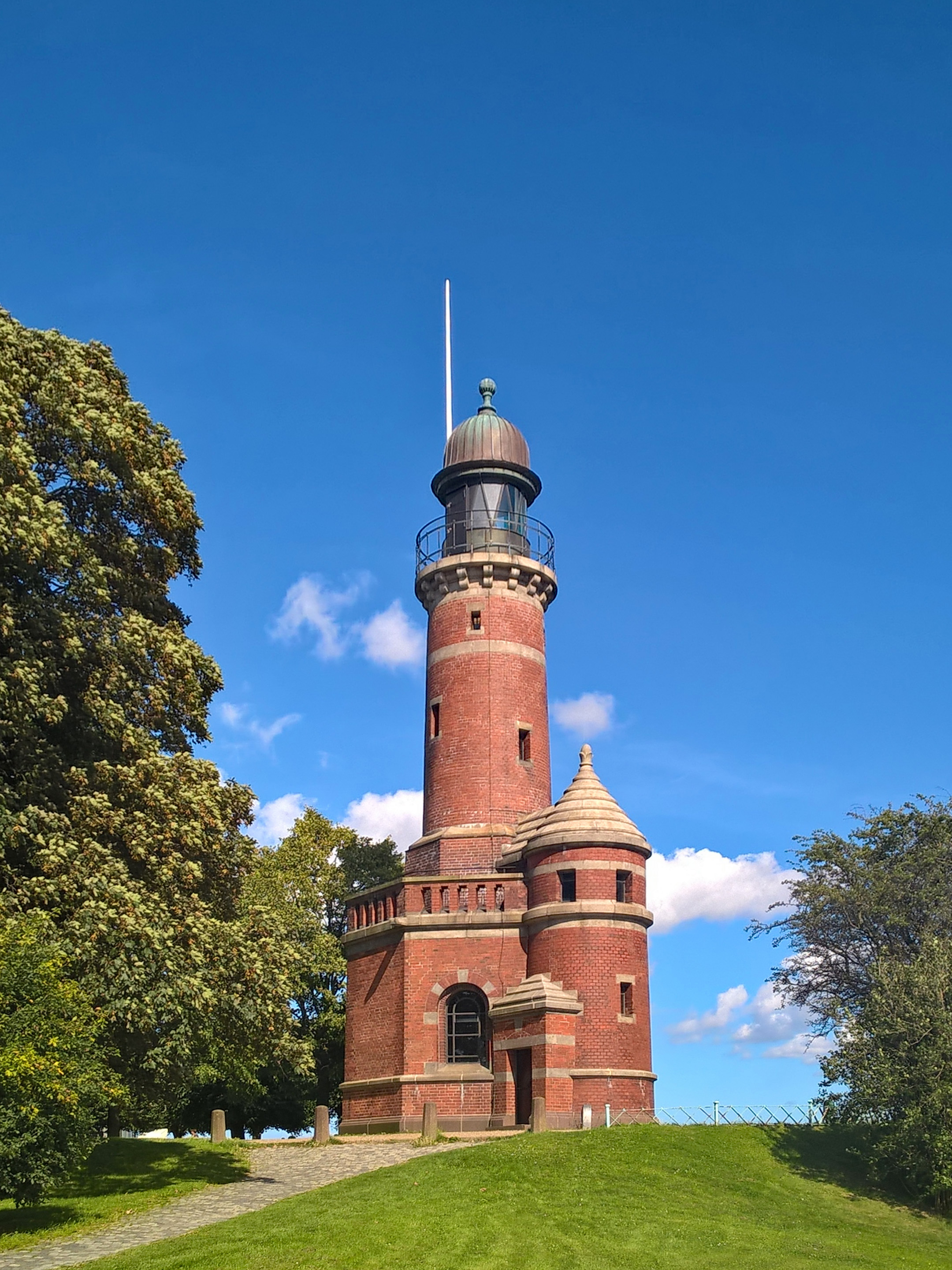
Lighthouse in Kiel-Holtenau

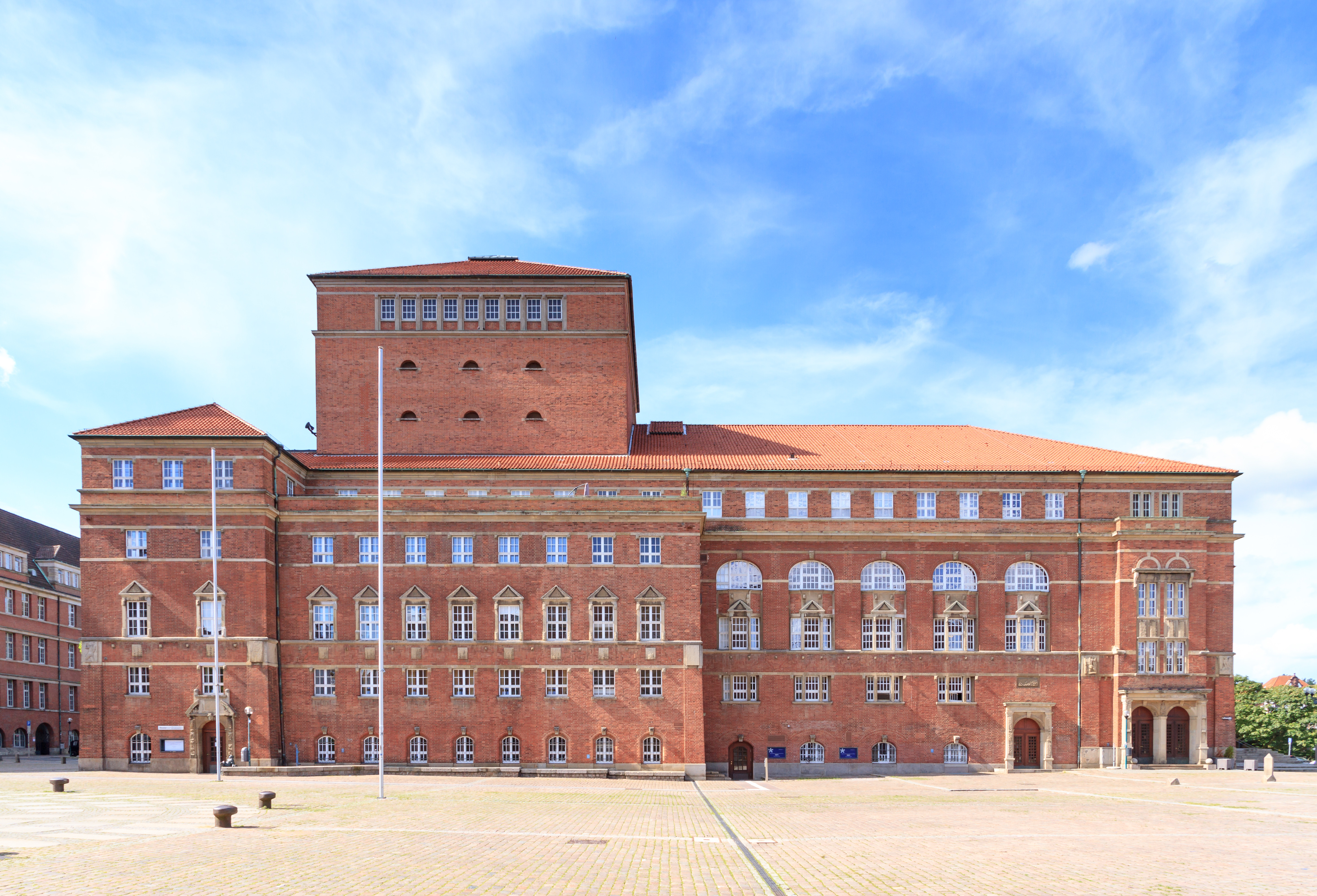
Opera House

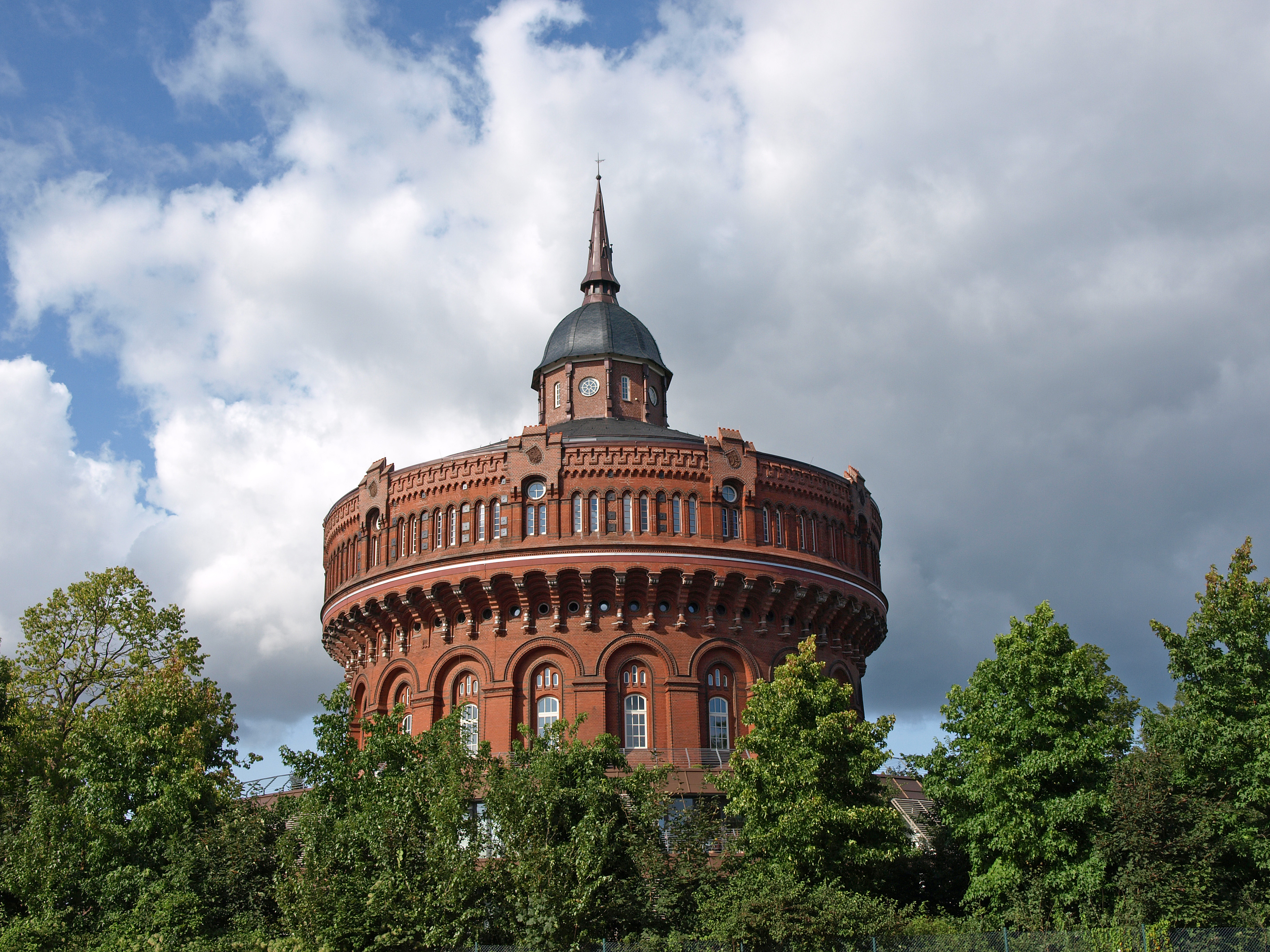
Water tower in Kiel-Ravensberg

== Population ==
Historical population
Year	Pop.	±%
1300	1,000	—
1450	2,000	+100.0%
1682	3,310	+65.5%
1750	4,500	+36.0%
1871	31,764	+605.9%
1900	107,977	+239.9%
1919	205,330	+90.2%
1925	213,587	+4.0%
1933	218,335	+2.2%
1939	273,735	+25.4%
1951	259,629	−5.2%
1956	256,727	−1.1%
1961	273,284	+6.4%
1966	270,309	−1.1%
1971	269,437	−0.3%
1976	259,403	−3.7%
1981	249,786	−3.7%
1986	243,626	−2.5%
1990	245,567	+0.8%
2001	232,242	−5.4%
2011	235,782	+1.5%
2021	249,132	+5.7%
2023	250,412	+0.5%
250412		—
Population size may be affected by changes in administrative divisions. Source:

Kiel has a population of 250,412. In 1946, when Kiel became the capital of Schleswig-Holstein, its population was about 214,000. Kiel is Germany's largest coastal city and its only state capital located on the sea. In the 1950s, Kiel, with its marine port, attracted members of the navy. Kiel had its highest peak of population in 1973 at 273,000. The population has declined since then. Many people moved away from this city and Kiel became very poor and had big problems with unemployed people at that time. Kiel, now a city with universities and active marine stations, attracts many young students and marines to Kiel.

Rank	Nationality	Population (31 Dec. 2022)
1	Syria	4,810
2	Turkey	4,430
3	Ukraine	3,558
4	Iraq	2,240
5	Poland	2,095
6	Bulgaria	1,355
7	Thailand	1,287
8	Croatia	1,015
9	Russia	835
10	Iran	693

== Politics ==
=== City Council ===
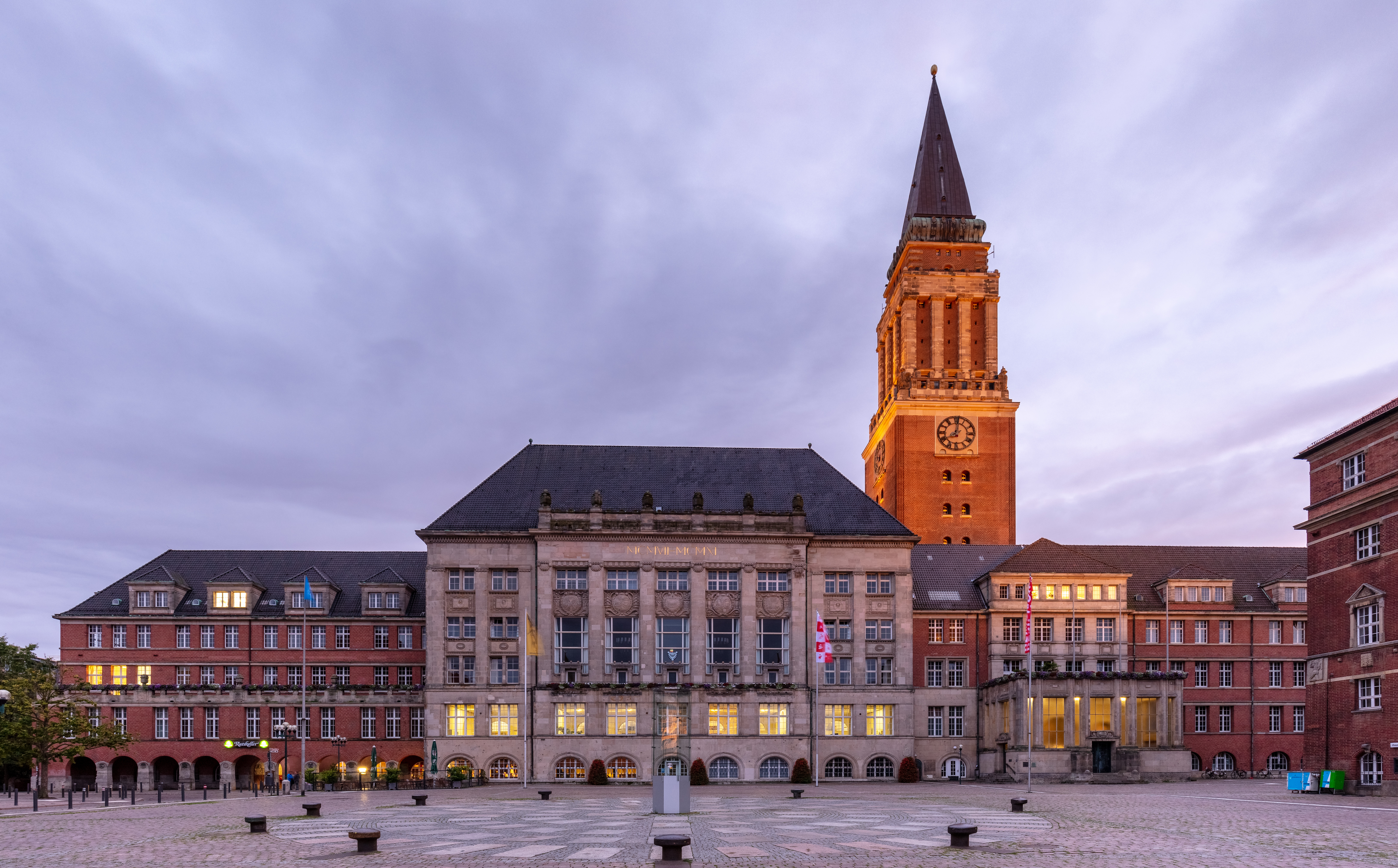
Kiel Town Hall

The City Council is the municipal representative body of Kiel. Its composition is determined by citizens in elections held every five years.

Since the last election on May 14, 2023, in which Alliance 90/The Greens became the strongest party in Kiel for the first time, the city has been governed by a green-red coalition. This coalition, formed by the Greens and the SPD, holds 25 of the 49 seats in the Kiel City Council and operates under a cooperation agreement from 2023 to 2028.

Seats on the City Council after the 2023 Election
Party	Seats
Alliance 90/The Greens (Grüne)	14
Christian Democratic Union (CDU)	11
Social Democratic Party (SPD)	11
South Schleswig Voters' Association (SSW)	4
Alternative for Germany (AfD)	3
Free Democratic Party (FDP)	2
The Left (Die Linke)	2
Grassroots Democratic Party of Germany (Die Basis)	1
Die Partei	1
Total	49

=== Mayor ===
The current mayor of Kiel is Ulf Kämpfer of the Social Democratic Party (SPD). Kämpfer has stated that he will not run for a third five-year term. His current term ends in 2026. The results of the 29 October 2019 election were as follows:

Candidate	Party	Votes	%
Ulf Kämpfer	Social Democratic Party	48,033	65.8
Andreas Ellendt	Christian Democratic Union	14,776	20.3
Björn Thoroe	The Left	6,643	9.1
Florian Wrobel	Die PARTEI	3,513	4.8
Valid votes		72,965	99.3
Invalid votes		500	0.7
Total		73,465	100.0
Electorate/voter turnout		193,653	37.9
Source: City of Kiel

=== 2018 City Council election ===
Results of the 2018 city council election

The Kiel city council governs the city alongside the Mayor. The results of the city council election on 6 May 2018 were as follows:

Party	Votes	%	+/-	Seats	+/-
Social Democratic Party (SPD)	26,617	29.9	▼5.8	18	▼1
Christian Democratic Union (CDU)	20,987	23.5	▼6.2	14	▼1
Alliance 90/The Greens (Grüne)	18,215	20.4	▲2.8	12	▲3
The Left (Die Linke)	6,437	7.2	▲3.8	4	▲2
Free Democratic Party (FDP)	5,764	6.5	▲2.6	4	▲2
Alternative for Germany (AfD)	5,293	5.9	New	3	New
South Schleswig Voters' Association (SSW)	2,521	2.8	▼0.6	2	±0
Die PARTEI	2,278	2.6	New	2	New
Pirate Party Germany (Piraten)	1,011	1.1	▼1.9	1	▼1
Independent	36	0.0	New	0	New
Valid votes	89,159	99.1			
Invalid votes	766	0.9			
Total	89,925	100.0		59	▲6
Electorate/voter turnout	196,334	45.8	▲8.7		
Source: City of Kiel

== Culture ==
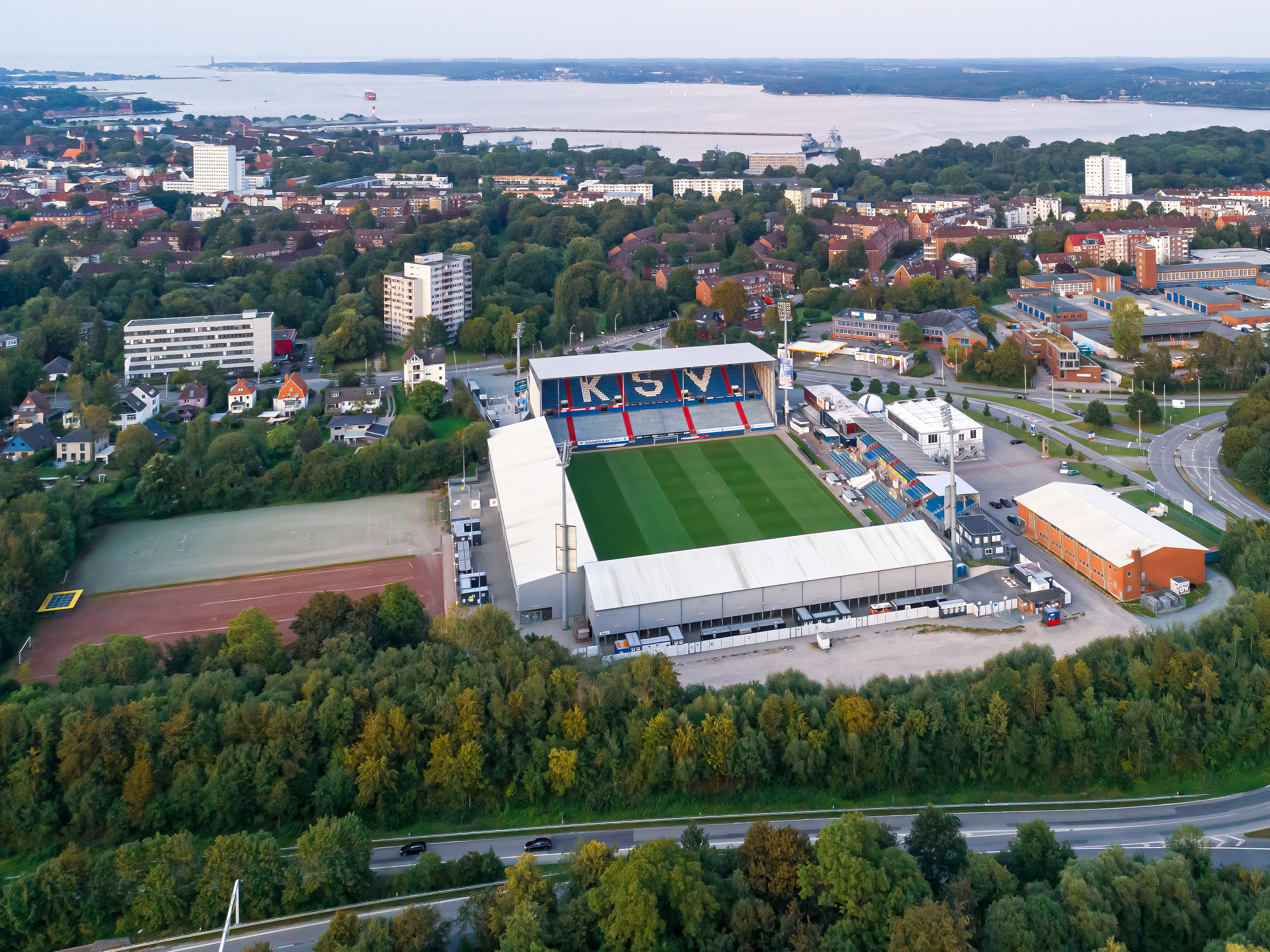
The Holstein Stadium is the home ground of KSV Holstein.

=== Sports ===
There are a number of sports venues in Kiel, most notably the Wunderino Arena (formerly known as Baltic Sea Hall or Ostseehalle), which is the home ground of one of the most successful team handball clubs in the world, the multiple German champion THW Kiel. Holstein Kiel, an association football club, which plays at Holstein-Stadion, played in the Bundesliga in the 2024–2025 season for the first time in the club's history.

== Education and scientific research ==
Kiel University (Christian-Albrechts-Universität) was founded by Duke Christian Albrecht in 1665. It is the only full university of Schleswig-Holstein, with about 27,000 students. Partly linked to Kiel University are other independent research facilities such as the German National Library of Economics – Leibniz Informationcenter for Economy, the Kiel Institute for the World Economy, the GEOMAR Helmholtz Centre for Ocean Research Kiel and the research institute of the Bundeswehr for water sound and geophysics. Besides these, there are other educational institutions such as the Fachhochschule Kiel (founded in 1969) and the Muthesius School of Arts (founded in 1907). The projects Murmann School of Global Management and Economics and Multimedia Campus Kiel were ultimately unsuccessful. The Wirtschaftsakademie Schleswig-Holstein offers, besides advanced training at the Berufsakademie, dual study courses for economists, business information specialists, and industrial engineers.

Noteworthy as a departmental research institute is the federal institute for dairy research, which was merged into the Max-Rubner-Institut together with other institutions in 2004. The state capital Kiel is a corporate sponsoring member of the Max Planck Society.

The ARGE-SH, the oldest research institution in Germany, has its headquarters in Kiel.

There are twelve gymnasiums in Kiel, of which the Kieler Gelehrtenschule, founded in 1320 as a humanistic gymnasium, is the oldest. Other secondary schools include the Gymnasium Elmschenhagen and the Max-Planck-Schule with a focus on natural sciences. There are many comprehensive schools – partially with secondary schools – all over the city area, as well as private schools.

BZ am NOK (Berufsbildungszentrum am Nord-Ostsee-Kanal) is a vocational training center offering education and training in over 40 professions. It includes dual training programs, vocational schools, technical colleges, and vocational grammar schools.

== Economy and infrastructure ==
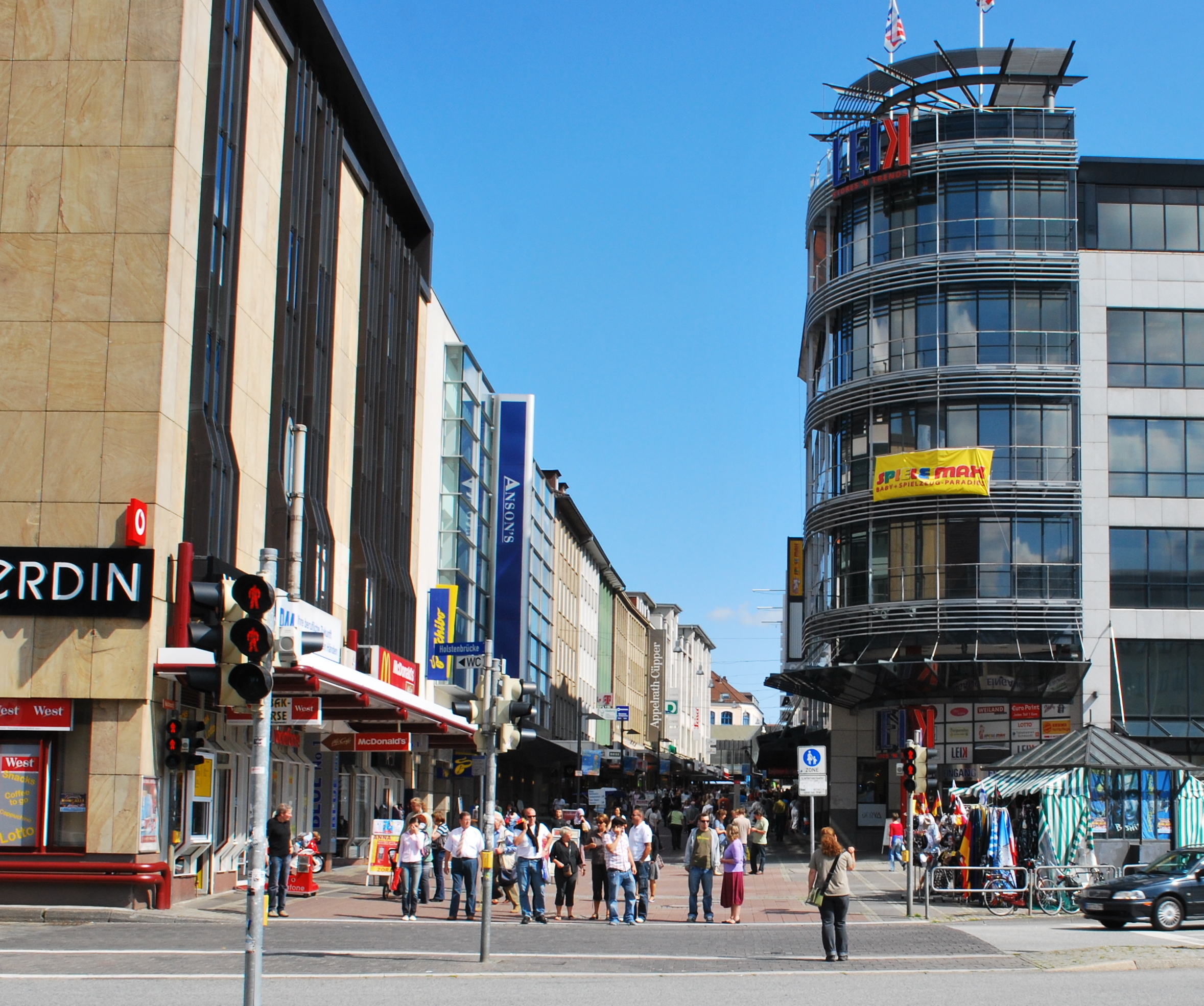
The Holstenstraße is one of the longest shopping streets in Germany — Kiel is the largest city in the state of Schleswig-Holstein.

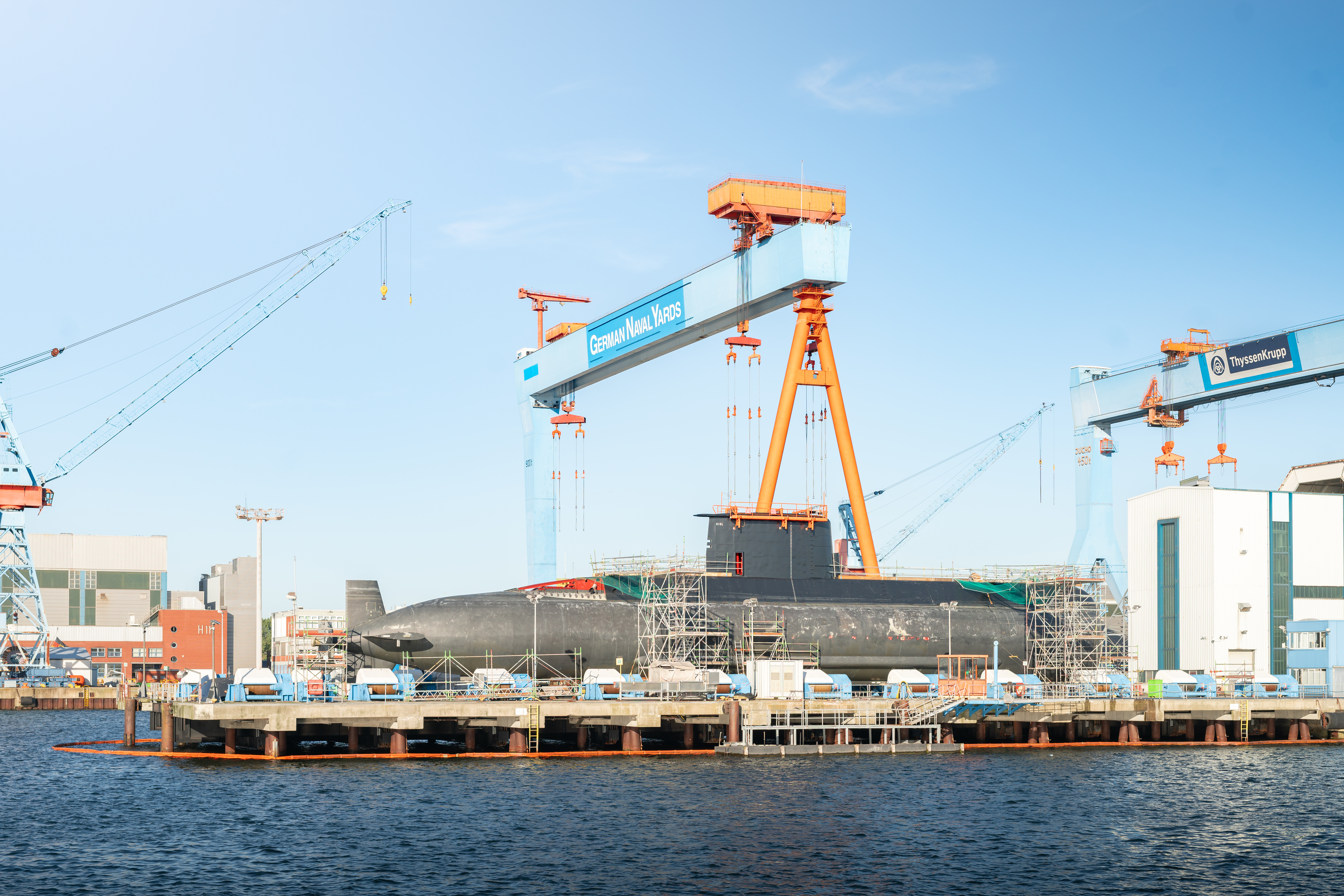
ThyssenKrupp Marine Systems in Kiel

Kiel's economy is dominated by the service sector, transport and maritime industries. Kiel is also one of the major ports of the German Navy, and a leading centre of German high-tech military and civil shipbuilding. Kiel is the home of Howaldtswerke-Deutsche Werft, a shipyard founded in 1838 famed for its construction of submarines. HDW built the first German submarine Brandtaucher in 1850, and is today a subsidiary of ThyssenKrupp Marine Systems, the leading German group of shipyards.

=== Statistics ===
In 2005, the GDP per person was €35,618, which is well above the national average of Germany and 159% of the European Union average.

2005 EUROSTAT	Nominal GDP per capita
Kiel	€35,618
Schleswig-Holstein	€24,250
Germany	€27,219
EU28	€22,400

=== Notable companies ===
Some of the most notable companies having branches or their headquarters in Kiel are:

Ferry operators

- DFDS Seaways
- Stena Line
- Color Line

Military contractors

- Raytheon
- Rheinmetall
- ThyssenKrupp Marine Systems (through its subsidiary Howaldtswerke-Deutsche Werft)

Engineering and industrial machinery

- Heidelberger Druckmaschinen
- Voith
- Vossloh
- Caterpillar Inc. (through its subsidiary MaK)

Others

- LaserSoft Imaging
- Schenker AG
- HSH Nordbank

Kiel is also home to several insurance companies and banks, most notably the HSH Nordbank, Provinzial NordWest, Förde Sparkasse, Kieler Volksbank eG and Evangelische Bank eG.

There is also an active startup scene in Kiel with the startup accelerator StarterKitchen and startups like SciEngines GmbH, Real-Eyes, myBoo, SealMedia, Cliplister, Druckpreis.DE, promotionbasis.de, Yoosello, GetAnEdge, Flowy Apps, fraguru, lokalportal, PianoMotion and ubique art.

Kiel is home to several media companies, including a branch of the Norddeutscher Rundfunk producing one radio channel and several local programmes in Kiel, the daily newspaper Kieler Nachrichten and several smaller local radio channels and magazines.

=== Transport ===
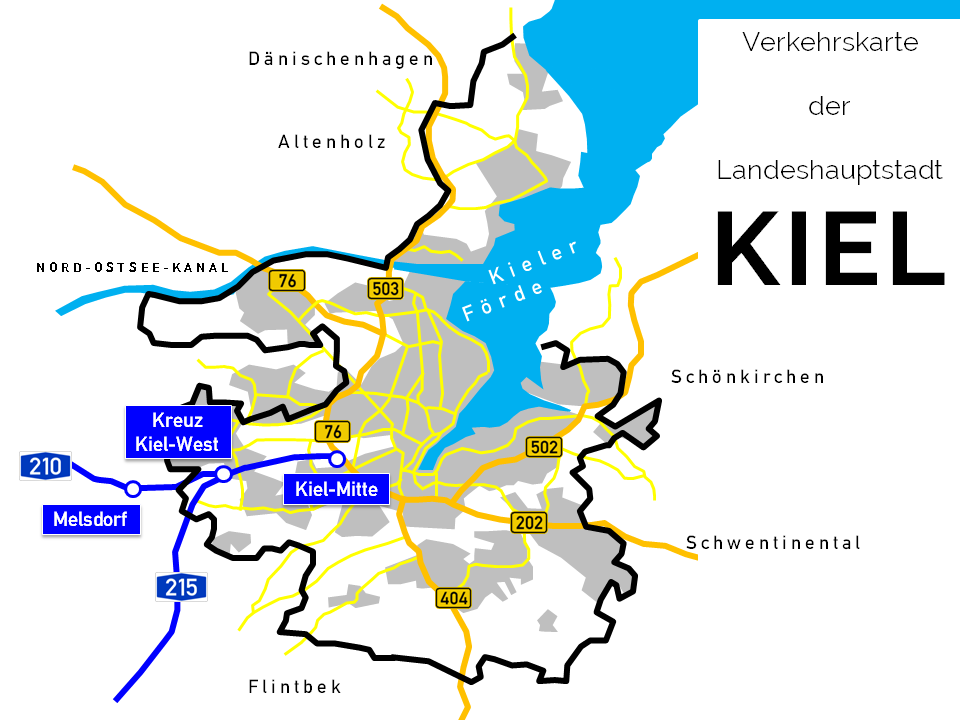
Traffic map

Kiel is situated near an important pan-European motorway, the A7, which connects northern Europe with central and southern Europe.

The central railway station, Kiel Hauptbahnhof, has hourly trains to Hamburg, Lübeck, Flensburg, and Husum. The Intercity Express (ICE) connects Kiel with Berlin, Frankfurt, Cologne and Munich. There are 8 regional railway stations within the city proper, which are connected with each other, the main railway station Kiel Hbf and other stations by regional trains, which can be used within the boundaries of the city with a normal bus ticket.

The city's bus service is provided by the local company KVG. Autokraft and Verkehrsbetriebe Kreis Plön provide regional bus service, and the Schlepp- und Fährgesellschaft Kiel provides public transport on the fjord with ferries.

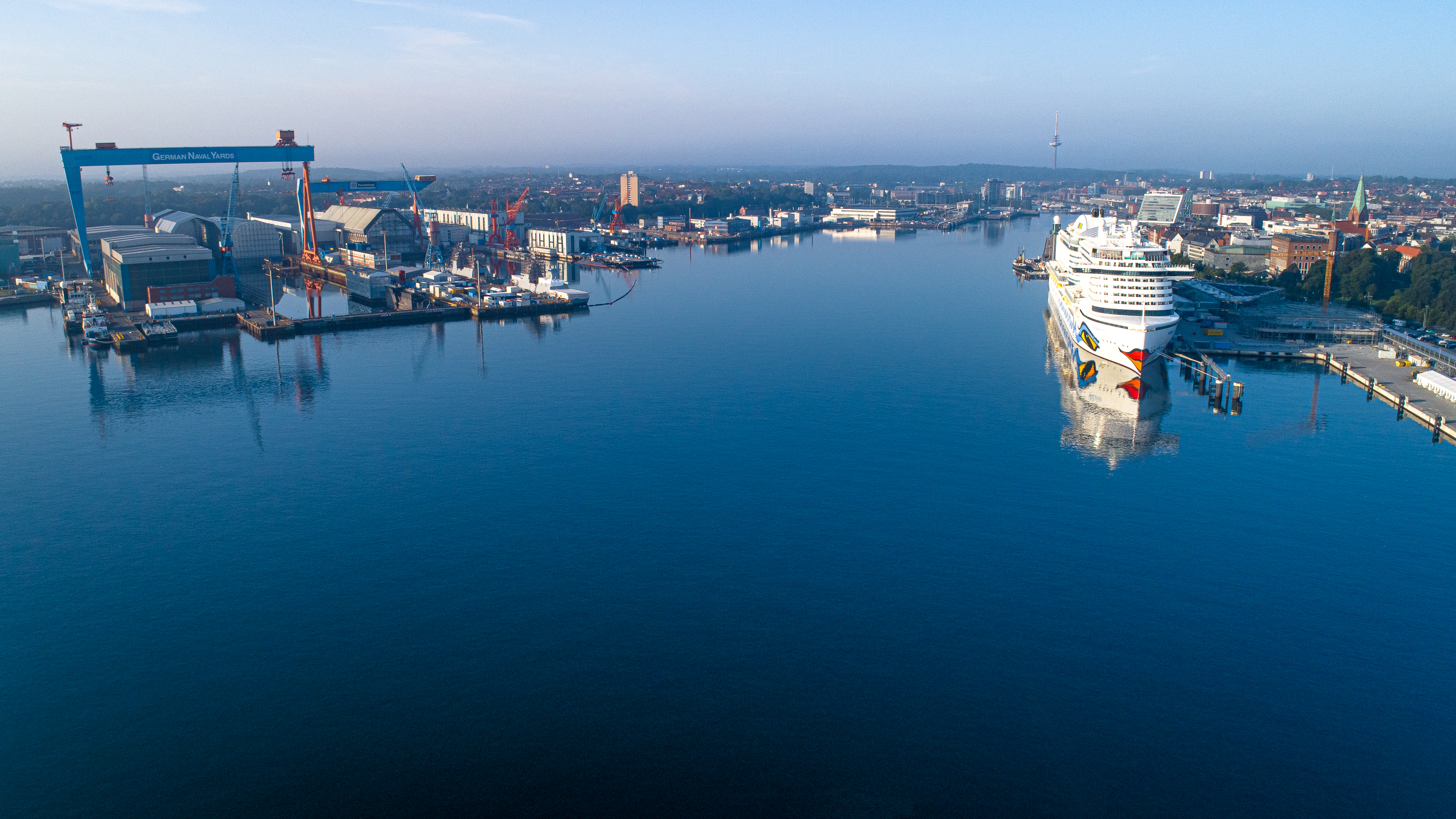
Port of Kiel

The Port of Kiel is a significant port for passenger and cargo shipping from Germany to Scandinavia, the Baltic States and Russia. Passenger ferries operate to and from Gothenburg in Sweden (Stena Line, 13 1/2 hours, daily), Oslo in Norway (Color Line, 19 1/2 hours, daily), and Klaipėda in Lithuania (DFDS Lisco, 21 hours, 6 times per week). Cargo ferries operate to and from Saint Petersburg in Russia (DFDS Lisco, twice a week), and Kaliningrad in Russia (NSA, once a week).

The nearest international airport is Hamburg Airport, which is situated approximately 90 kilometres (56 mi) to the south of Kiel. There is a shuttle bus service (KIELIUS) operating between Hamburg Airport and Kiel's central railway station. There is also an airport at Lübeck.

== Twin towns – sister cities ==
Kiel is twinned with:

- Aarhus, Denmark (2019)
- Antakya, Turkey (2012)
- Brest, France (1964)
- Coventry, United Kingdom (1947)
- Gdynia, Poland (1985)
- Kaliningrad, Russia (1992)
- Kherson, Ukraine (2024)
- Moshi Rural District, Tanzania (2009)
- Samsun, Turkey (2010)
- (United States) San Francisco, USA (2017)
- Sovetsk, Russia (1992)
- Stralsund, Germany (1987)
- Tallinn, Estonia (1986)
- Vaasa, Finland (1967)

== See also ==
- Kiel, Wisconsin
- Steenbek-Projensdorf
