= Steenbek-Projensdorf =

District of Kiel

Coordinates: 54°21′28″N 10°06′39″E

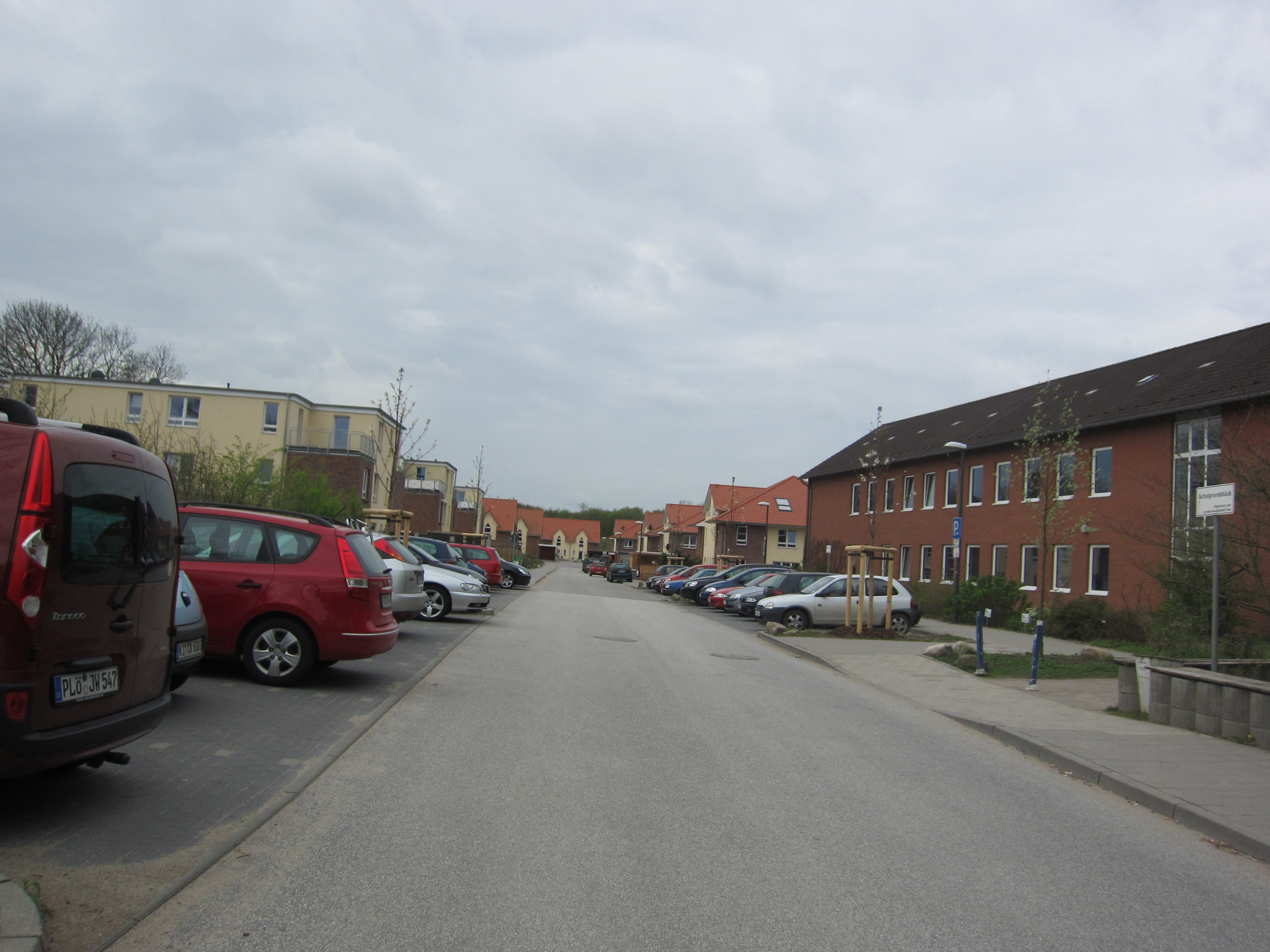
Elfriede-Dietrich-Straße

Steenbek-Projensdorf is a district of Kiel, about five kilometres north of the city centre. The population is 5.869 (End 2018).

== Infrastructure ==
Since the 1960s many people have moved to Steenbek-Projensdorf so that in the 1970s and the 1980s the quarter started to look more city-like. There is a shopping centre including a bank, a travel agency and restaurants. Furthermore there are dormitories, a retirement home, churches, and a gymnasium.

One of the most important new buildings of Steenbek and Kiel, the Lubinus-Klinik, was finished in 1984. Today it is a big medical centre.

== Area ==
=== Origin ===
The area of Steenbek-Projensdorf used to exist within the natural borders next to the areas of Suchsdorf and Klausbrook; the borders passed the edge of the Projensdorfer Gehölz (=Projensdorf Wood) on one side and both sides of the Bremerskamp up to the Olshausenstraße on the other side.

=== Today ===
Today Steenbek-Projensdorf is bounded by the Olof-Palme-Damm between Suchsdorf and Steenbek-Projensdorf, furthermore by the Kiel Canal up to the bridge of Holtenau, by the B 503 - a freeway built in 1972 due to the Olympic Games - up to the tunnel junction with the Steenbeker Weg and lastly by the Projensdorfer Straße up to the Westring including the Holstein-Stadion.

== History ==
Originally the quarters of Steenbek and Projensdorf were a part of its neighbouring village Wik. Between the villages of Wik and Suchsdorf there was the estate Gut Projensdorf which attracted the first farmers at the end of 18th century.

In 1867 Steenbek was incorporated into Kiel as a part of the Wik as well as some parts of Projensdorf. In the course of time the areas Wik and Steenbek-Projensdorf were separated through the Kiel Canal and later the B 503. When the districts were restructured in 1994, Steenbek and Projensdorf were merged into Steenbek-Projensdorf, and finally separated from the Wik.
