= Botanic Gardens of Kiel University =

University botanic garden in Germany

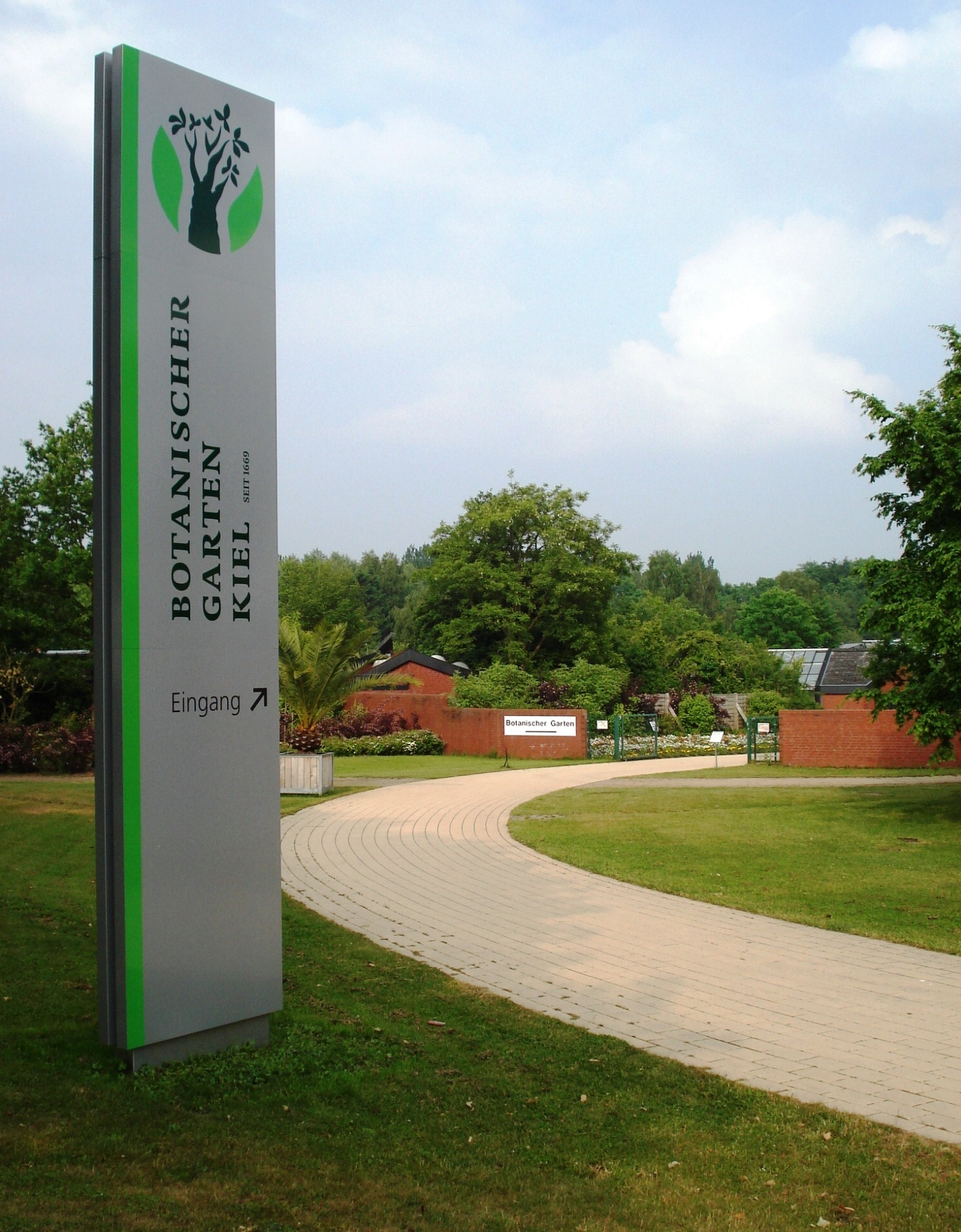
- The entrance of the Kiel Botanical Garden
- Interactive map of Botanic Gardens of Kiel University
- Type: botanical garden and arboretum
- Location: Kiel, Schleswig-Holstein, Germany
- Coordinates: 54°20′20″N 10°7′21″E
- Created: 1985
- Open: Yes
- Website: www.uni-kiel.de/en/botanic-gardens-kiel

The Botanic Gardens of Kiel University (8 hectares) is a botanical garden and arboretum maintained by Kiel University. It is located at Am Botanischen Garten 1, Kiel, Schleswig-Holstein, Germany, and open daily.

== History ==
Kiel has had various botanical gardens since 1668, when professor Johann Daniel Major (1634-1693) established his horticus medicus within the garden of Kiel Castle. It is unclear whether this garden survived the Danish occupation of 1675-1676. Subsequent gardens were established the site of the former Franciscan monastery on the Falckstraße (from 1727) and the garden at the Prüne (from 1803). Kiel's Alter Botanischer Garten (Old Botanical Garden), which still exists, began in 1825 as a private park, was acquired by Kiel University in 1868, and from 1878-1884 was refashioned by botanist Adolf Engler as a botanical garden. It ultimately proved too small, and from 1975-1978 the university created a new botanical garden on its campus, which opened to the public in 1985.

== Collection ==
Today this newer garden contains 14,000 plant species in a variety of outdoor settings and greenhouses. Outdoor areas include an arboretum with tree collections from Asia, America, and Europe; heath and moor; dune habitat; systematic garden; rose garden; alpine garden; and a pond and southern landscape. Seven major exhibition greenhouses (total area 3,000 m²) contain plants from the tropics, subtropics, forests, Mediterranean, deserts of Africa and American, and tropical aquatic regions.

The garden maintains a focus on indigenous plants of Schleswig-Holstein within a broader representation of plants from around the world, including special collections of South African succulents and plants from the Atlantic islands, as well as Adromischus, Aizoaceae, Aristolochia, Campanulaceae, Crassulaceae, Cuscuta, Passiflora, Plumbaginaceae, and Vitaceae. Its herbarium contains about 120,000 specimens of all plant families, with good collections of algae, lichens, fungi, slime mold, mosses, and ferns.

== See also ==
- Alter Botanischer Garten Kiel
- List of botanical gardens in Germany
