= Old Botanical Garden, Kiel =

Former botanical garden and arboretum in Germany

Coordinates: 54.3308°N 10.1472°E

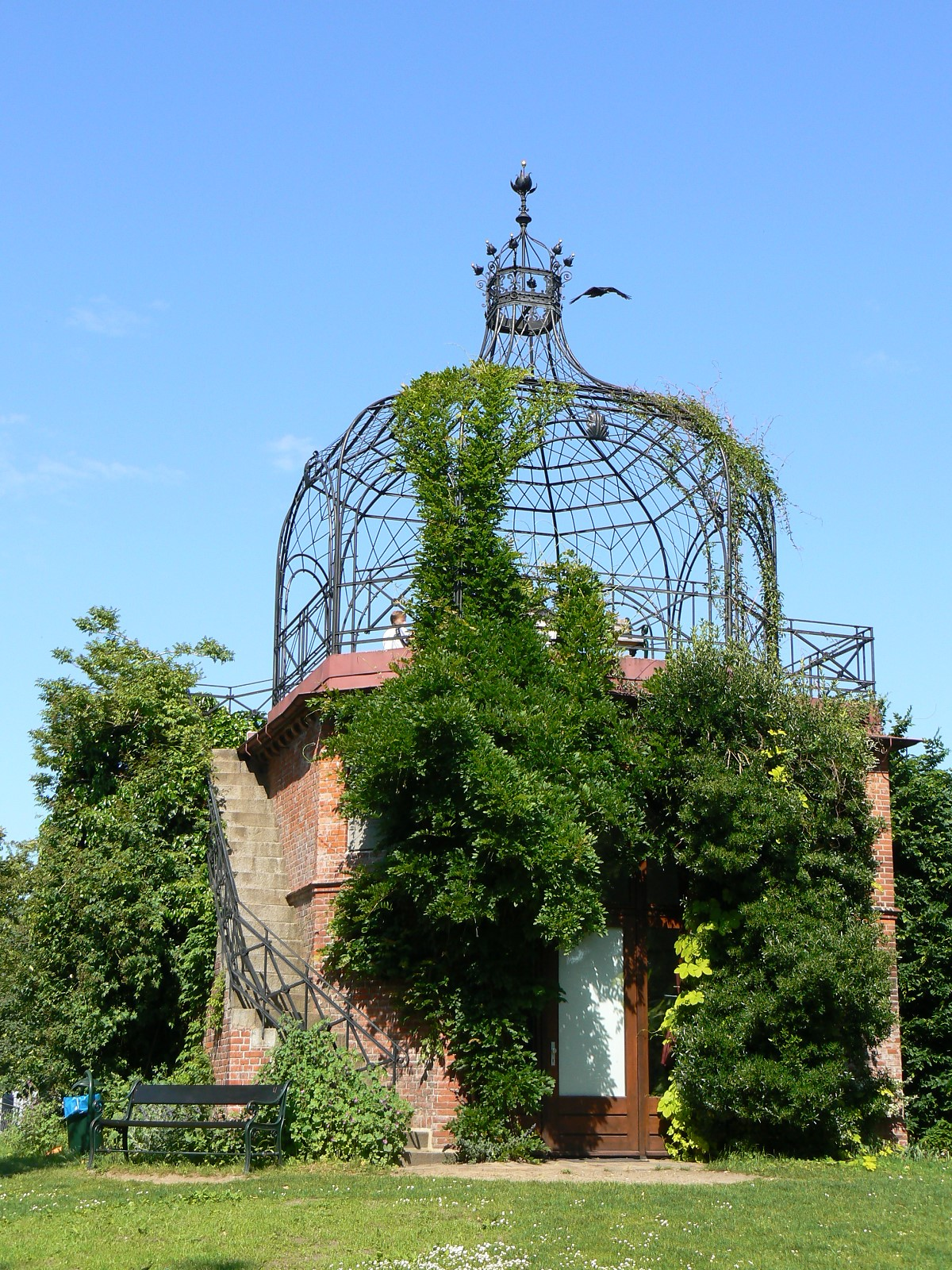
The Old Botanical Garden in Kiel, pavilion

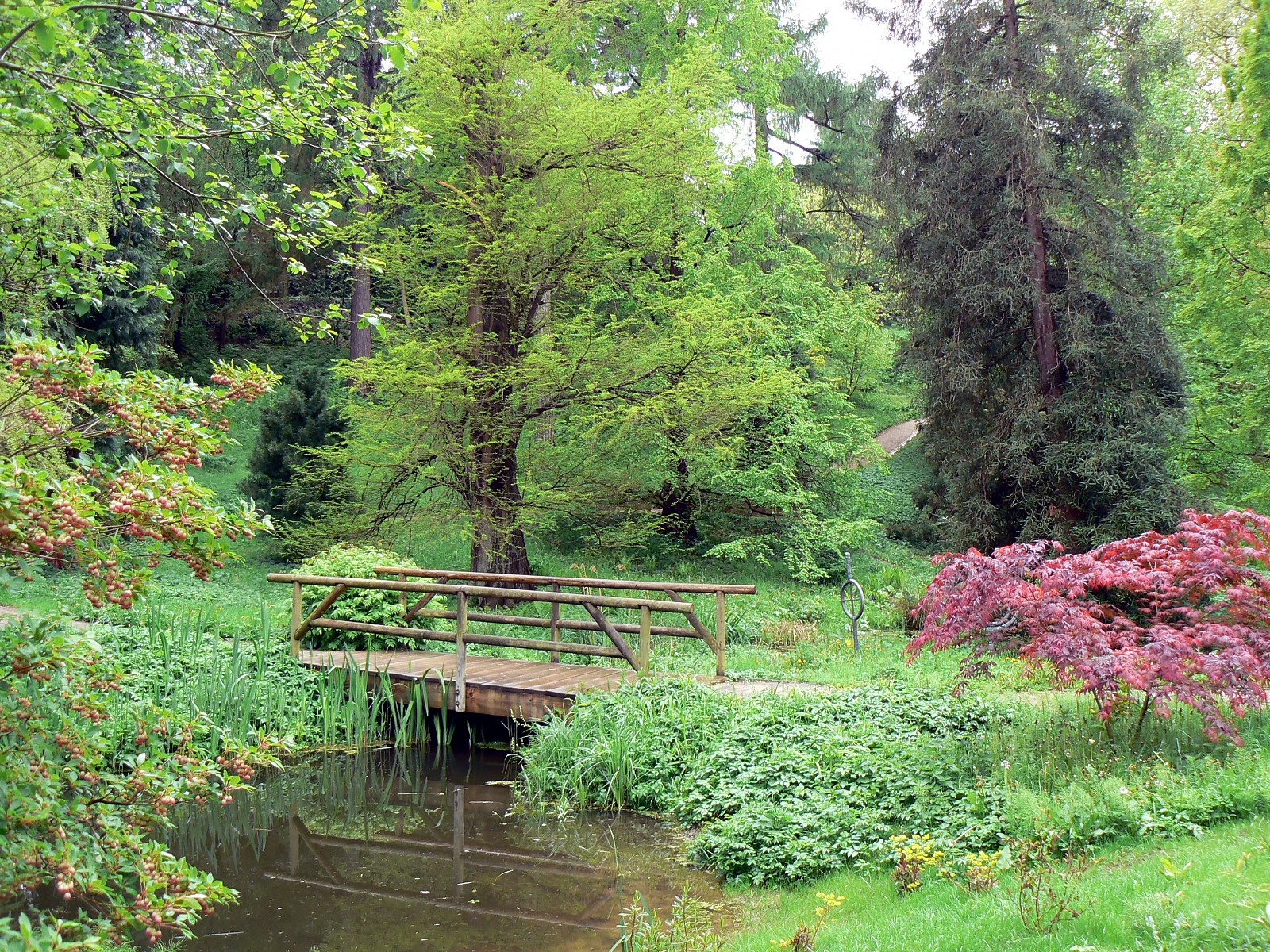
The Old Botanical Garden in Kiel

The Old Botanical Garden in Kiel (German: Alter Botanischer Garten Kiel) (2.5 hectares), also known as the Old Botanical Garden on the Fjord (Alter Botanischer Garten an der Förde), is a former botanical garden and arboretum located at Düsternbrooker Weg 19, Kiel, Schleswig-Holstein, Germany. It is open daily without charge.

Kiel has had various botanical gardens since 1668, when professor Johann Daniel Major (1634–1693) established his horticus medicus within the garden of Kiel Castle. It is unclear whether this garden survived the Danish occupation of 1675–1676. Subsequent gardens were established on the site of the former Franciscan monastery on the Falckstraße (from 1727) and the garden at the Prüne (from 1803). No trace of these early gardens remains.

The Old Botanical Garden began as the private park of tobacco manufacturer Abraham Christian Brauer, who in 1825 created a garden with curved walkways, differentiated woody plantings, a swan pond, and excellent views of Kiel's fjord landscape. Upon his death in 1868 the site was acquired by Kiel University, and from 1878 to 1884 was refashioned by botanist Adolf Engler as a botanical garden, introducing geographic plantings of exotic species while preserving the landscape aesthetics. In 1891 the university added a hilltop pavilion, an octagonal brick building with a graceful dome of iron mesh, and in 1906 added the garden inspector's cottage. After the university created a new botanical garden on its campus in 1978 (the University Botanical Gardens), the garden became a public park in 1980. Its fence and pavilion were extensively restored from 1984 to 1994, and since 1998 the cottage has served as the Literature House of Schleswig-Holstein.

Today the garden contains more than 280 species of diverse herbaceous flora, with an interesting collection of trees that includes one of the largest ginkgo trees in Schleswig-Holstein, two specimens of Metasequoia glyptostroboides said to be the oldest of their kind on the European mainland (planted circa 1948 from Arnold Arboretum seeds), and mature specimens of Amur cork tree, Juniperus rigida, Sequoia sempervirens, and Taxodium distichum. The garden also contains two ponds, lawn areas, and perennial flower beds.

== See also ==
- List of botanical gardens in Germany
- Botanischer Garten der Christian-Albrechts-Universität zu Kiel
