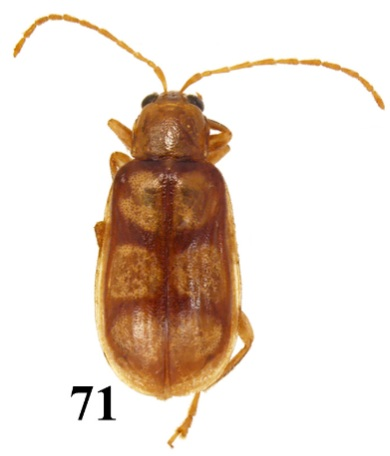

Scientific classification
- Kingdom: Animalia
- Phylum: Arthropoda
- Clade: Pancrustacea
- Class: Insecta
- Order: Coleoptera
- Suborder: Polyphaga
- Infraorder: Cucujiformia
- Family: Chrysomelidae
- Genus: Paranapiacaba
- Species: P. dorsoplagiata

Binomial name
- Paranapiacaba dorsoplagiata (Jacoby, 1837)

Synonyms
- Diabrotica dorsoplagiata Jacoby, 1837

= Paranapiacaba dorsoplagiata =

Species of beetle

Paranapiacaba dorsoplagiata is a species of beetle of the family Chrysomelidae. It is found in Ecuador.
