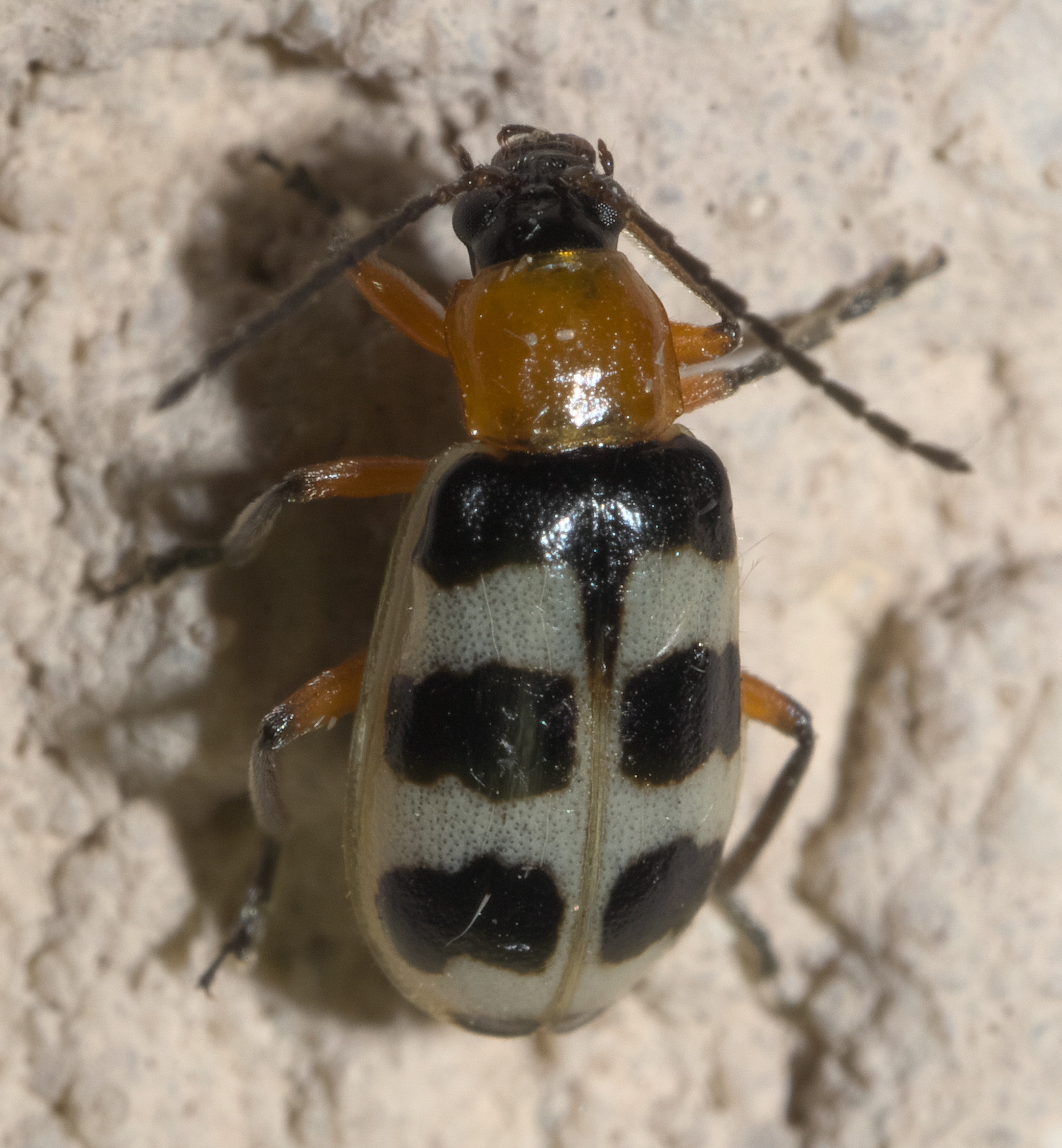

Scientific classification
- Kingdom: Animalia
- Phylum: Arthropoda
- Clade: Pancrustacea
- Class: Insecta
- Order: Coleoptera
- Suborder: Polyphaga
- Infraorder: Cucujiformia
- Family: Chrysomelidae
- Genus: Paranapiacaba
- Species: P. tricincta

Binomial name
- Paranapiacaba tricincta (Say, 1824)

= Paranapiacaba tricincta =

Species of beetle

Paranapiacaba tricincta, the checkered melon beetle, is a species of skeletonizing leaf beetle or flea beetle in the family Chrysomelidae. It is found in Central America and North America.

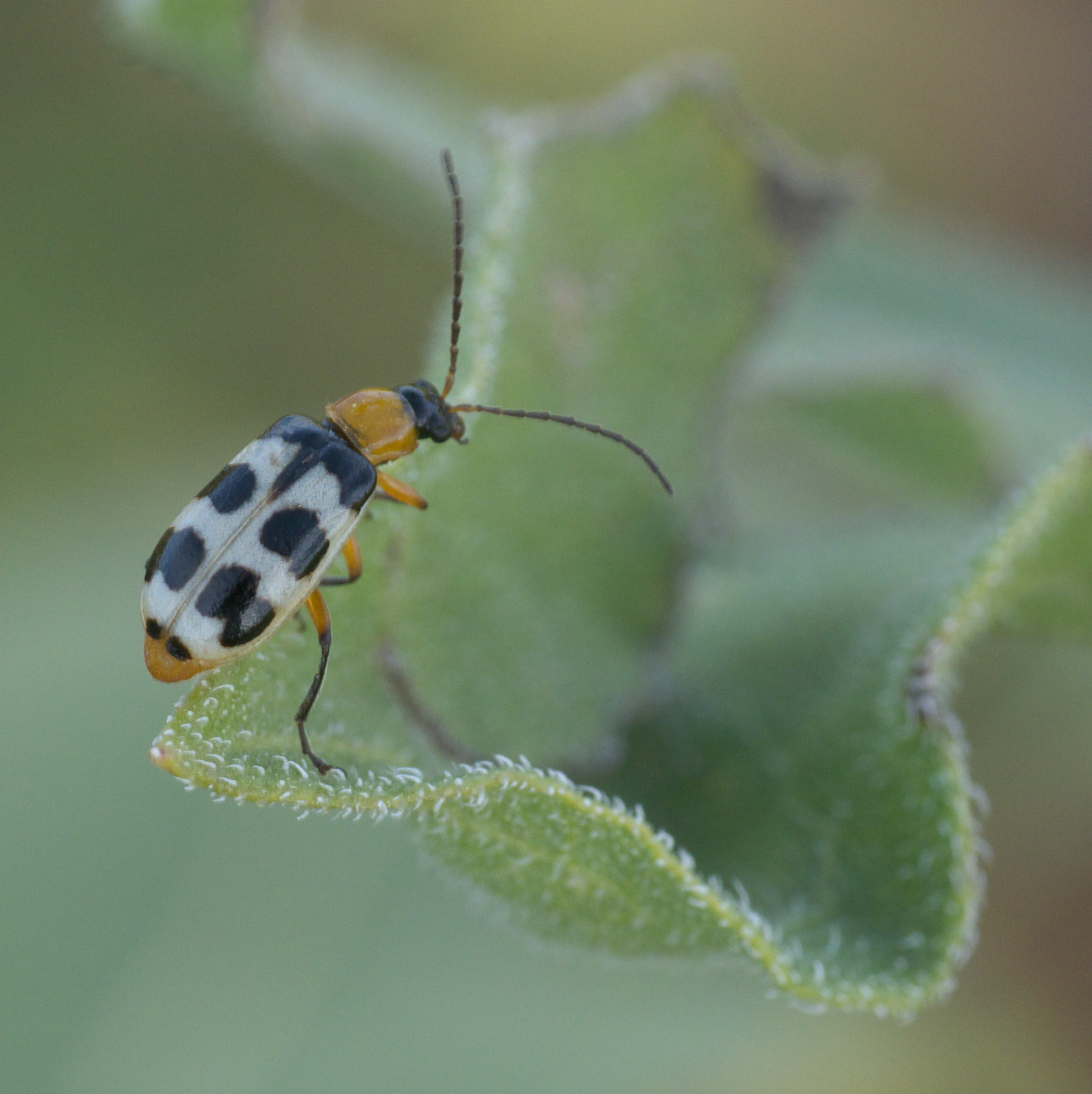
Checkered melon beetle, Paranapiacaba tricincta
