= Paranapiacaba connexa =

Scientific classification
- Kingdom: Animalia
- Phylum: Arthropoda
- Clade: Pancrustacea
- Class: Insecta
- Order: Coleoptera
- Suborder: Polyphaga
- Infraorder: Cucujiformia
- Family: Chrysomelidae
- Subfamily: Galerucinae
- Tribe: Luperini
- Genus: Paranapiacaba
- Species: P. connexa

Binomial name
- Paranapiacaba connexa (J. L. LeConte, 1865)

Species of beetle

Paranapiacaba connexa is a species of skeletonizing leaf beetle in the family Chrysomelidae. It is found in Central America and North America.
