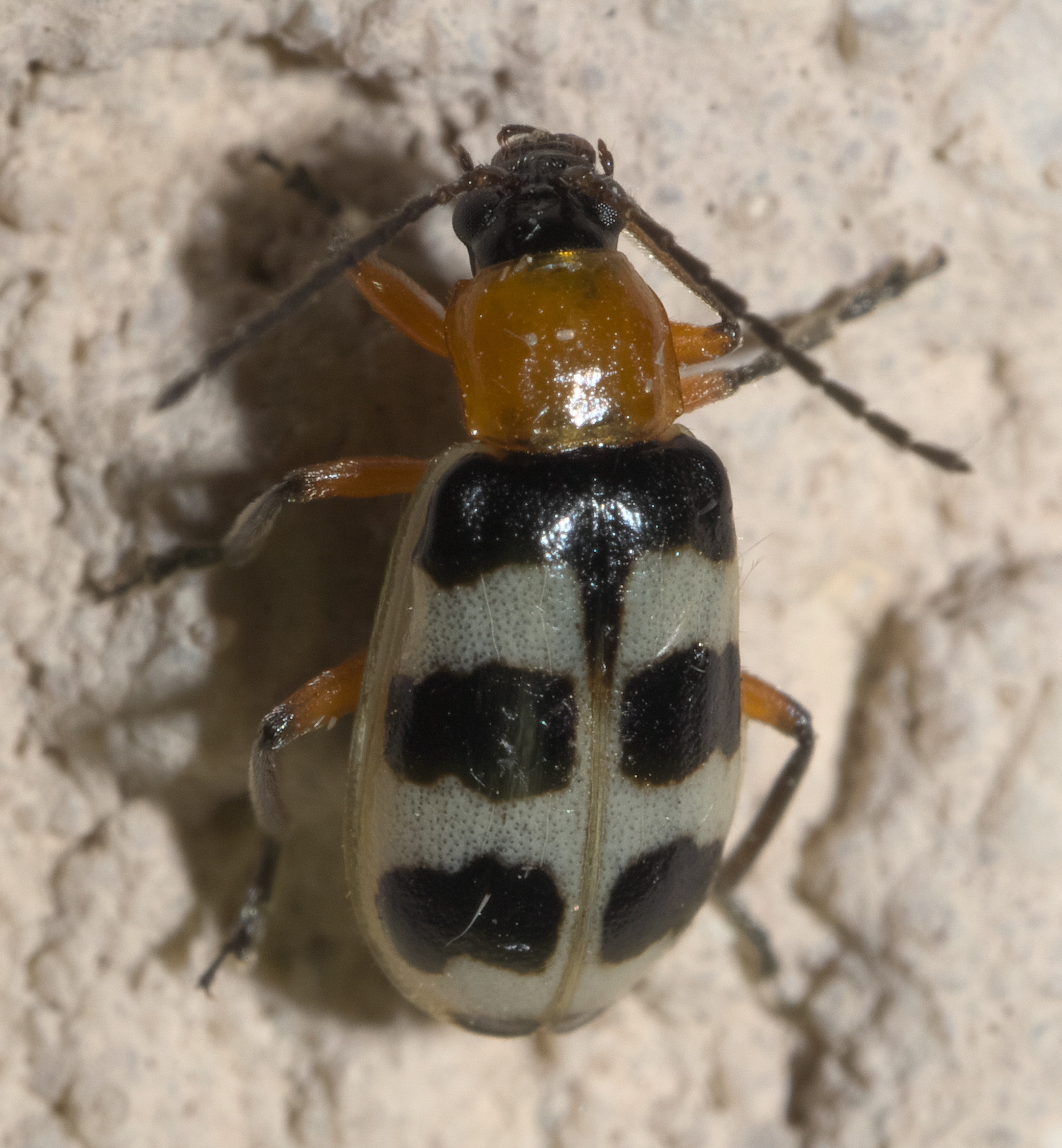
- Paranapiacaba tricincta

Scientific classification
- Kingdom: Animalia
- Phylum: Arthropoda
- Clade: Pancrustacea
- Class: Insecta
- Order: Coleoptera
- Suborder: Polyphaga
- Infraorder: Cucujiformia
- Family: Chrysomelidae
- Tribe: Luperini
- Genus: Paranapiacaba; J. Bechyné, 1958

= Paranapiacaba (beetle) =

Genus of beetles

Paranapiacaba is a genus of skeletonizing leaf beetles and flea beetles in the family Chrysomelidae. There are at least two described species in Paranapiacaba.

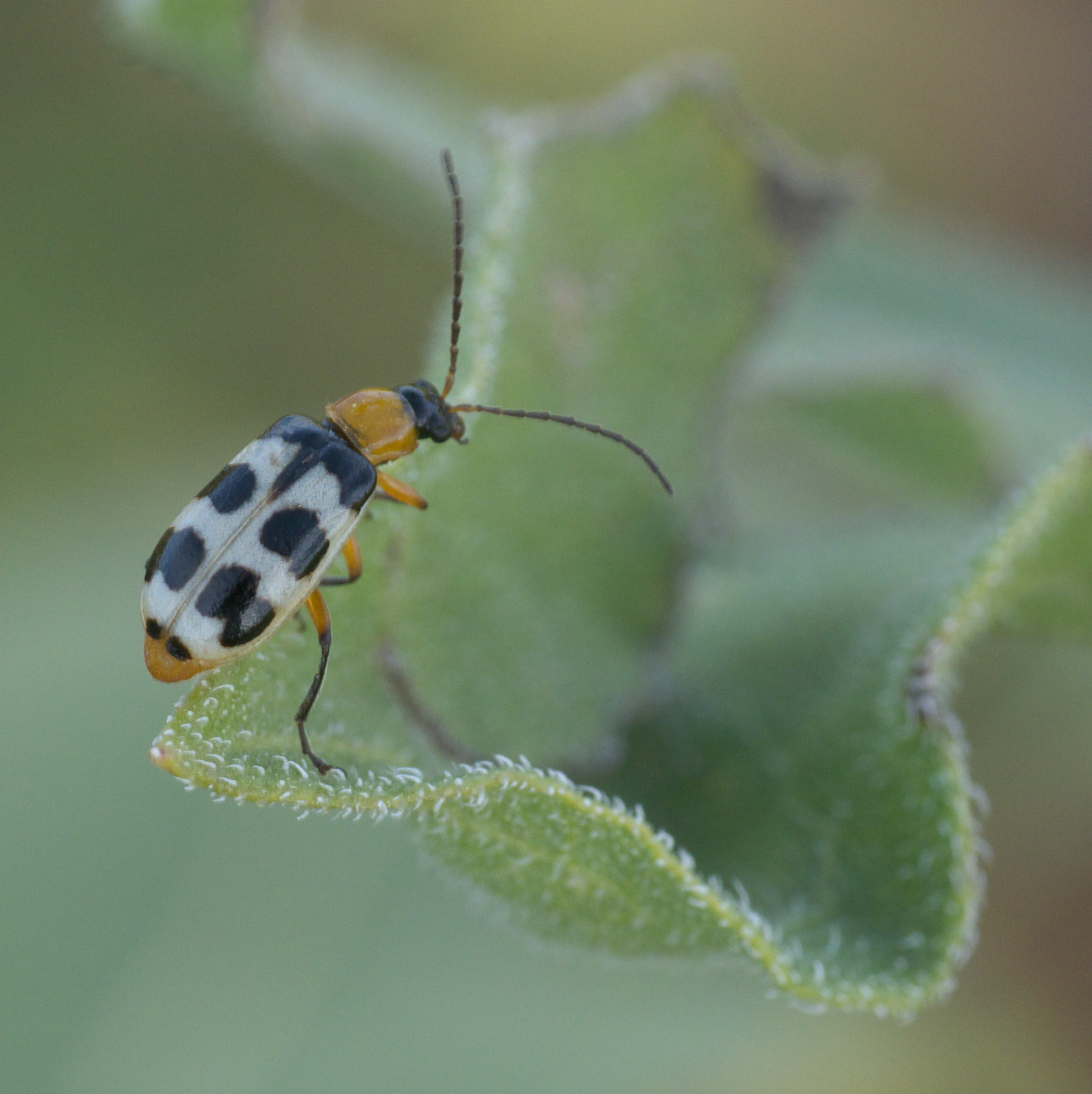
Paranapiacaba tricincta

== Species ==
These two species belong to the genus Paranapiacaba:

== Soorten ==
- Paranapiacaba admirationis (Olivier, 1808)
- Paranapiacaba allomorpha (Bechyne, 1956)
- Paranapiacaba amplexa (Erichson, 1847)
- Paranapiacaba angustofasciata (Bowditch, 1911)
- Paranapiacaba aragua Bechyne, 1997
- Paranapiacaba bicolor (Jacoby, 1886)
- Paranapiacaba biseriata (Gahan, 1891)
- Paranapiacaba bistrigata (Gahan, 1891)
- Paranapiacaba chevrolati (Harold, 1875)
- Paranapiacaba connexa (Leconte, 1865)
- Paranapiacaba costalimai (Marques, 1941)
- Paranapiacaba decemverrucata (Gahan, 1891)
- Paranapiacaba diametralis (Bechyne, 1956)
- Paranapiacaba dorsoplagiata Jacoby, 1967
- Paranapiacaba duodecemmaculata (Klug, 1829)
- Paranapiacaba farri (Blake, 1965)
- Paranapiacaba fasciatipennis Gahan, 1891
- Paranapiacaba femorata (Jacoby, 1887)
- Paranapiacaba funesta (Jacoby, 1887)
- Paranapiacaba fuscomarginata (Jacoby, 1878)
- Paranapiacaba galera (Bechyne, 1956)
- Paranapiacaba guyanensis (Bowditch, 1912)
- Paranapiacaba hispaniolae (Blake, 1963)
- Paranapiacaba humeralis (Gahan, 1891)
- Paranapiacaba illa (Bechyne, 1958)
- Paranapiacaba inclusa (Jacoby, 1887)
- Paranapiacaba interruptolineata (Baly, 1889)
- Paranapiacaba irregularis (Jacoby, 1887)
- Paranapiacaba javelia (Bechyne, 1956)
- Paranapiacaba lateritia (Jacoby, 1887)
- Paranapiacaba maculatipennis (Baly, 1891)
- Paranapiacaba marginicollis (Gahan, 1891)
- Paranapiacaba marginipennis (Bowditch, 1925)
- Paranapiacaba melanospila (Gahan, 1891)
- Paranapiacaba metastigma (Bechyne, 1956)
- Paranapiacaba morretesi (Bechyne & Bechyne, 1969)
- Paranapiacaba nigrina (Jacoby, 1887)
- Paranapiacaba ohausi (Bechyne & Bechyne, 1962)
- Paranapiacaba paranacita (Bechyne, 1956)
- Paranapiacaba pereirai Bechyne, 1958
- Paranapiacaba piceicollis (Baly, 1886)
- Paranapiacaba prolongata (Jacoby, 1882)
- Paranapiacaba reichei (Gahan, 1891)
- Paranapiacaba reitteri (Baly, 1890)
- Paranapiacaba requenai Bechyne, 1997
- Paranapiacaba romani (Weise, 1921)
- Paranapiacaba rufofasciata (Jacoby, 1887)
- Paranapiacaba seraphina (Bechyne, 1956)
- Paranapiacaba significata (Gahan, 1891)
- Paranapiacaba spectanda (Baly, 1886)
- Paranapiacaba subirregularis (Bechyne & Bechyne, 1962)
- Paranapiacaba subsignata (Jacoby, 1887)
- Paranapiacaba teinturieri (Allard, 1894)
- Paranapiacaba tricincta (Say, 1824) (checkered melon beetle)
- Paranapiacaba unicincta (Bowditch, 1911)
- Paranapiacaba v-nigrum (Jacoby, 1887)
- Paranapiacaba volxemi (Baly, 1889)
- Paranapiacaba waterhousei (Jacoby, 1878)
