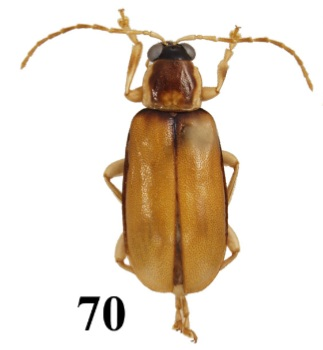

Scientific classification
- Kingdom: Animalia
- Phylum: Arthropoda
- Clade: Pancrustacea
- Class: Insecta
- Order: Coleoptera
- Suborder: Polyphaga
- Infraorder: Cucujiformia
- Family: Chrysomelidae
- Genus: Paranapiacaba
- Species: P. fuscomarginata

Binomial name
- Paranapiacaba fuscomarginata (Jacoby, 1878)

Synonyms
- Diabrotica fuscomarginata Jacoby, 1878

= Paranapiacaba fuscomarginata =

Species of beetle

Paranapiacaba fuscomarginata is a species of beetle of the family Chrysomelidae. It is found in Panama.
