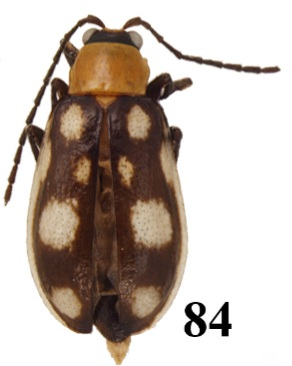

Scientific classification
- Kingdom: Animalia
- Phylum: Arthropoda
- Clade: Pancrustacea
- Class: Insecta
- Order: Coleoptera
- Suborder: Polyphaga
- Infraorder: Cucujiformia
- Family: Chrysomelidae
- Genus: Isotes
- Species: I. delicula

Binomial name
- Isotes delicula (Erichson, 1847)

Synonyms
- Diabrotica delicula Erichson, 1847

= Isotes delicula =

Species of beetle

Isotes delicula is a species of beetle of the family Chrysomelidae. It is found in Peru and Bolivia.
