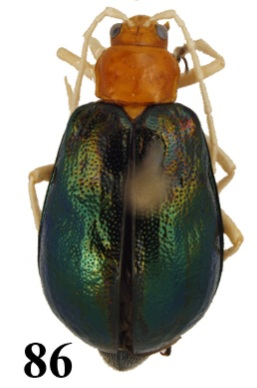

Scientific classification
- Kingdom: Animalia
- Phylum: Arthropoda
- Clade: Pancrustacea
- Class: Insecta
- Order: Coleoptera
- Suborder: Polyphaga
- Infraorder: Cucujiformia
- Family: Chrysomelidae
- Genus: Isotes
- Species: I. gemmula

Binomial name
- Isotes gemmula (Jacoby, 1887)

Synonyms
- Diabrotica gemmula Jacoby, 1887

= Isotes gemmula =

Species of beetle

Isotes gemmula is a species of beetle of the family Chrysomelidae. It is found in Costa Rica.
