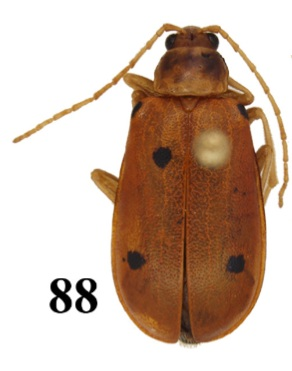

Scientific classification
- Kingdom: Animalia
- Phylum: Arthropoda
- Clade: Pancrustacea
- Class: Insecta
- Order: Coleoptera
- Suborder: Polyphaga
- Infraorder: Cucujiformia
- Family: Chrysomelidae
- Genus: Isotes
- Species: I. sexpunctata

Binomial name
- Isotes sexpunctata (Jacoby, 1878)

Synonyms
- Diabrotica sexpunctata Jacoby, 1878

= Isotes sexpunctata =

Species of beetle

Isotes sexpunctata is a species of beetle of the family Chrysomelidae. It is found in Chile.
