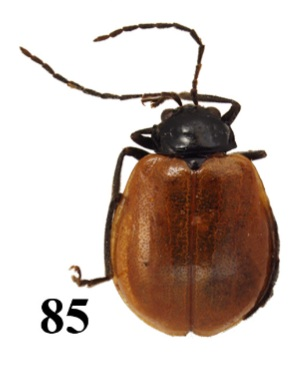

Scientific classification
- Kingdom: Animalia
- Phylum: Arthropoda
- Clade: Pancrustacea
- Class: Insecta
- Order: Coleoptera
- Suborder: Polyphaga
- Infraorder: Cucujiformia
- Family: Chrysomelidae
- Genus: Isotes
- Species: I. dilatata

Binomial name
- Isotes dilatata (Jacoby, 1887)

Synonyms
- Diabrotica dilatata Jacoby, 1887

= Isotes dilatata =

Species of beetle

Isotes dilatata is a species of beetle of the family Chrysomelidae. It is found in Mexico (Sonora, Veracruz, Chiapas), Guatemala, Nicaragua, Costa Rica and Panama.
