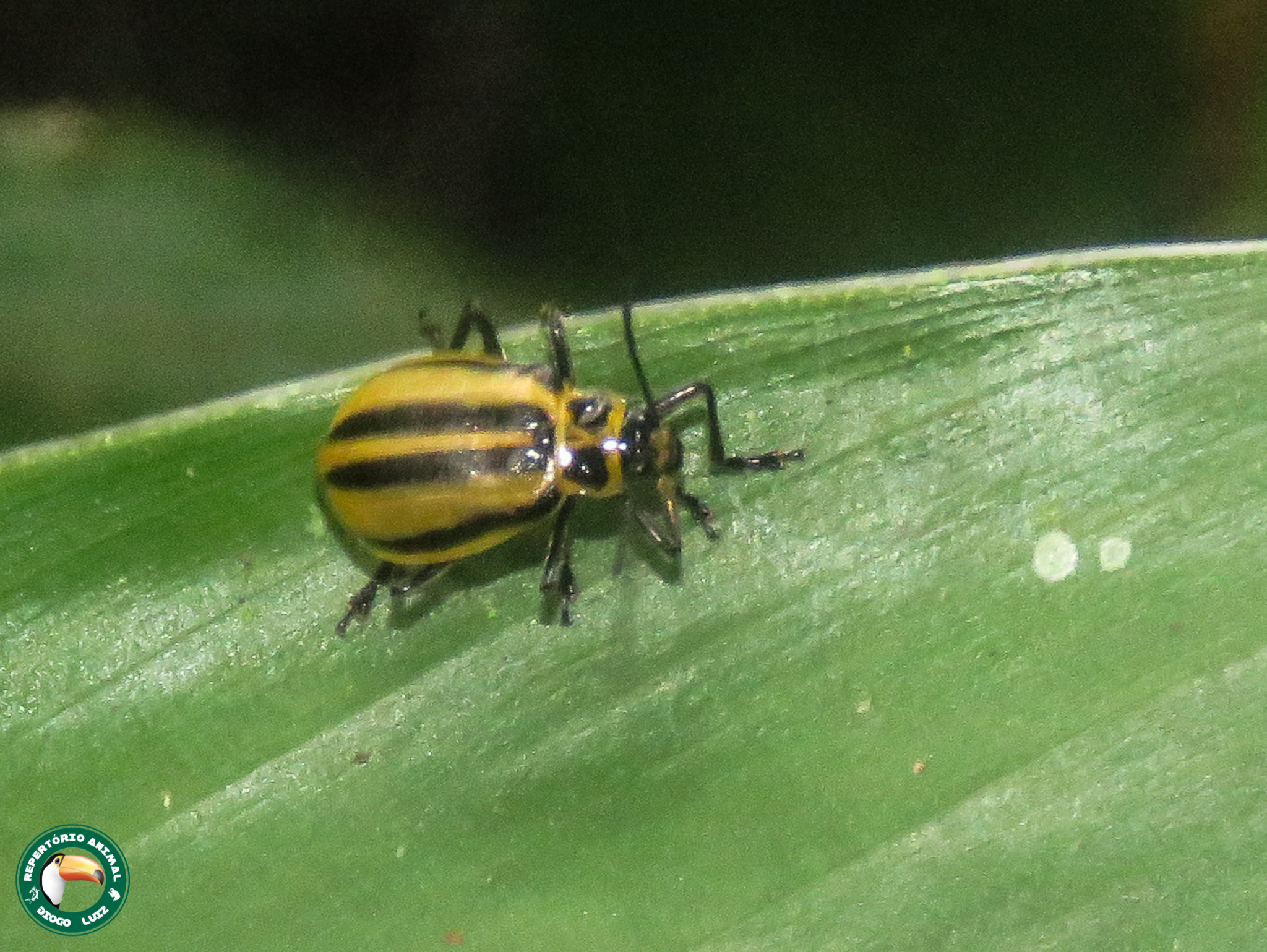
- Isotes spilothorax, Brazil

Scientific classification
- Kingdom: Animalia
- Phylum: Arthropoda
- Clade: Pancrustacea
- Class: Insecta
- Order: Coleoptera
- Suborder: Polyphaga
- Infraorder: Cucujiformia
- Family: Chrysomelidae
- Subfamily: Galerucinae
- Tribe: Luperini
- Subtribe: Diabroticina
- Genus: Isotes; Weise, 1922

Synonyms
- Synbrotica Bechyné, 1956

= Isotes =

Genus of leaf beetles

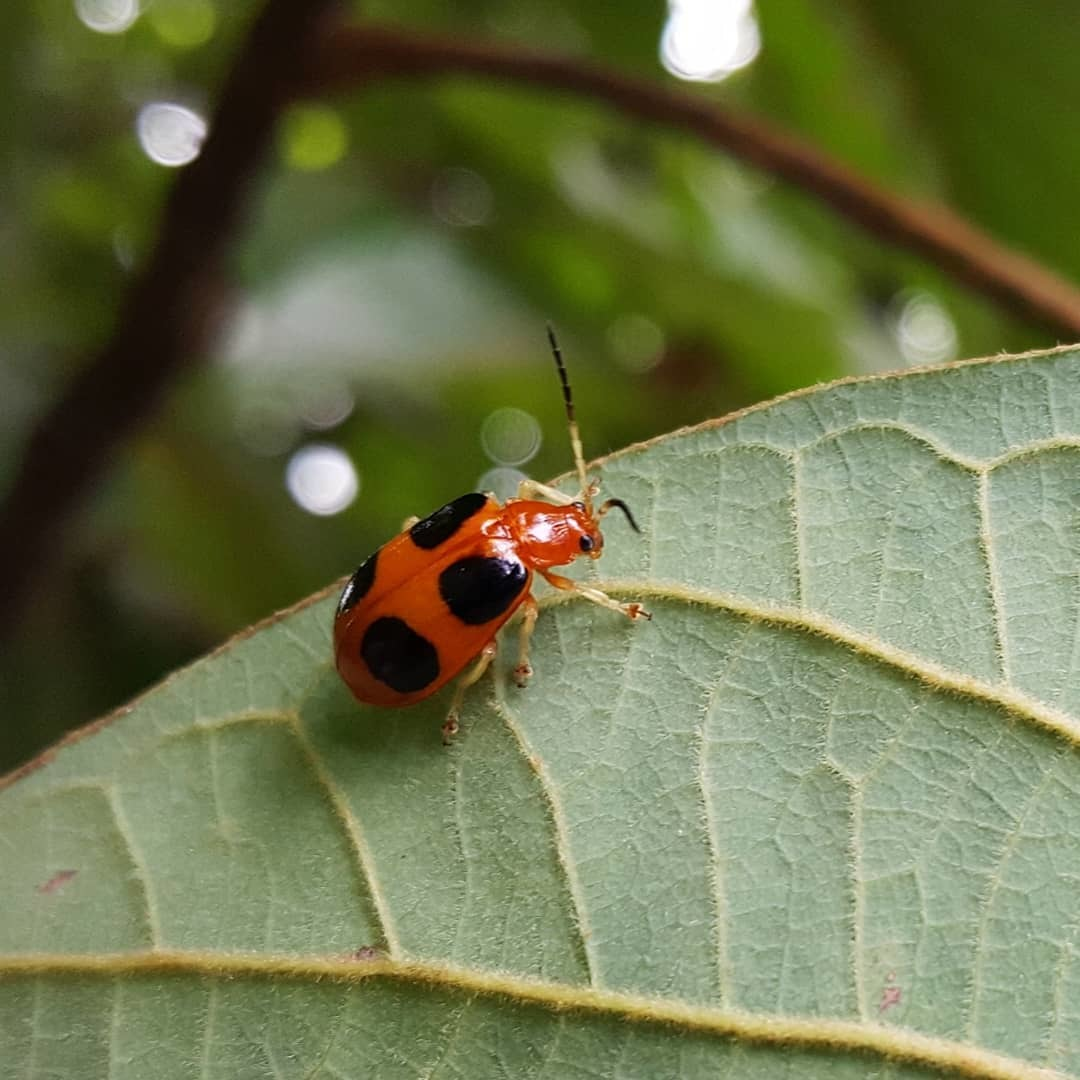
Isotes tetraspilota, Mexico

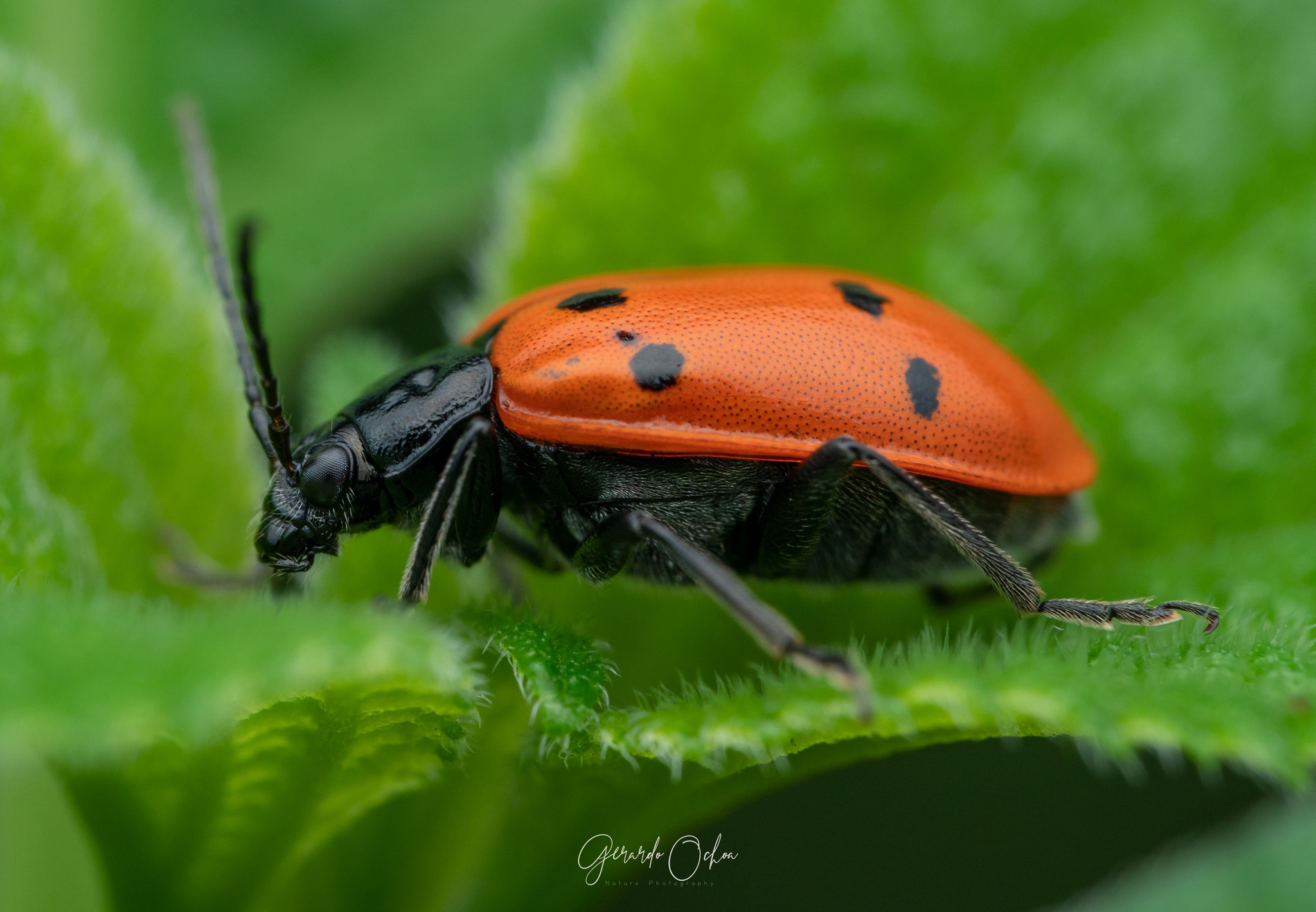
Isotes octosignata, Mexico

Isotes is a genus of skeletonizing leaf beetles in the family Chrysomelidae. There are currently about 180 described species in Isotes. They are found in the Neotropics.

== Species ==
These 59 species are among those that belong to the genus Isotes:

- Isotes agatha (Bechyné & Bechyné, 1969)
- Isotes albidocincta (Baly, 1889)
- Isotes alcyone (Baly, 1889)
- Isotes antonia (Bechyné, 1956)
- Isotes atriventris (Jacoby, 1880)
- Isotes bertonii (Bowditch, 1912)
- Isotes bicincta (Bowdtich, 1912)
- Isotes blattoides (Jacoby, 1892)
- Isotes borrei (Baly, 1889)
- Isotes brasiliensis (Jacoby, 1888)
- Isotes bruchii
- Isotes cargona (Bechyné, 1958)
- Isotes caryocara (Bechyné, 1956)
- Isotes cinctella (Chevrolat, 1884)
- Isotes complicata (Jacoby, 1887)
- Isotes corallina (Jacoby, 1887)
- Isotes cribrata (Gahan, 1891)
- Isotes crucigera (Weise, 1916)
- Isotes delicula (Erichson, 1847)
- Isotes depressa (Jacoby, 1887)
- Isotes digna (Gahan, 1891)
- Isotes dilatata (Jacoby, 1887)
- Isotes distinguenda (Jacoby, 1887)
- Isotes donata (Bechyné, 1956)
- Isotes eruptiva (Bechyné, 1955)
- Isotes figurata (Jacoby, 1887)
- Isotes gemmula (Jacoby, 1887)
- Isotes ignatia (Bechyné, 1956)
- Isotes imbuta (Erichson, 1847)
- Isotes interruptofasciata (Baly 1879)
- Isotes laevicollis (Jacoby, 1887)
- Isotes lineatopunctata (Jacoby, 1887)
- Isotes marginella (Jacoby, 1879)
- Isotes mexicana (Harold, 1875)
- Isotes multipunctata (Jacoby, 1878)
- Isotes nitidula (Jacoby, 1887)
- Isotes obscuromaculata
- Isotes octosignata (Baly, 1879)
- Isotes onira (Bechyné & Bechyné, 1961)
- Isotes opacicollis
- Isotes pollina (Bechyné & Bechyné, 1962)
- Isotes puella (Baly, 1886)
- Isotes quatuordecimpunctata (Jacoby 1892)
- Isotes rubripennis (Erichson, 1847)
- Isotes sanguineipennis (Baly, 1891)
- Isotes saundersi
- Isotes semiflava (Germar, 1824)
- Isotes semiopaca (Jacoby, 1892)
- Isotes septempunctata (Jacoby, 1887)
- Isotes sexpunctata (Jacoby 1878)
- Isotes sibylla (Bechyné & Bechyné, 1969)
- Isotes spilothorax (Harold, 1875)
- Isotes taeniolata (Gahan, 1891)
- Isotes ternata (Bechyné & Bechyné, 1961)
- Isotes tetraspilota (Baly, 1865)
- Isotes uniformis (Jacoby, 1887)
- Isotes valentina (Bechyné, 1956)
- Isotes varipes (Boheman, 1859)
- Isotes vittula (Bowditch, 1911)
