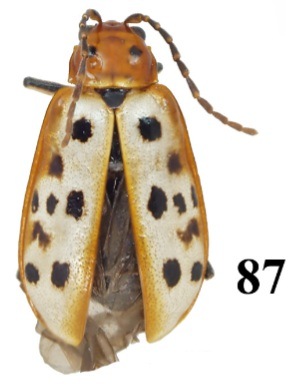

Scientific classification
- Kingdom: Animalia
- Phylum: Arthropoda
- Clade: Pancrustacea
- Class: Insecta
- Order: Coleoptera
- Suborder: Polyphaga
- Infraorder: Cucujiformia
- Family: Chrysomelidae
- Genus: Isotes
- Species: I. multipunctata

Binomial name
- Isotes multipunctata (Jacoby, 1878)

Synonyms
- Diabrotica multipunctata Jacoby, 1878

= Isotes multipunctata =

Species of beetle

Isotes multipunctata is a species of beetle of the family Chrysomelidae. It is found in Mexico (Guanajuato, Querétaro, Hidalgo, Michoacán, Mexico, Puebla, Oaxaca).
