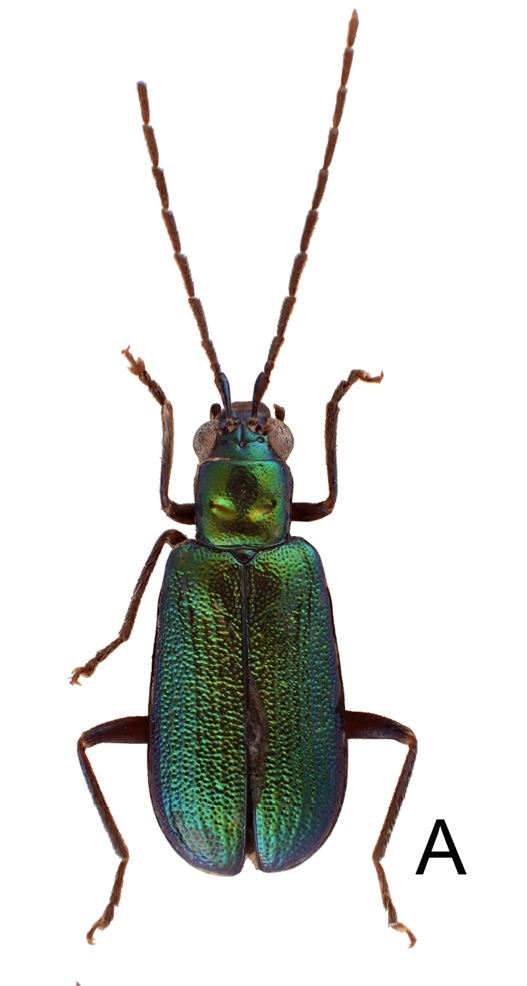
- Borneotheopea jakli

Scientific classification
- Kingdom: Animalia
- Phylum: Arthropoda
- Clade: Pancrustacea
- Class: Insecta
- Order: Coleoptera
- Suborder: Polyphaga
- Infraorder: Cucujiformia
- Family: Chrysomelidae
- Subfamily: Galerucinae
- Tribe: Luperini
- Subtribe: Luperina
- Genus: Borneotheopea; Lee & Bezdek, 2020

Type species
- Borneotheopea jakli Lee & Bezděk, 2020

= Borneotheopea =

Genus of leaf beetles

Borneotheopea is a genus of leaf beetles in the family Chrysomelidae. There are at least two described species in Borneotheopea, both found in Borneo. It is closely related to the genus Theopea.

== Species ==
These two species belong to the genus Borneotheopea:

- Borneotheopea jakli Lee & Bezděk, 2020
- Borneotheopea kalimantanensis Lee & Bezděk, 2020
