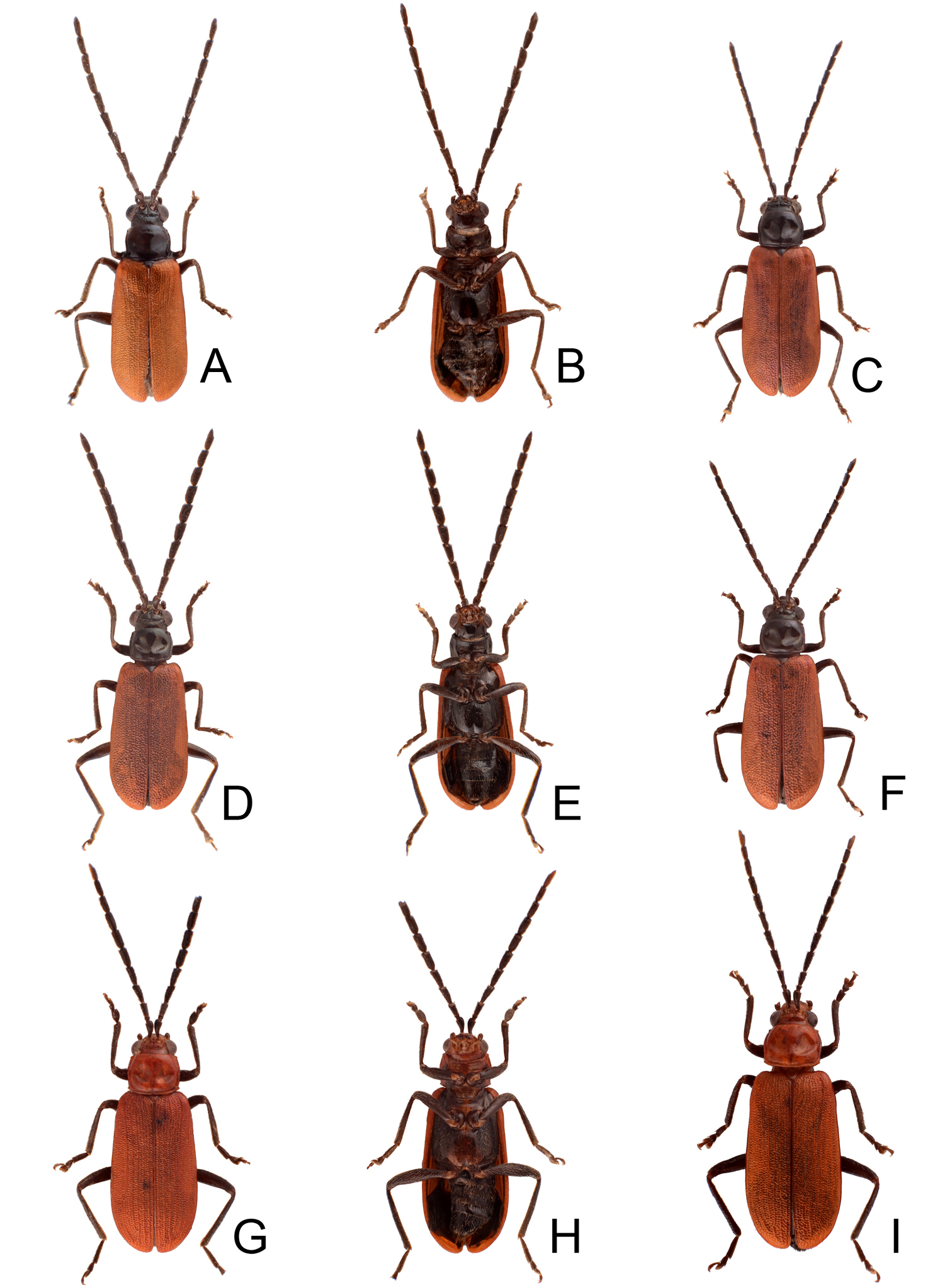
- Theopea bicolor (first row), Theopea bicolorides (second row), and Theopea mouhoti (third row)

Scientific classification
- Kingdom: Animalia
- Phylum: Arthropoda
- Clade: Pancrustacea
- Class: Insecta
- Order: Coleoptera
- Suborder: Polyphaga
- Infraorder: Cucujiformia
- Family: Chrysomelidae
- Subfamily: Galerucinae
- Tribe: Luperini
- Subtribe: Luperina
- Genus: Theopea; Baly, 1864

Type species
- Crioceris impressa Fabricius, 1801

= Theopea =

Genus of leaf beetles

Theopea is a genus of skeletonizing leaf beetles in the family Chrysomelidae. There are more than 25 described species in Theopea. They are found in Indomalaya and the Palearctic. It is closely related to the genera Pseudotheopea and Borneotheopea.

== Species ==
These 28 species belong to the genus Theopea, divided into three species groups (with nine others considered as species incertae sedis):

Theopea impressa group:

- Theopea chungi Lee & Bezdĕk, 2019
- Theopea impressa (Fabricius, 1801)
- Theopea longicollis (Jacoby, 1896)
- Theopea louwerensi Jolivet, 1951
- Theopea lunduensis Mohamedsaid, 1998

Theopea flavipalpis group:

- Theopea flavipalpis Laboissiere, 1940
- Theopea guoi Lee & Bezdĕk, 2019
- Theopea lui Lee & Bezdĕk, 2019
- Theopea sabahensis Lee & Bezdĕk, 2019

Theopea pulchella group:

- Theopea bicolor Kimoto, 1989
- Theopea bicoloroides Lee & Bezděk, 2020
- Theopea elegantula Baly, 1864
- Theopea fairmairei Duvivier, 1885
- Theopea houjayi Lee & Bezdĕk, 2019
- Theopea kedenburgi Weise, 1922
- Theopea mouhoti Baly, 1864
- Theopea pulchella Baly, 1864
- Theopea tsoui Lee & Bezdĕk, 2019
- Theopea yuae Lee & Bezdĕk, 2019

Species incertae sedis:

- Theopea clypeata Jacoby, 1896
- Theopea dohrni (Jacoby, 1889)
- Theopea incostata (Allard, 1889)
- Theopea intermedia (Jacoby, 1889)
- Theopea modiglianii Jacoby, 1896
- Theopea obliterata Jacoby, 1884
- Theopea variabilis (Jacoby, 1887)
- Theopea viridipennis (Jacoby, 1899)
- Theopea weberi (Weise, 1913)
