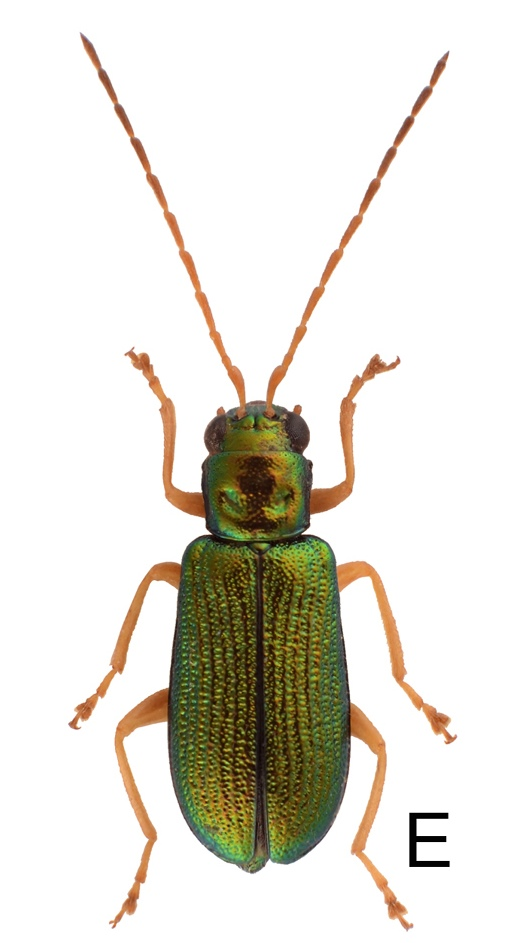
- Pseudotheopea smaragdina

Scientific classification
- Kingdom: Animalia
- Phylum: Arthropoda
- Clade: Pancrustacea
- Class: Insecta
- Order: Coleoptera
- Suborder: Polyphaga
- Infraorder: Cucujiformia
- Family: Chrysomelidae
- Subfamily: Galerucinae
- Tribe: Luperini
- Subtribe: Luperina
- Genus: Pseudotheopea; Lee & Bezdek, 2020

Type species
- Theopea sauteri Chûjô, 1935

= Pseudotheopea =

Genus of leaf beetles

Pseudotheopea is a genus of skeletonizing leaf beetles in the family Chrysomelidae. There are more than 20 described species in Pseudotheopea, found in Indomalaya and the Palearctic. It is closely related to the genus Theopea.

== Species ==
These 24 species belong to the genus Pseudotheopea, divided into three species groups (with five other species currently unassigned to any group):

Pseudotheopea sauteri group:

Pseudotheopea coerulea (Gressitt & Kimoto, 1963) (China)
Pseudotheopea geiseri (Lee & Bezděk, 2018) (India)
Pseudotheopea hainanensis (Lee & Bezděk, 2018) (China)
Pseudotheopea laosensis (Lee & Bezděk, 2018) (China, Laos, Vietnam)
Pseudotheopea sauteri (Chûjô, 1935) (Taiwan)
Pseudotheopea sekerkai (Lee & Bezděk, 2018) (Laos)

Pseudotheopea costata group:

Pseudotheopea aeneipennis (Gressitt & Kimoto, 1963) (China)
Pseudotheopea azurea (Gressitt & Kimoto, 1963) (China)
Pseudotheopea boreri Lee & Bezděk, 2020 (India)
Pseudotheopea clypealis (Medvedev, 2015) (Vietnam)
Pseudotheopea costata (Allard, 1889) (Philippines)
Pseudotheopea gressitti Lee and Bezděk, 2020 (Philippines)
Pseudotheopea hsingtzungi Lee & Bezděk, 2020 (Laos)
Pseudotheopea kimotoi Lee & Bezděk, 2020 (Laos, Thailand, Vietnam)
Pseudotheopea leehsuehae Lee & Bezděk, 2020 (Laos)
Pseudotheopea smaragdina (Gressitt & Kimoto, 1963) (China)
Pseudotheopea sufangae Lee & Bezděk, 2020 (Taiwan)

Pseudotheopea similis group:

Pseudotheopea nigrita (Medvedev, 2007) (Thailand)
Pseudotheopea similis (Kimoto, 1989) (Laos, Vietnam)

Species unassigned to any species group:

Pseudotheopea aureoviridis (Chûjô, 1935) (Japan)
Pseudotheopea cheni (Lee & Bezděk, 2018) (Taiwan)
Pseudotheopea collaris (Kimoto, 1989) (Taiwan)
Pseudotheopea irregularis (Takizawa, 1978) (Taiwan)
Pseudotheopea kanmiyai (Kimoto, 1984) (Taiwan)
