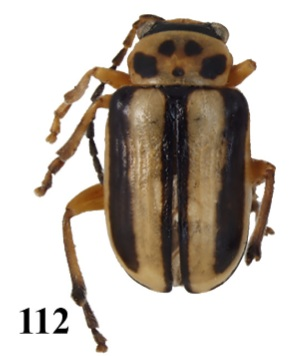

Scientific classification
- Kingdom: Animalia
- Phylum: Arthropoda
- Clade: Pancrustacea
- Class: Insecta
- Order: Coleoptera
- Suborder: Polyphaga
- Infraorder: Cucujiformia
- Family: Chrysomelidae
- Genus: Carpiradialis
- Species: C. pueblensis

Binomial name
- Carpiradialis pueblensis Niño-Maldonado & Clark, 2020

= Carpiradialis pueblensis =

Species of beetle

Carpiradialis pueblensis is a species of beetle of the family Chrysomelidae. It is found in Mexico (Puebla).
