= Carpiradialis =

Scientific classification
- Kingdom: Animalia
- Phylum: Arthropoda
- Clade: Pancrustacea
- Class: Insecta
- Order: Coleoptera
- Suborder: Polyphaga
- Infraorder: Cucujiformia
- Family: Chrysomelidae
- Tribe: Luperini
- Subtribe: Luperina
- Genus: Carpiradialis; Niño-Maldonado & Clark, 2020

Genus of leaf beetles

Carpiradialis is a genus of beetles belonging to the family Chrysomelidae.

== Species ==
- Carpiradialis pueblensis Niño-Maldonado & Clark, 2020
- Carpiradialis tamaulipensis Niño-Maldonado & Clark, 2020
